= Techi Dam =

Dam in Heping, Taichung, Taiwan

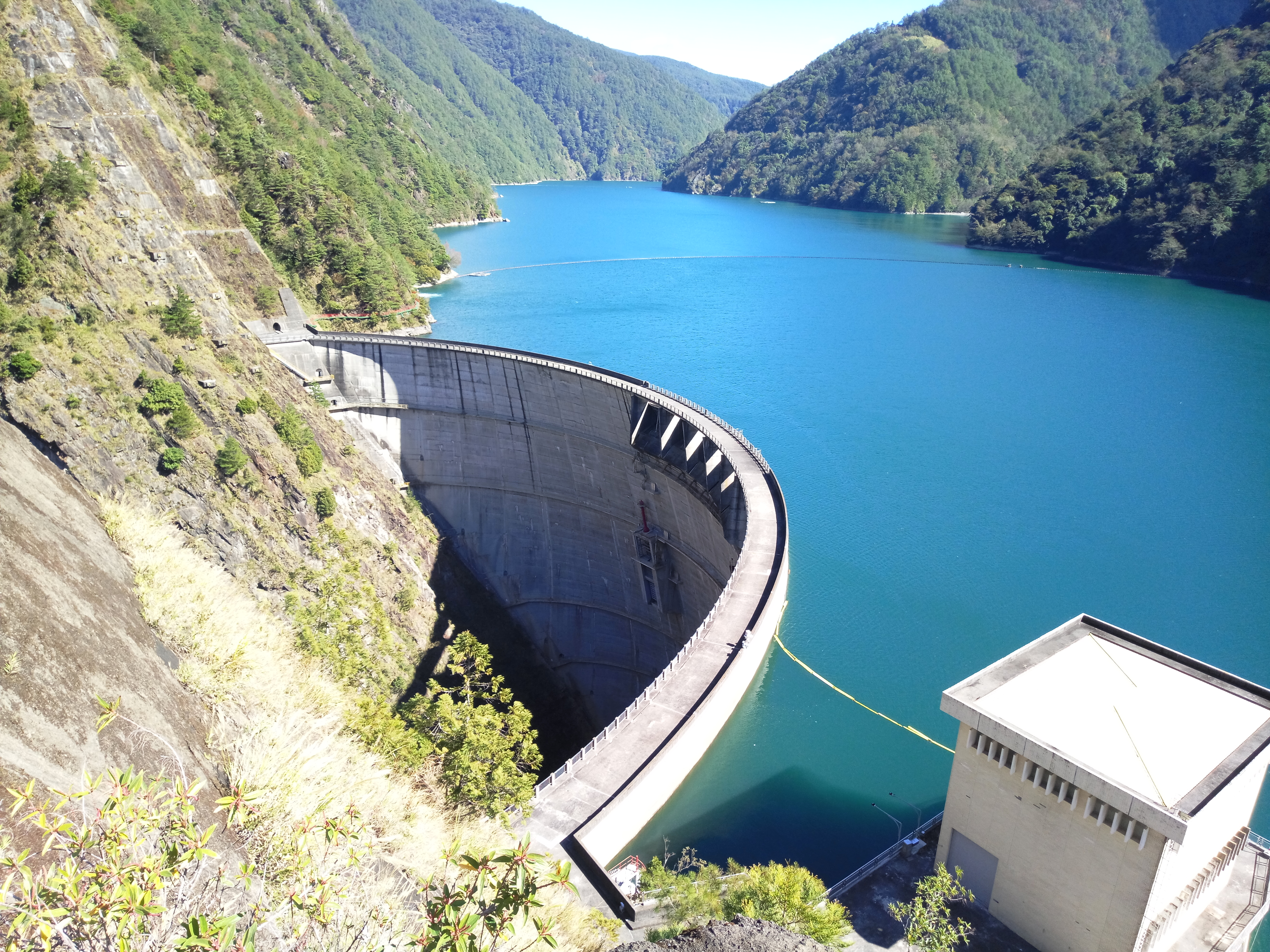

- Location of Techi Dam in Taiwan
- Official name: 德基水壩
- Location: Heping, Taichung, Taiwan
- Coordinates: 24°15′19″N 121°10′03″E
- Construction began: 1969; 57 years ago
- Opening date: 1974; 52 years ago
- Owner: Taiwan Power Company

Dam and spillways
- Type of dam: Concrete thin arch
- Impounds: Dajia River
- Height: 180 m (590 ft)
- Length: 290 m (950 ft)
- Elevation at crest: 1,411 m (4,629 ft)

Reservoir
- Creates: Techi Reservoir
- Total capacity: 218,150 dam^{3} (176,860 acre⋅ft)
- Catchment area: 514 km^{2} (198 mi^{2})
- Surface area: 454 ha (1,120 acres)

Power Station
- Turbines: 3x 78 MW
- Installed capacity: 234 MW
- Annual generation: 359,000,000 kWh

Techi Dam (Chinese: 德基水壩; pinyin: Déjī Shuǐbà; Pe̍h-ōe-jī: Tek-ki Chúi-pà) is a concrete thin arch dam on the Dajia River in Heping District, Taichung, Taiwan. Forming the 454 ha (1,120-acre) Techi Reservoir (德基水庫), the dam is built in the Tachien Gorge in Heping District, providing hydroelectric power, irrigation water, and some flood control, and is operated by the Taiwan Power Company. At 180 m (590 ft), it is the highest dam in Taiwan and one of the tallest dams in the world. The dam was completed in 1974 after five years of construction.

== History ==
Proposals to dam the Dajia River date back to the period of Japanese colonial rule in Taiwan (1895–1945), when dams were envisioned to generate 430 megawatts (MW) of power on the river. In 1936, the Taiwan Power Company began to survey and collect data at this site, but there would be a gap of more than ten years between Taiwan's 1945 independence from Japan and the beginning of development on the Dajia River. The downstream Tienlun and Kukuan dams were built in 1956 and 1961 respectively, but with their small storage capacities, power output was highly erratic. A high dam upstream would be required to control the flow through these downstream power stations. The exceptionally narrow Tachien Gorge, located approximately 10 km (6.2 mi) upstream from Kukuan, was regarded as an excellent dam site; an engineer surveying this location remarked, "When God created Tachien, he must have had a dam in mind."

The proposed Tachien Dam site was located at the end of a long valley where the surrounding mountains abruptly closed in to form a narrow slot canyon through which flowed the Dajia River. Here, engineers planned to build a dam 237 m (778 ft) high and 319 m (1,047 ft) long, supported by a large saddle dam to the west, impounding a reservoir of 554 million cubic metres (449,000 acre⋅ft), forming, the second-highest arch dam in the world at the time (after Italy's Vajont Dam) and the largest artificial lake in Taiwan. The dam would support a 360 MW power station and generate over 736 million kWh per year. Of the dam's projected US$110 million cost, the United States provided a loan of about US$40 million, while Japan would provide assistance with hydraulic gates and power-generating equipment.

Construction at Tachien Dam began in December 1969, with work directed and overseen by French civil engineers André Coyne and Jean Bellier. Due to the remote site, economic conditions and technical issues, it was a very difficult project for Taiwan at the time, but public support made continued construction possible. The planned height of the dam was scaled down about 25 percent from the original design to 180 m (590 ft), reducing the planned reservoir and power generation capacities as well. The reservoir began filling in June 1974, and the dam structure was completed in September 1974. At the dedication ceremony, Chiang Kai-shek officially named the dam "Techi", meaning "foundation of virtue". In 1975, the Republic of China issued a set of postage stamps to commemorate the completion of the project.

== Specifications ==
Techi Dam is located at the head of a 514 km^{2} (198 mi^{2}) watershed in the upper reaches of the Dajia River. The catchment area is extremely rugged and mountainous, with elevations ranging from 1,400 m (4,600 ft) at the dam to well over 3,200 m (10,500 ft) at the crest of the mountains. This rugged topography makes the catchment extremely susceptible to floods and earthflows. Techi Dam greatly reduces the impact of these events along the lower Dajia River.

As built, the dam is a concrete variable-radius thin arch structure 180 m (590 ft) high and 290 m (950 ft) long, 4.5 m (15 ft) wide at the crest and 20 m (66 ft) wide at the base. The dam impounds a reservoir with a surface area of 454 ha (1,120 acres) and a useful storage capacity of 218,150 dam^{3} (176,860 acre⋅ft). In addition to the natural water flow into the reservoir, water is diverted through a 1,305 m (4,281 ft) long, 66.5 m^{3}/s (2,350 cu ft/s) capacity tunnel from the Zhile River, a tributary of the Dajia River that joins below the dam. This increases the effective catchment area by 78 km^{2} (30 mi^{2}) to a total of 592 km^{2} (229 mi^{2}). Outflows from the dam are controlled by three spillways. The crest spillway consists of five 11 m × 5.8 m (36 ft × 19 ft) gates with a total capacity of 1,400 m^{3}/s (49,441 cu ft/s). There are also two orifice floodgates located on the face of the dam 61 m (200 ft) below the crest with a combined capacity of 1,600 m^{3}/s (56,503 cu ft/s). The auxiliary spillway is located on the reservoir about 300 m (980 ft) southwest of the dam, and consists of a tunnel controlled by five gates with a capacity of 3,400 m^{3}/s (120,070 cu ft/s). With all outlets open, the dam is capable of releasing 6,400 m^{3}/s (226,014 cu ft/s).

The dam supplies water to an underground power station capable of generating 234 MW from three 78 MW generators, producing about 359 million kWh each year. Up to 217.5 m^{3}/s (7,680 cu ft/s) of water can be discharged through the power plant. The tailrace of the power plant discharges directly to the reservoir of the Qingshan Dam downstream. From here, water released from Techi flows through four more hydroelectric plants at Qingshan, Kukuan, Tienlun, and Ma'an dams, which collectively generate about 2.4 billion kWh per year. Water stored and released from Techi Dam also supports irrigation in the lower Daxia River valley, and reduces flood crests at the downstream Shihgang Dam by up to 2 m (6.6 ft).

== See also ==
- List of power stations in Taiwan
- List of dams and reservoirs in Taiwan
- Electricity sector in Taiwan

== Works cited ==
- Reservoirs and Weirs in Taiwan (in Chinese). Taiwan Water Resources Agency, Ministry of Public Affairs. pp. 326–327.
