= List of dams and reservoirs in Taiwan =

This is a partial listing of dams and reservoirs in Taiwan (Republic of China).

== List of dams and reservoirs ==
Active
Defunct

Image	Dam	Type	Reservoir	River	Location	Completed
	Agongdian Dam		Agongdian Reservoir	Agongdian River	Yanchao, Kaohsiung	1953
	Baihe Dam		Baihe Reservoir	Jishui River	Baihe, Tainan	1965
	Baling Dam			Dahan River	Taoyuan	
	Banli Dam		Banli Reservoir		Lienchiang County	
	Baoshan Dam	Embankment	Baoshan Reservoir	Touqian River	Baoshan, Hsinchu County	1984
	Baoshan Second Dam		Baoshan Second Reservoir	Touqian River	Baoshan, Hsinchu County	2006
	Chenggong Dam		Chenggong Reservoir		Huxi, Penghu County	1973
	Chengqing Lake Dam		Chengqing Lake		Niaosong, Kaohsiung	1940
	Chichi Weir			Zhuoshui River	Nantou County	
	Chikan Underground Dam				Baisha, Penghu County	1986
	Chimei Dam		Chimei Reservoir		Cimei, Penghu County	1991
	Chingtian Dam		Chingtian Reservoir		Kinmen County	
	Chipan Dam				Hualien County	
	Chouchin Dam		Chouchin Reservoir		Green Island, Taitung County	1997
	Dapu Dam	Gravity dam	Dapu Reservoir	Zhonggang River	Emei, Hsinchu County	1960
	Deyuanpi Dam		Deyuanpi Reservoir		Liouying, Tainan	1956
	Dongwei Dam		Dongwei Reservoir		Magong, Penghu County	1980
	Dongyong Dam		Dongyong Reservoir		Lienchiang County	
	Feicui Dam	Arch dam	Feicui Reservoir	Xindian River	Shiding, New Taipei City	1987
	Fengshan Dam		Fengshan Reservoir		Siaogang, Kaohsiung	1984
	Green Grass Lake Dam		Green Grass Lake Reservoir	Keya Creek	East District, Hsinchu	1956
	Guanyinhu Dam		Guanyinhu Reservoir	Houjin River	Renwu, Kaohsiung	1920
	Houchun Weir			Dahan River	New Taipei City	
	Hushan Dam		Hushan Reservoir	Zhuoshui River	Douliu, Yunlin County	2016
	Hutoupi Dam		Hutoupi Reservoir		Sinhua, Tainan	1863
	Jianshanpi Dam		Jianshanpi Reservoir	Jishui River	Liouying, Tainan	1939
	Jiantan Dam		Jiantan Reservoir	Zhonggang River	Zaoqiao, Miaoli County	1957
	Jingmian Dam		Jingmian Reservoir	Zengwen River	Nanhua, Tainan	1980
	Kukuan Dam	Arch dam	Kukuan Reservoir	Dajia River	Heping, Taichung	1961
	Lantan Dam		Lantan Lake	Bazhang River	East District, Chiayi	1944
	Liyutan Dam	Embankment	Liyutan Reservoir	Da'an River	Sanyi, Miaoli County	1992
	Luliaoshi Dam		Luliaoshi Reservoir	Bazhang River	Baihe, Tainan	1939
	Longluan Lake Dam		Longluan Lake		Hengchun, Pingtung County	1958
	Ma'an Dam	Barrage	Ma'an Reservoir	Dajia River	Heping, Taichung	1998
	Meinong Lake Dam		Meinong Lake		Meinong, Kaohsiung	1920
	Mingde Dam	Rock-fill	Mingde Reservoir	Laotianliao Creek	Touwu, Miaoli County	1970
	Minghu Dam	Gravity	Minghu Reservoir	Shuili River	Shuili, Nantou County	1985
	Mingtan Dam	Concrete gravity	Mingtan Reservoir	Shuili River	Shuili, Nantou County	1995
	Mudan Dam		Mudan Reservoir	Shihtong Creek	Mudan, Pingtung County	1995
	Mugua Dam				Hualien County	
	Nanhua Dam	Earth-fill	Nanhua Reservoir	Houku River	Nanhua, Tainan	1994
	Neipuzi Dam		Neipuzi Reservoir		Minxiong, Chiayi	1942
	Qingshan Dam	Gravity	Qingshan Reservoir	Dajia River	Heping, Taichung	1970
	Renyitan Dam	Embankment	Renyitan Reservoir	Bazhang River	Fanlu, Chiayi County	1987
	Ronghua Dam		Ronhua Reservoir	Dahan River	Fuxing, Taoyuan	1984
	Shigang Dam			Dajia River	Taichung City	
	Shimen Dam	Rock-fill	Shimen Reservoir	Dahan River	Fuxing, Taoyuan	1964
	Shuilien Dam				Hualien County	
	Sun Moon Lake		Sun Moon Lake	Shuili River	Yuchi, Nantou County	1934
	Techi Dam	Concrete thin arch	Techi Reservoir	Dajia River	Heping, Taichung	1974
	Tianpu Dam		Tianpu Reservoir		Jinsha, Kinmen County	
	Tienlun Dam	Gravity	Tienlun Reservoir	Dajia River	Heping, Taichung	1956
	Toushe Dam		Toushe Reservoir	Shuili River	Yuchi, Nantou County	1979
	Wugou Dam		Wugou Reservoir		Penghu County	
	Wujie Dam	Gravity	Wujie Reservoir	Zhuoshui River	Ren'ai, Nantou County	1934
	Wushantou Dam	Rock-fill	Wushantou Reservoir	Zengwen River	Guantian, Tainan	1930
	Wushe Dam	Arch-gravity dam	Wushe Reservoir	Zhuoshui River	Ren'ai, Nantou County	1960
	Xian Dam		Xian Reservoir		Wangan, Penghu County	
	Xiaochi Dam		Xiaochi Reservoir		Xiyu, Penghu County	1996
	Xingren Dam		Xingren Reservoir		Magong, Penghu County	1979
	Xinshan Dam	Embankment	Xinshan Reservoir	Keelung River	Anle, Keelung	1980
	Xishi Dam		Xishi Reservoir	Keelung River	Nuannuan, Keelung	1926
	Yongheshan Dam		Yongheshan Reservoir	Zhonggang River	Sanwan, Miaoli County	1984
	Yanshuipi Dam		Yanshuipi Reservoir	Yanshui River	Sinhua, Tainan	1955
	Yuanshan Weir			Dahan River	New Taipei City	
	Zengwen Dam	Earth-fill	Zengwen Reservoir	Zengwen River	Dapu, Chiayi County	1973

== See also ==
- List of power stations in Taiwan
