= Hsiahsing Power Plant =

Power plant in Jinhu, Kinmen, Taiwan

- Official name: 夏興發電廠
- Country: Taiwan
- Location: Jinhu, Kinmen, Taiwan
- Coordinates: 24°26′26″N 118°23′56″E
- Status: Operational
- Commission date: 20 July 1982 (unit 1-2); 17 November 1989 (unit 3); 3 May 1993(unit 4-6)
- Owner: Taipower
- Operator: Taipower

Thermal power station
- Primary fuel: Diesel fuel

Power generation
- Nameplate capacity: 20.31 MW

The Hsiahsing Power Plant (traditional Chinese: 夏興發電廠; simplified Chinese: 夏兴发电厂; pinyin: Xiàxìng Fādiànchǎng) is a fuel-fired power plant in Jinhu Township, Kinmen County, Taiwan.

== History ==
The first two units of the power plant were commissioned on 20 July 1982. On 17 November 1989, the 3rd unit of the plant went into operation and on 3 May 1993, the fourth, fifth and sixth units went into operation. After the Tashan Power Plant in Jincheng Township went into operation in October 2000, Hsiahsing Power Plant was used for military purpose. In May 2020, an energy storage system was built for the plant, which consists of 1 MWh lithium-ion battery, 2 MW power conditioner, energy management system and environment management system.

== Technical specifications ==
The primary fuel for the power plant is diesel. It has a total combined installed generation capacity of 20.31 MW.

== See also ==
- List of power stations in Taiwan
- Electricity sector in Taiwan
