= Hsingyuan Power Plant =

Power plant in Lukang, Changhua County, Taiwan

Hsingyuan Power Plant 星元電廠
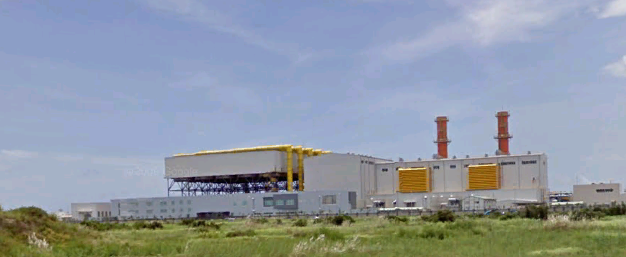
- Country: Republic of China
- Location: Lukang, Changhua County, Taiwan
- Coordinates: 24°4′47″N 120°24′45″E
- Status: Operational
- Construction began: 2005
- Commission date: March 2009
- Construction cost: NT$10.6 billion (US$337 million)
- Owner: Star Buck Power Corporation
- Operator: Star Buck Power Corporation

Thermal power station
- Primary fuel: Natural gas

Power generation
- Units operational: 2 (gas); 1 (steam); 2 (heat recovery steam)
- Make and model: General Electric, Toshiba, Doosan
- Nameplate capacity: 490 MW

External links
- Commons: Related media on Commons

The Hsingyuan Power Plant or Star Buck Power Plant (traditional Chinese: 星元電廠; simplified Chinese: 星元电厂; pinyin: Xīngyuán Diànchǎng) is a gas-fired power plant in Chang-Bin Industrial Park, Lukang Township, Changhua County, Taiwan.

== History ==
In April 2005, Hsing-yuan Power Corporation was approved by the government to construct the Hsingyuan Power Plant at a cost of NT$10.6 billion. The permit was then issued by the Ministry of Economic Affairs. Construction of the plant started at the end of 2005 and the plant was commissioned in March 2009. It went into full operation in June 2009.

== Technical specifications ==
The power plant has a total installed generation capacity of 490 MW.

== See also ==
- List of power stations in Taiwan
- Electricity sector in Taiwan
