= Kuokuang Power Plant =

Power station in Guishan, Taoyuan City, Taiwan

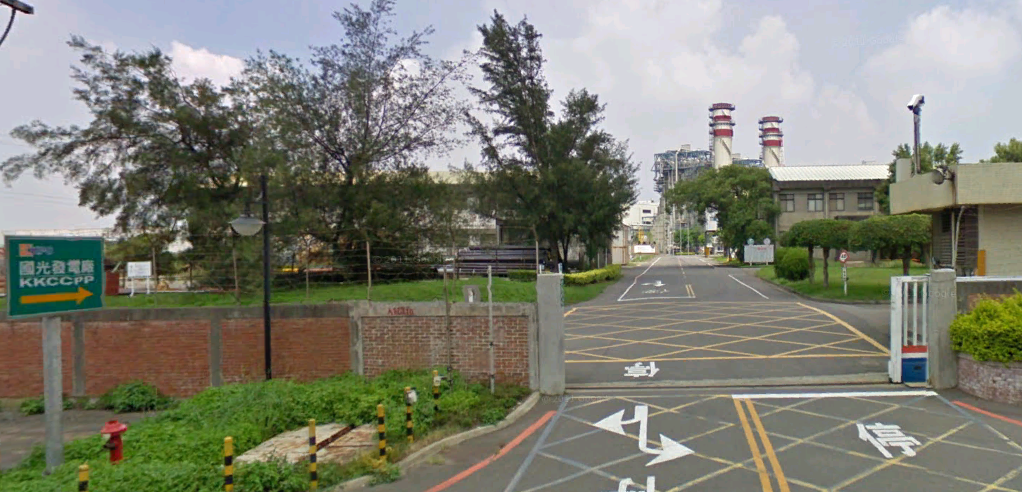
- Official name: 國光發電廠
- Country: Republic of China
- Location: Guishan, Taoyuan, Taiwan
- Coordinates: 25°2′33″N 121°20′31″E
- Status: Operational
- Commission date: November 2003
- Owner: Kuo Kuang Power Corporation
- Operator: Kuo Kuang Power Corporation

Thermal power station
- Primary fuel: Natural gas

Power generation
- Units operational: 3
- Nameplate capacity: 480 MW

External links
- Commons: Related media on Commons

The Kuokuang Power Plant (traditional Chinese: 國光發電廠; simplified Chinese: 国光发电厂; pinyin: Guóguāng Fādiànchǎng) is a gas-fired power plant in Guishan District, Taoyuan City, Taiwan. At a total capacity of 480 MW, it is currently Taiwan's smallest gas-fired power plant.

== History ==
The power plant was commissioned in November 2003.

== Management ==
The power plant is owned and operated by Kuo Kuang Power Corporation. It isa company owned by China National Petroleum Corporation [CPC] (45%), CTCI Taiwan (20%) and Meiya Power Company (35%).

== See also ==
- List of power stations in Taiwan
- Electricity sector in Taiwan
