= Kukuan Dam =

Dam in Heping, Taichung, Taiwan

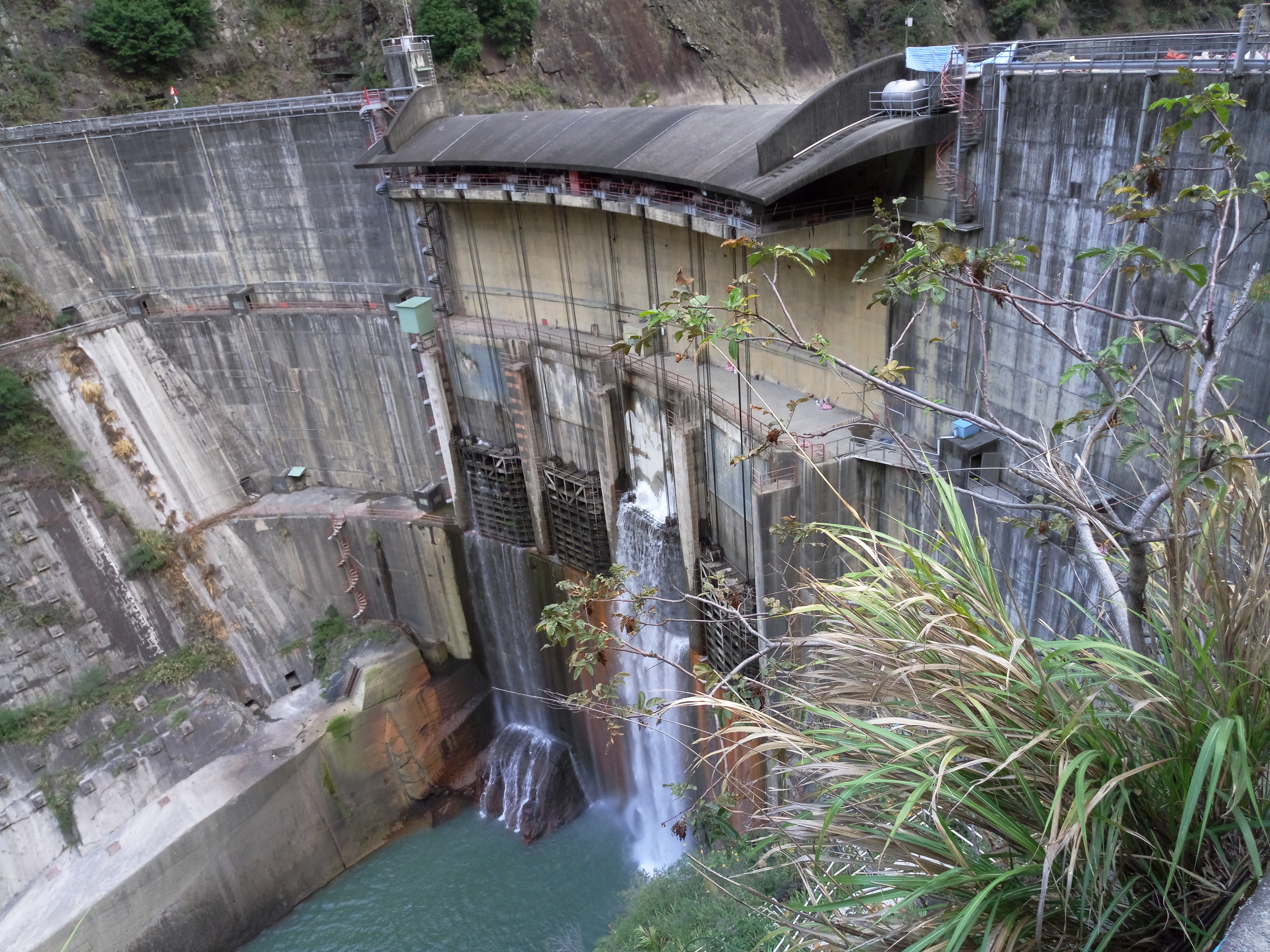

- Location within Taichung
- Official name: 谷關水庫
- Location: Heping, Taichung, Taiwan
- Coordinates: 24°14′00.91″N 121°04′34.09″E
- Purpose: Power
- Construction began: 1957; 69 years ago
- Opening date: 1961; 65 years ago

Dam and spillways
- Impounds: Dajia River
- Length: 149 m (489 ft)

Reservoir
- Total capacity: 13,200,000 m^{3}

Power Station
- Type: Conventional
- Turbines: 4 X 45 MW
- Installed capacity: 180 MW
- Annual generation: 507 GWh

Kukuan Dam (traditional Chinese: 谷關水庫; simplified Chinese: 谷关水库; pinyin: Gǔguān Shuǐkù) is a concrete thin arch dam on the Dajia River in Heping District, Taichung, Taiwan. The dam serves for hydroelectric power generation and flood control, and is the third in a cascade of hydroelectric dams on the Dajia River, being located below the Techi and Qingshan dams and upstream from the Tienlun Dam. The dam supplies water to a power station consisting of four 45 megawatt (MW) turbines for a total capacity of 180 MW, generating 507 million kilowatt hours per year.

The dam was built between 1957 and 1961 and stands 85.1 m (279 ft) high and 149 m (489 ft) long, holding up to 13,200,000 m^{3} (10,700 acre⋅ft) of water.

== See also ==
- List of power stations in Taiwan
- List of dams and reservoirs in Taiwan
- Electricity sector in Taiwan
