= Qingshan Dam =

Dam in Heping, Taichung, Taiwan

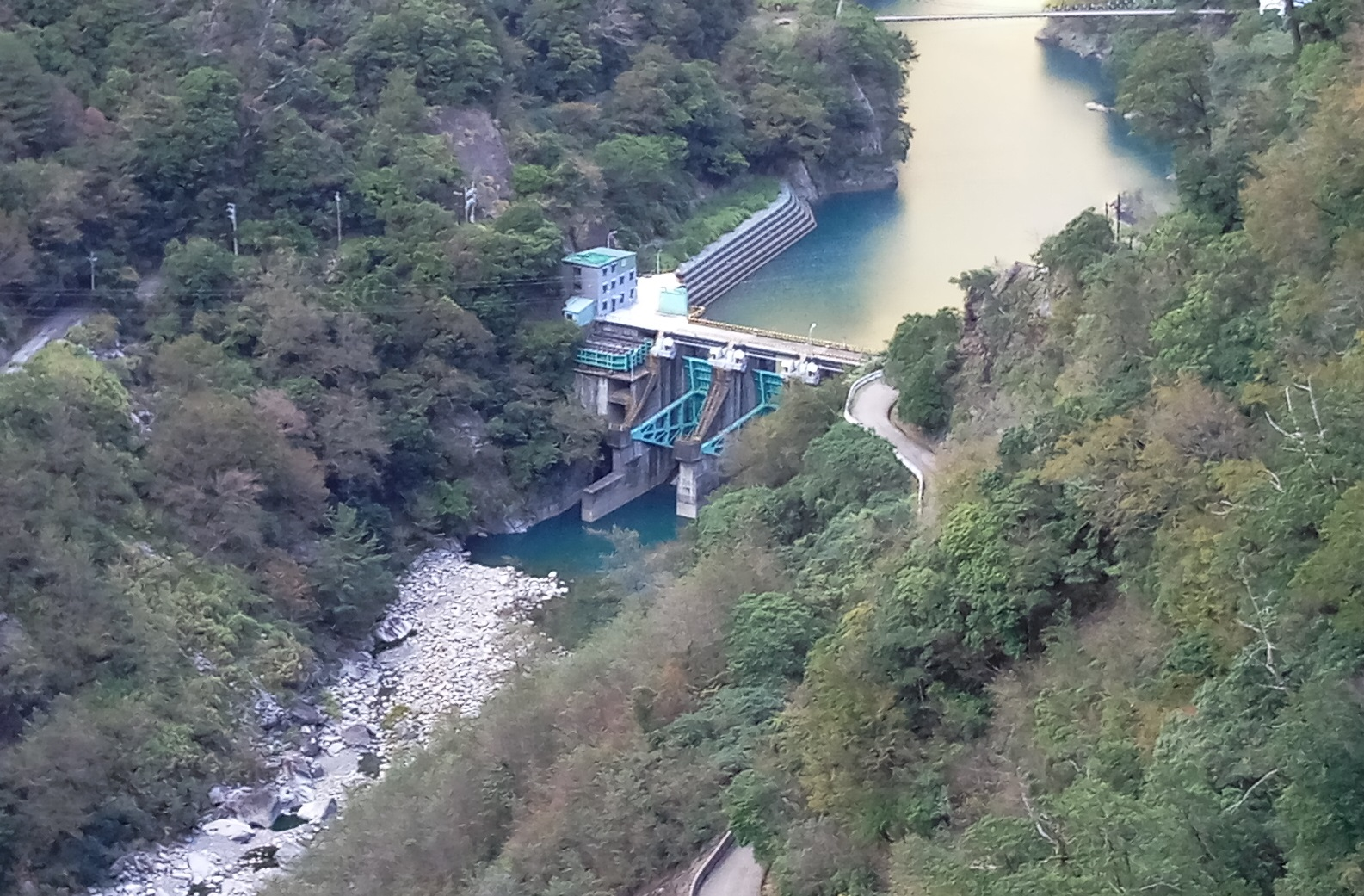
- Interactive map of Qingshan Dam
- Official name: 青山壩
- Location: Heping, Taichung, Taiwan
- Coordinates: 24°15′11.5″N 121°09′37.0″E
- Construction began: 1964; 62 years ago
- Opening date: 1970; 56 years ago

Dam and spillways
- Impounds: Dajia River
- Length: 100 m (330 ft)

Reservoir
- Total capacity: 600,000 m^{3}

Power Station
- Turbines: 4 X 90 MW
- Installed capacity: 360 MW
- Annual generation: 591 GWh

Qingshan Dam (traditional Chinese: 青山壩; simplified Chinese: 青山坝; Hanyu Pinyin: Qīngshān Bà; Tongyong Pinyin: Cingshan Bà; Wade–Giles: Ch'ing^{1}-shan^{1} Pa^{4}) is a concrete gravity forebay dam on the Dajia River in Heping District, Taichung, Taiwan. The dam is the second in a cascade of hydroelectric power plants along the Dajia River, and is located directly below the Techi Dam and upstream of the Kukuan Dam. The dam was built between 1964 and 1970 and stands 45 m (148 ft) high and 100 m (330 ft) long, storing up to 600,000 m^{3} (490 acre⋅ft) in its reservoir.

The dam supplies water to a power station with a capacity of 360 megawatts (MW) from four 90 MW turbines, generating 591 million kilowatt hours annually. It is the largest of the hydroelectric plants along the Dajia River.

== See also ==
- List of power stations in Taiwan
- List of dams and reservoirs in Taiwan
- Electricity sector in Taiwan
