= Linkou Power Plant =

Power plant in Linkou, New Taipei, Taiwan

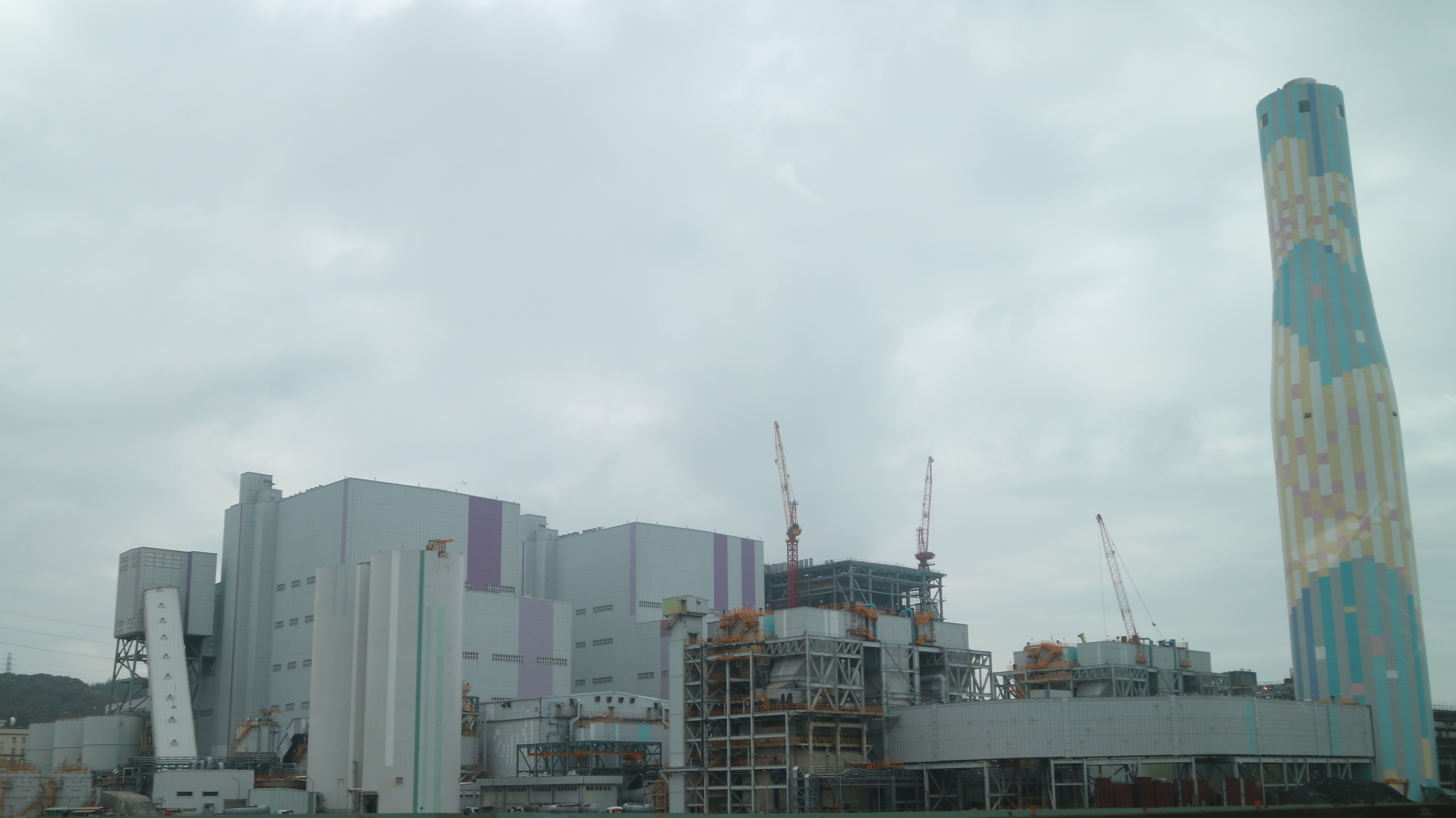
- Official name: 林口發電廠
- Country: Republic of China
- Location: Linkou, New Taipei, Taiwan
- Coordinates: 25°07′15″N 121°17′54″E
- Status: Operational
- Construction began: August 1965
- Commission date: 18 July 1968 (old Unit 1); 17 March 1972 (old Unit 2); 6 October 2016 (Unit 1); 24 March 2017 (Unit 2)
- Decommission date: 1 September 2014 (old Unit 1-2)
- Owner: Taipower
- Operator: Taipower

Thermal power station
- Primary fuel: Coal

Power generation
- Nameplate capacity: 3 X 800 MW

External links
- Commons: Related media on Commons

The Linkou Power Plant (traditional Chinese: 林口發電廠; simplified Chinese: 林口发电厂; pinyin: Línkǒu Fādiànchǎng) is a coal-fired power plant in Linkou District, New Taipei, Taiwan. With the previous total installed capacity of 600 MW, the power plant used to be the smallest coal-fired power plant in Taiwan. The power plant is currently undergoing retrofitting to increase its installed generation capacity to 2.4 GW.

== Events ==
=== 1968 ===
The power plant began its operation on 18 July 1968 after a successful train run of its first 300 MW giant electric generator which started two weeks before.

=== 2014 ===
On 1 September 2014, the current two unit generators were decommissioned.

=== 2016 ===
On 6 October 2016, the plant completed its refurbishment of its old two units and commissioned the new one supercritical unit of 800 MW.

=== 2017 ===
On 24 March 2017, the second of the 800 MW unit was commissioned.

=== 2019 ===
One 800 MW ultra supercritical coal-fired unit has been built by Mitsubishi Heavy Industries and CTCI Corporation at the plant. On 24 October 2019, the third unit was commissioned.

== Technical specifications ==
The power plant consists of three generating units with a total installed capacity of 2,400 MW. Each generating unit has an installed capacity of 800 MW.

== Transportation ==
Linkou Power Plant is accessible north of Shanbi Station of Taoyuan Metro.

== See also ==
- List of power stations in Taiwan
- Electricity sector in Taiwan
