= Chenggong Reservoir =

Reservoir in Huxi, Penghu, Taiwan

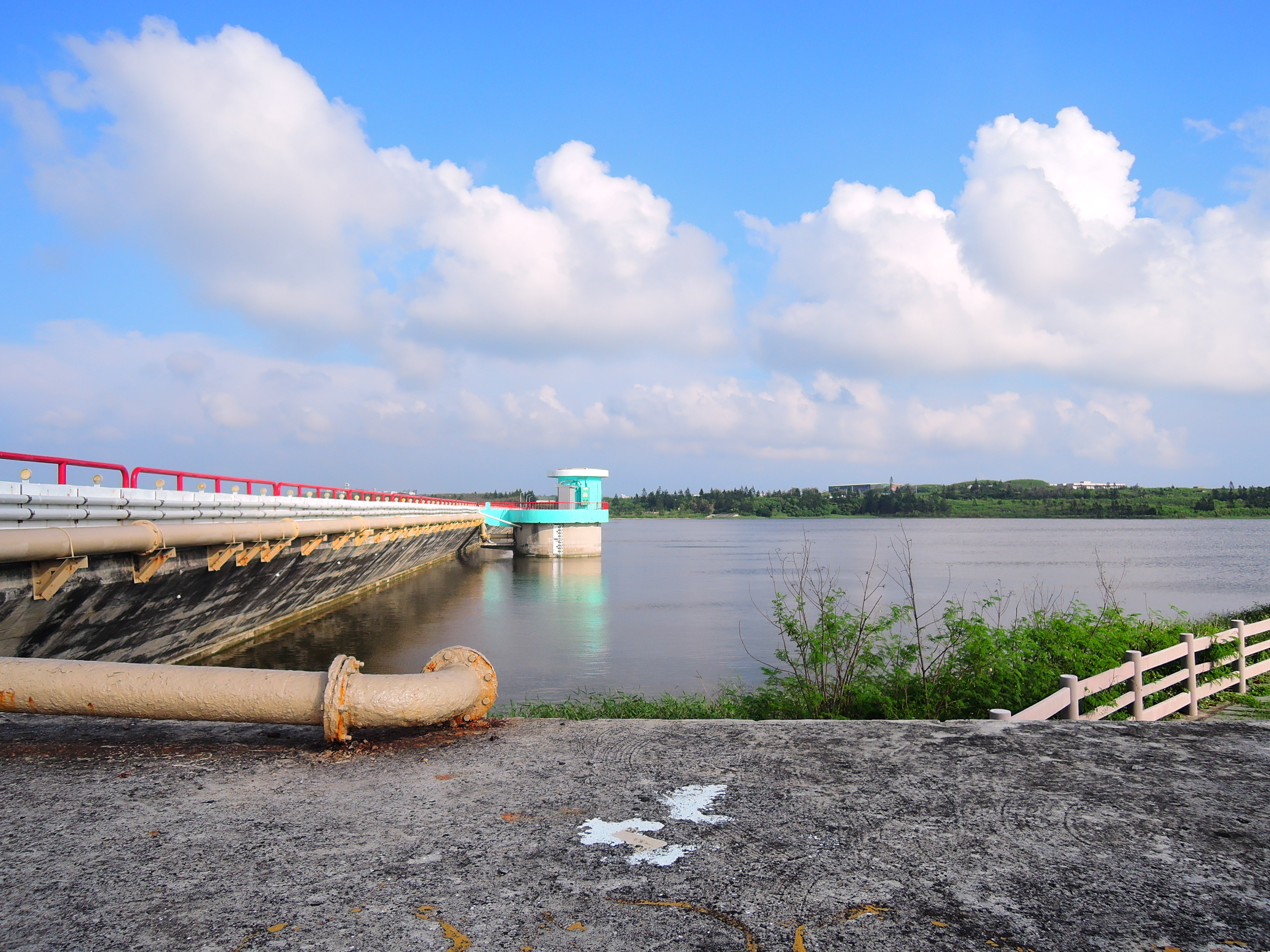
- Dam of Chenggong Reservoir

- Location within Taiwan
- Coordinates: 23°34′32″N 119°37′26″E
- Purpose: public water supply
- Construction began: October 1972

Chenggong Reservoir (traditional Chinese: 成功水庫; simplified Chinese: 成功水库; pinyin: Chénggōng shuǐkù), also known as Chengkung Reservoir, Cheng Kung Reservoir, is a reservoir on the Penghu Islands, located in Chenggong Village, Huxi Township, Penghu County, Taiwan.

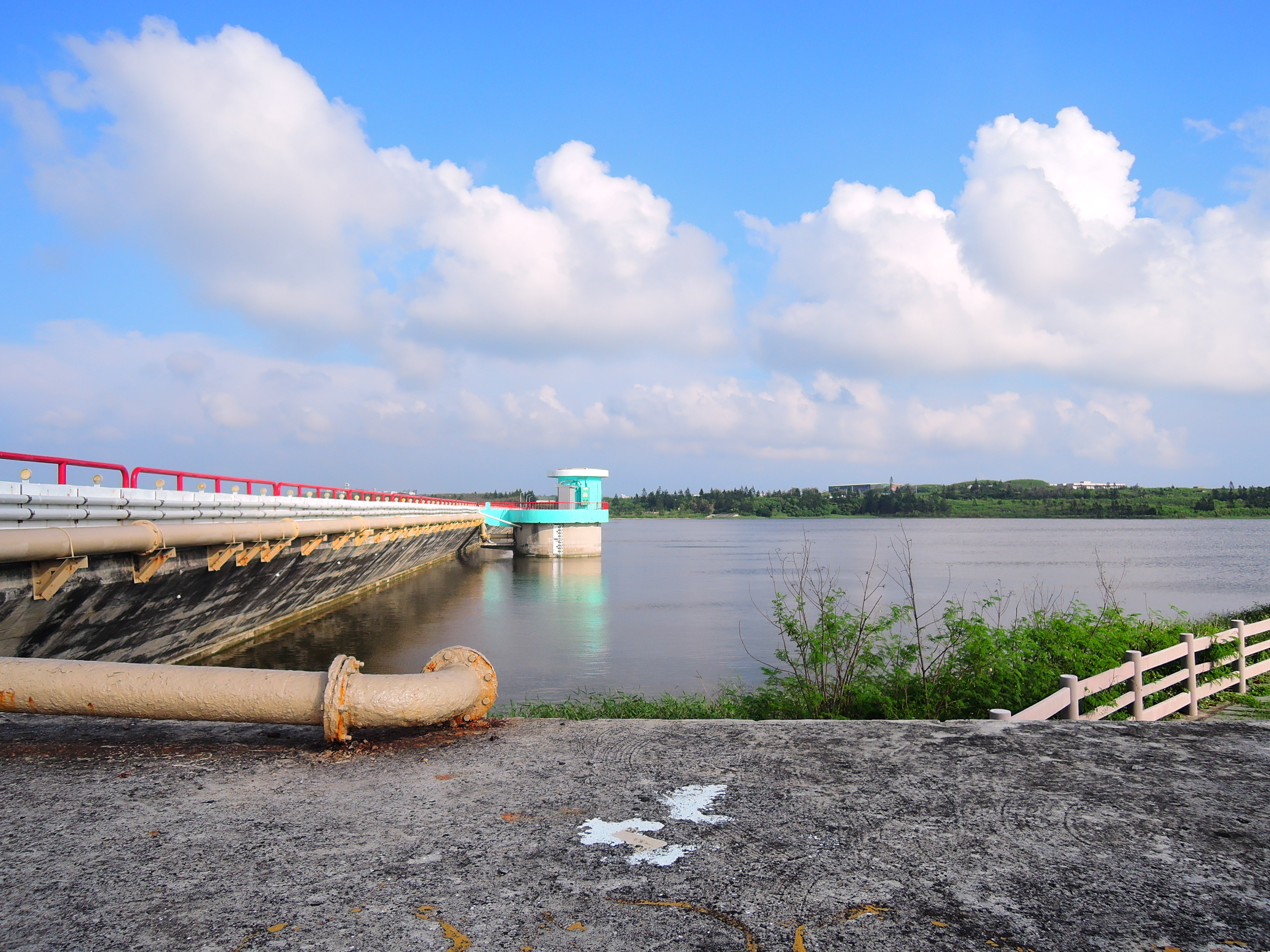

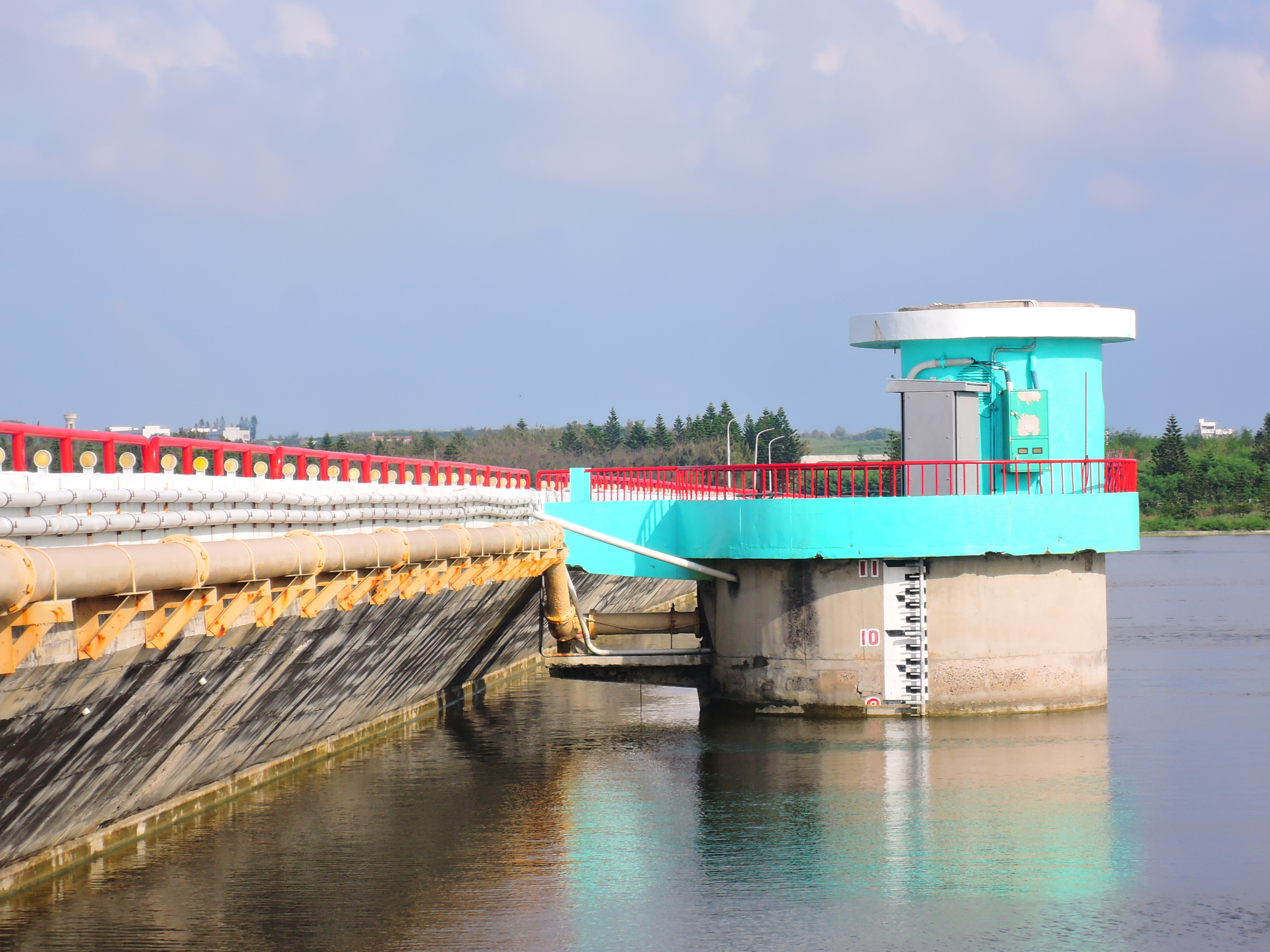

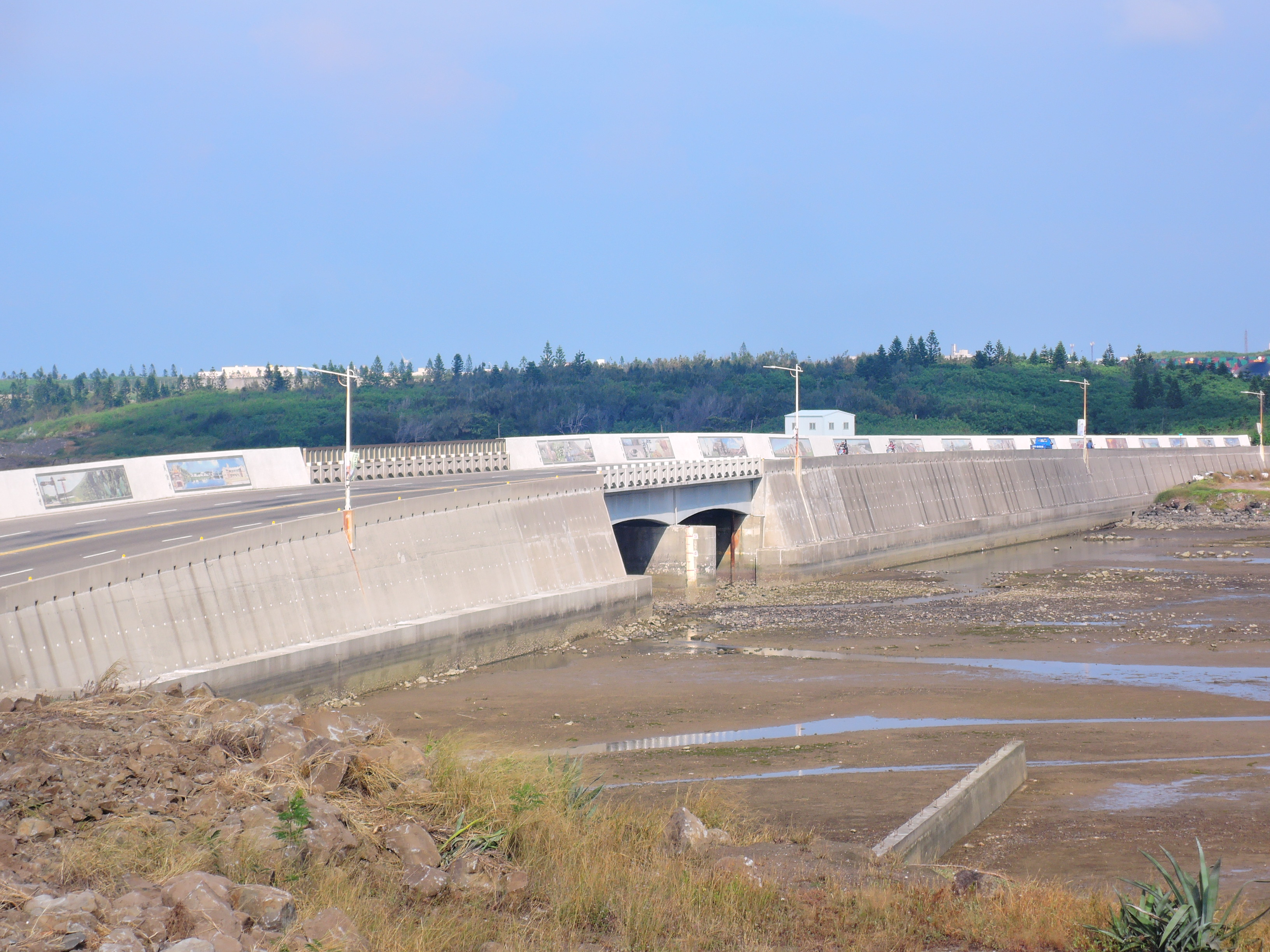

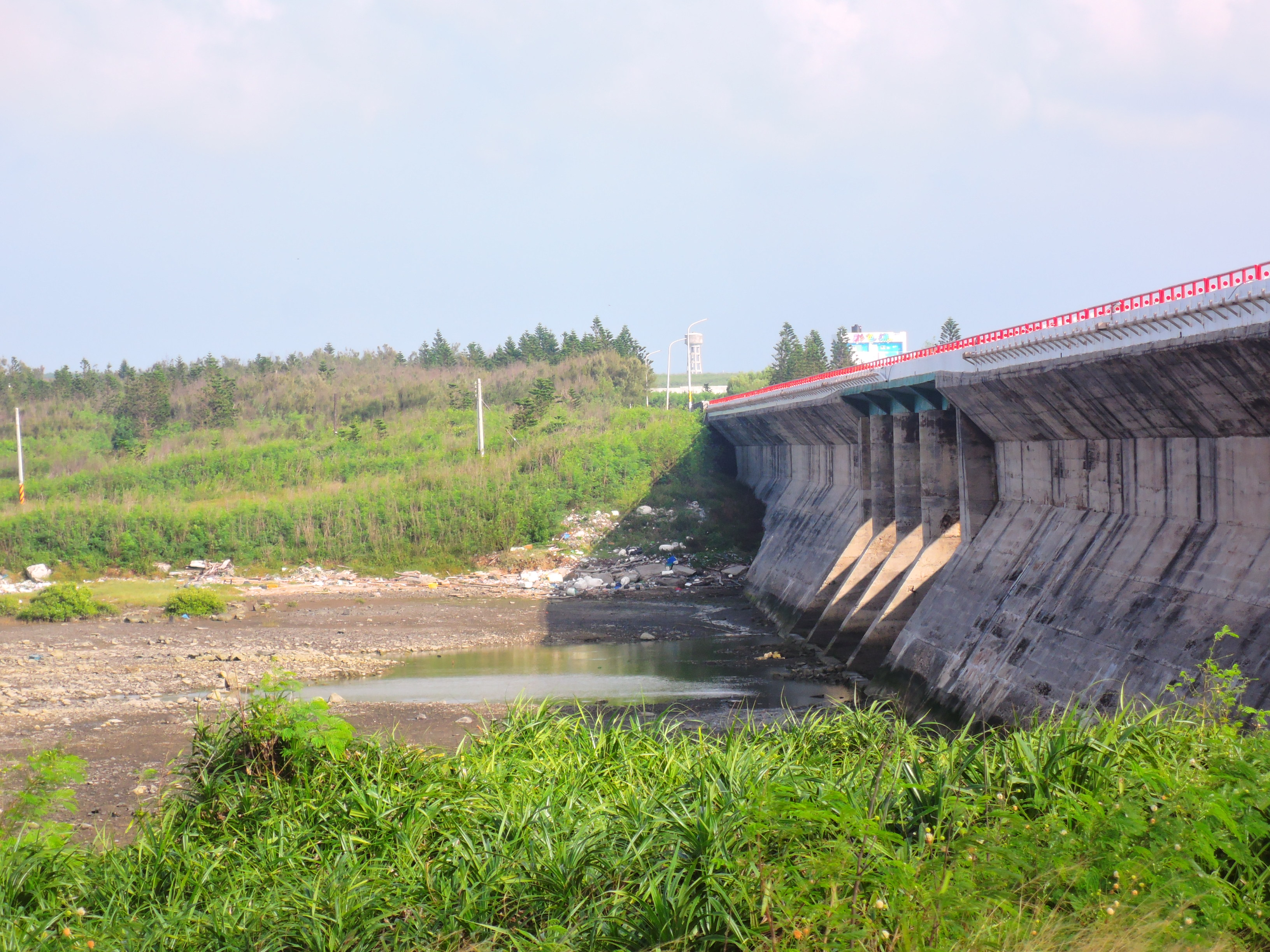

The construction of Chenggong Reservoir started in October 1972, and was completed in December 1973. As of April 1, 2021, the reservoir has a total storage capacity of 1.21 million cubic meters and an effective capacity of 1.21 million cubic meters. It is the biggest and the oldest reservoir in Penghu County.

== See also ==
- List of dams and reservoirs in Taiwan
