= Shen'ao Power Plant =

Former power plant in Ruifang, New Taipei, Taiwan

- Official name: 深澳發電廠
- Country: Taiwan
- Location: Ruifang, New Taipei, Taiwan
- Coordinates: 25°07′38.4″N 121°48′53.9″E
- Status: Decommissioned
- Commission date: 1960
- Decommission date: 2007

Thermal power station
- Primary fuel: Coal

The Shen'ao Power Plant (traditional Chinese: 深澳發電廠; simplified Chinese: 深澳发电厂; pinyin: Shēn'ào Fādiànchǎng) was a coal-fired power plant in Ruifang District, New Taipei, Taiwan.

== History ==
The power plant started operating in 1960. In 1965, trains began carrying coal to the power plant from coal mines in Ruifang. It was decommissioned in 2018.

== See also ==
- List of power stations in Taiwan
