= Beigan Power Plant =

Power plant in Beigan, Lienchiang, Taiwan

- Official name: 北竿發電廠
- Country: Taiwan
- Location: Beigan, Lienchiang, Taiwan
- Coordinates: 26°13′10″N 119°59′4″E
- Status: Decommissioned
- Commission date: 1 July 1974
- Decommission date: 2010
- Owner: Taipower
- Operator: Taipower

Thermal power station
- Primary fuel: Diesel fuel

Power generation
- Nameplate capacity: 4.976 MW

The Beigan Power Plant (traditional Chinese: 北竿發電廠; simplified Chinese: 北竿发电厂; pinyin: Běigān Fādiànchǎng), nicknamed Jun Hun, was a diesel-fuel power plant in Beigan Township, Lienchiang County, Taiwan.

== History ==
After the end of Chinese Civil War in 1949, the Government of the Republic of China which still control Matsu Islands, began to construct a power plant at the island. In order to protect the plant the People's Liberation Army attacks, it was constructed deep inside a mountain and in a concealed military tunnel, thus making it also as an air raid shelter. The power plant was commissioned on 1 July 1974.

The power plant was decommissioned in 2010. Since then, the power plant had been transformed into an art space. In late September 2023, the decommissioned plant was opened to the public in conjunction with Matsu Biennial.

== See also ==
- List of power stations in Taiwan
- Electricity sector in Taiwan
