= Tashan Power Plant =

Power plant in Jincheng, Kinmen, Taiwan

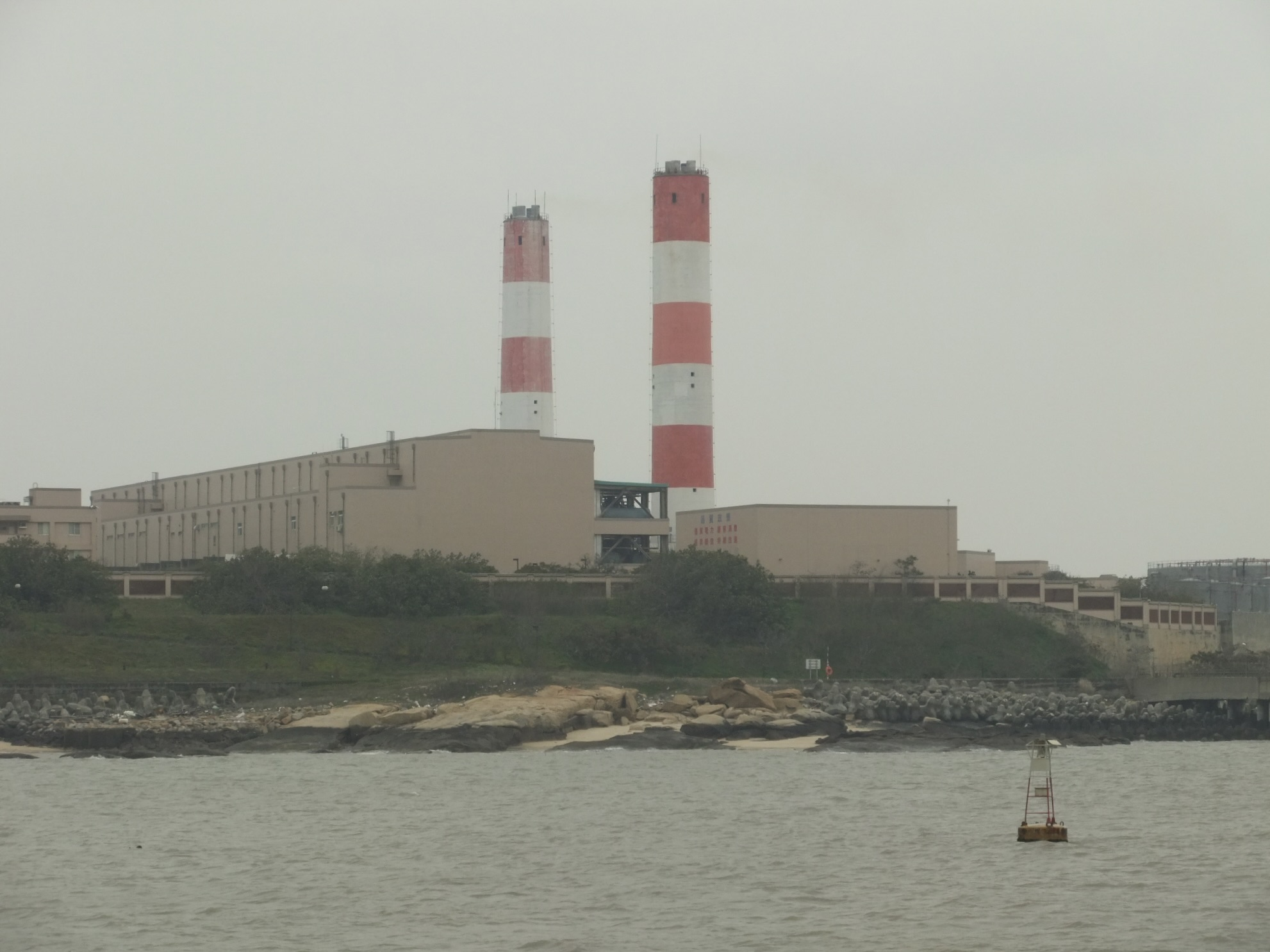
- Official name: 塔山發電廠
- Country: Taiwan
- Location: Jincheng, Kinmen
- Coordinates: 24°24′49″N 118°16′53″E
- Status: Operational
- Commission date: October 2000 (unit 1-4); February 2004 (unit 5-8)
- Owner: Taipower
- Operator: Taipower

Thermal power station
- Primary fuel: Diesel fuel

Power generation
- Nameplate capacity: 113.3 MW

External links
- Commons: Related media on Commons

The Tashan Power Plant (traditional Chinese: 塔山發電廠; simplified Chinese: 塔山发电厂; pinyin: Tǎshān Fādiànchǎng) is a fuel-fired power plant in Tashan, Shuitou Village, Jincheng Township, Kinmen County, Fujian Province, Republic of China.

== History ==
The construction to build the power plant was approved by the Executive Yuan in January 1995. The construction was then completed in October 2000 with 4 generation units, unit 1–4. In March 1998, the construction for unit 5-8 was approved by the Executive Yuan and it was commissioned in February 2004. On 6 July 2016, the Ministry of Economic Affairs approved the construction of unit 9–10. The two generation units were ordered in 2017.

== Infrastructure ==
To cope with the increasing electricity demand and generation, a petroleum transmission trestle was built in 2002 near the power plant for the transportation of diesel oil for the plant. This reduced the risk of fuel shortages.

The smokestacks of the plant are 62.4 metres tall .

== See also ==
- List of power stations in Taiwan
- Electricity sector in Taiwan
