= List of power stations in Taiwan =

Location of power stations in Taiwan, nuclear, coal/oil/gas, hydroelectric, geothermal, former

This page is a list of power stations in the Republic of China (Taiwan) that are publicly or privately owned. Non-renewable power stations are those that run on coal, fuel oils, and natural gas (mostly imported LNG), while renewable power stations run on fuel sources such as biomass, geothermal heat, moving water, solar rays, tides, waves and the wind. By the end of 2011, Taiwan had installed 41,401 MW of generating capacity across all types of power station, including nuclear power.

Among the lists of largest power stations, Taichung Power Plant is the fourth largest coal-fired power station in the world.

== Non-renewable ==
=== Coal ===
| Station | Chinese | Location | Coordinates | Capacity (MW) | Notes |
|---|---|---|---|---|---|
| Hoping Power Plant | 和平電廠 | Xiulin, Hualien | 24°18′24″N 121°45′50″E | 1,320 | |
| Hsinta Power Plant | 興達發電廠 | Yong'an and Qieding, Kaohsiung | 22°51′26″N 120°11′49″E | 4,326 | |
| Linkou Power Plant | 林口發電廠 | Linkou, New Taipei | 25°7′15″N 121°17′54″E | 0 | Retrofitted |
| Mailiao Power Plant | 麥寮電廠 | Mailiao, Yunlin | 23°48′N 120°11′E | 4,200 | |
| Taichung Power Plant | 台中發電廠 | Longjing, Taichung | 24°12′46″N 120°28′52″E | 5,824 | |

=== Diesel ===
| Station | Chinese | Location | Coordinates | Capacity (MW) | Notes |
|---|---|---|---|---|---|
| Chienshan Power Plant | 尖山發電廠 | Huxi, Penghu | 23°33′47″N 119°39′40″E | 140 | |
| Dongyin Power Plant | 東引發電廠 | Dongyin, Lienchiang | 26°22′7.0″N 120°29′50.9″E | | |
| Hsiahsing Power Plant | 夏興發電廠 | Jinhu, Kinmen | 24°26′26″N 118°23′56″E | 20 | |
| Lanyu Power Plant | 蘭嶼發電廠 | Orchid Island, Taitung | 22°1′33.4″N 121°32′23.9″E | 6.5 | |
| Qimei Power Plant | 七美發電廠 | Cimei, Penghu | 23°12′29″N 119°25′43″E | 4 | |
| Tashan Power Plant | 塔山發電廠 | Jincheng, Kinmen | 24°24′53.26″N 118°17′17.05″E | 91 | |
| Xiju Power Plant | 西莒發電廠 | Juguang, Lienchiang | 25°58′25.4″N 119°56′07.8″E | | |
| Zhushan Power Plant | 珠山發電廠 | Nangan, Lienchiang | 26°9′13.74″N 119°56′21.28″E | 15.4 | |

=== Fuel oil ===
| Station | Chinese | Location | Coordinates | Capacity (MW) | Notes |
|---|---|---|---|---|---|
| Hsieh-ho Power Plant | 協和發電廠 | Zhongshan, Keelung | 25°9′26.38″N 121°44′21.57″E | 2,000 | |

=== Mixed ===
| Station | Chinese | Location | Coordinates | Capacity (MW) | Notes |
|---|---|---|---|---|---|
| Talin Power Plant | 大林發電廠 | Siaogang, Kaohsiung | 22°32′10″N 120°20′7.9″E | 2,400 | |

=== Natural gas ===
| Station | Chinese | Location | Coordinates | Capacity (MW) | Notes |
|---|---|---|---|---|---|
| Changsheng Power Plant | 長生發電廠 | Luzhu, Taoyuan | 25°6′59″N 121°15′30″E | 900 | |
| Chiahui Power Plant | 嘉惠電廠 | Minxiong, Chiayi | 23°32′02″N 120°28′31″E | 535 | |
| Hsingneng Power Plant | 星能電廠 | Lukang, Changhua | 24°7′38″N 120°26′01″E | 490 | |
| Hsingyuan Power Plant | 星元電廠 | Lukang, Changhua | 24°4′47″N 120°24′45″E | 490 | |
| Hsintao Power Plant | 新桃電廠 | Guanxi, Hsinchu | 22°36′3″N 120°18′2″E | 600 | |
| Kuokuang Power Plant | 國光發電廠 | Guishan, Taoyuan | 25°2′33″N 121°20′31″E | 480 | |
| Nanpu Power Plant | 南部發電廠 | Cianjhen, Kaohsiung | 22°36′3″N 120°18′2″E | 1,118 | |
| Sun Ba Power Plant | 森霸電廠 | Shanshang, Tainan | 23°04′56″N 120°21′26″E | 980 | |
| Tatan Power Plant | 大潭發電廠 | Guanyin, Taoyuan | 25°1′34″N 121°2′50″E | 4,384 | |
| Tunghsiao Power Plant | 通霄發電廠 | Tongxiao, Miaoli | 24°29′23.7″N 120°40′16″E | 1,815 | |

== Renewable ==
=== Hydroelectric ===
| Station | Chinese | Location | Coordinates | Capacity (MW) | Notes |
|---|---|---|---|---|---|
| Bihai Power Plant | 碧海發電廠 | Xiulin, Hualien | 24°20′09″N 121°40′36″E | 61.2 | |
| Cholan Power Plant | 卓蘭電廠 | Zhuolan, Miaoli | | 80 | |
| Minghu Pumped Storage Hydro Power Station | 大觀發電廠 | Shuili, Nantou | 23°51′16″N 120°52′13″E | 1,008 | |
| Techi Power Plant | 德基發電廠 | Dongshi, Heping, and Houli, Taichung | 24°15′19″N 121°10′03″E | 234 | |
| Gueishan Power Plant | 桂山發電廠 | Wulai, New Taipei | 24°54′33″N 121°34′48″E | 111 | |
| Kaoping Power Plant | 高屏發電廠 | Meinong, Kaohsiung | | 7 | |
| Kukuan Power Plant | 谷關發電廠 | Heping, Taichung | 24°14′00.91″N 121°04′34.09″E | 180 | |
| Lanyang Power Plant | 蘭陽發電廠 | Sanxing, Yilan | 24°39′16.5″N 121°36′59″E | 26 | |
| Maan Power Plant | 馬鞍發電廠 | Heping, Taichung | 24°11′03″N 120°54′50″E | 133 | |
| Mingtan Pumped Storage Hydro Power Plant | 明潭發電廠 | Shuili, Nantou | 23°50′11″N 120°52′04″E | 1,602 | |
| Qingshan Power Plant | 青山發電廠 | Heping, Taichung | 24°15′11.5″N 121°09′37″E | 360 | |
| Shihmen Power Plant | 石門發電廠 | Longtan, Taoyuan | 24°48′38″N 121°14′39″E | 130 | |
| Tienlun Power Plant | 天輪發電廠 | Heping, Taichung | 24°12′38.44″N 121°00′56.9″E | 195 | |
| Zengwen Power Plant | 曾文發電廠 | Dapu, Chiayi | 23°14′53″N 120°32′11″E | 50 | |
| Tungpu Power Plant | 東部發電廠 | Hualien County | | 183 | |
| Wanta Power Plant | 萬大發電廠 | Ren'ai, Nantou | 23°58′34″N 121°08′08″E | 36 | |

=== Geothermal ===
| Station | Chinese | Location | Coordinates | Capacity (MW) | Notes |
|---|---|---|---|---|---|
| Qingshui Geothermal Power Plant | 清水地熱發電廠 | Datong, Yilan | 24°36′44.3″N 121°38′13.1″E | 4.2 | |

== Former power plants ==
| Station | Chinese | Location | Coordinates | Capacity (MW) | Notes |
|---|---|---|---|---|---|
| Beigan Power Plant | 東引發電廠 | Beigan, Lienchiang | 26°13′10″N 119°59′4″E | 4.976 | Decommissioned |
| Beipu Power Plant | 北部發電廠 | Zhongzheng, Keelung | | | Rebuilt into the National Museum of Marine Science and Technology |
| Jinshan Nuclear Power Plant | 金山核能發電廠 (核一) | Shimen, New Taipei | 25°17′09″N 121°35′10″E | 1,208 | |
| Shen'ao Power Plant | 深澳發電廠 | Ruifang, New Taipei | 25°07′38.4″N 121°48′53.9″E | 160 | Decommissioned, under reconstruction |

=== Nuclear ===
| Station | Chinese | Location | Coordinates | Capacity (MW) | Notes |
|---|---|---|---|---|---|
| Kuosheng Nuclear Power Plant | 國聖核能發電廠 (核二) | Wanli, New Taipei | 25°12′10″N 121°39′45″E | 985 | Retired 2023 |
| Maanshan Nuclear Power Plant | 馬鞍山核能發電廠 (核三) | Hengchun, Pingtung | 21°57′30″N 120°45′5″E | 1,780 | Retired 2025 |
| Lungmen Nuclear Power Plant | 龍門核能發電廠 (核四) | Gongliao, New Taipei | 25°2′19″N 121°55′27″E | 2,700 | Construction halted |

== Figures ==
=== Coal-fired power plants ===
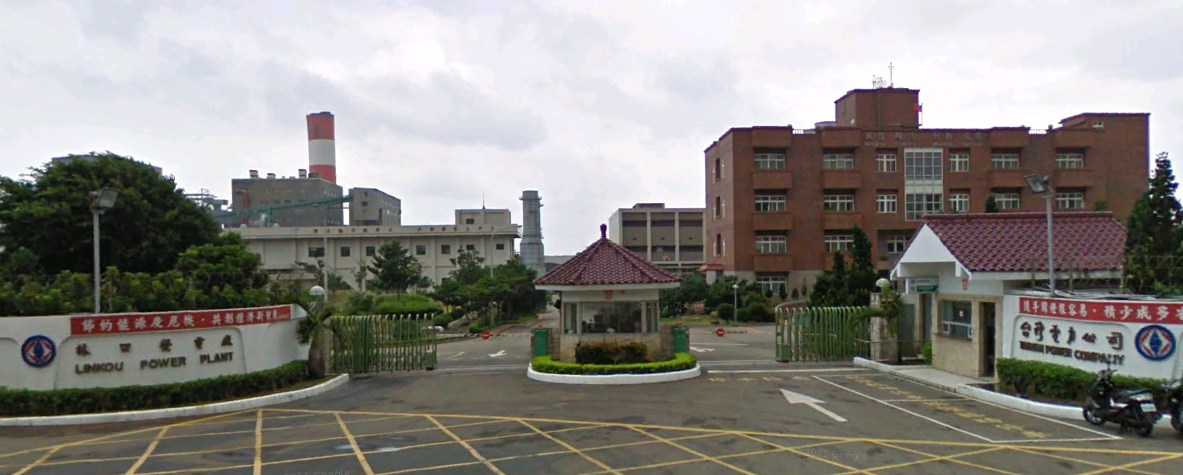
Linkou Power Plant

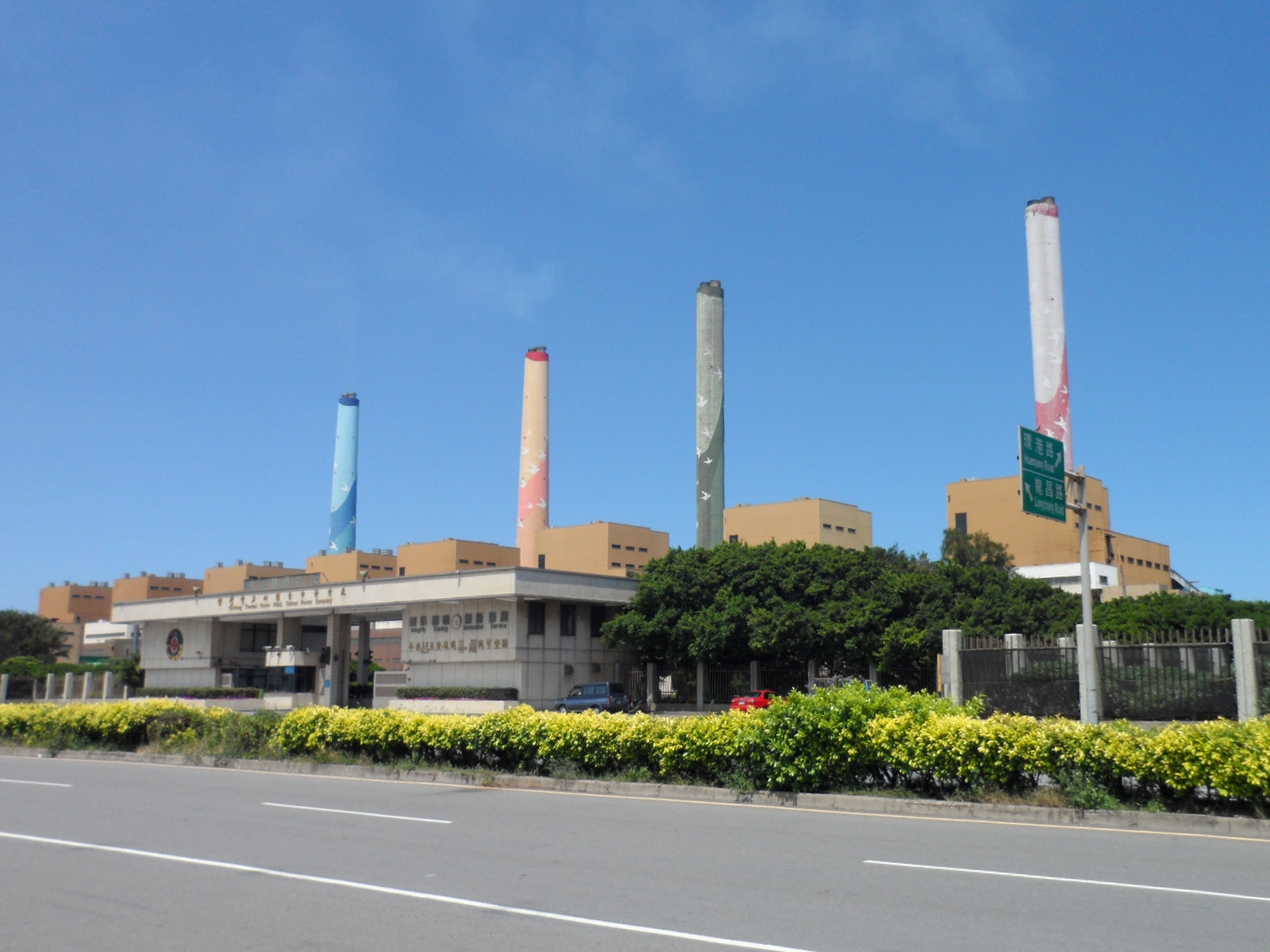
Taichung Power Plant

=== Diesel power plants ===
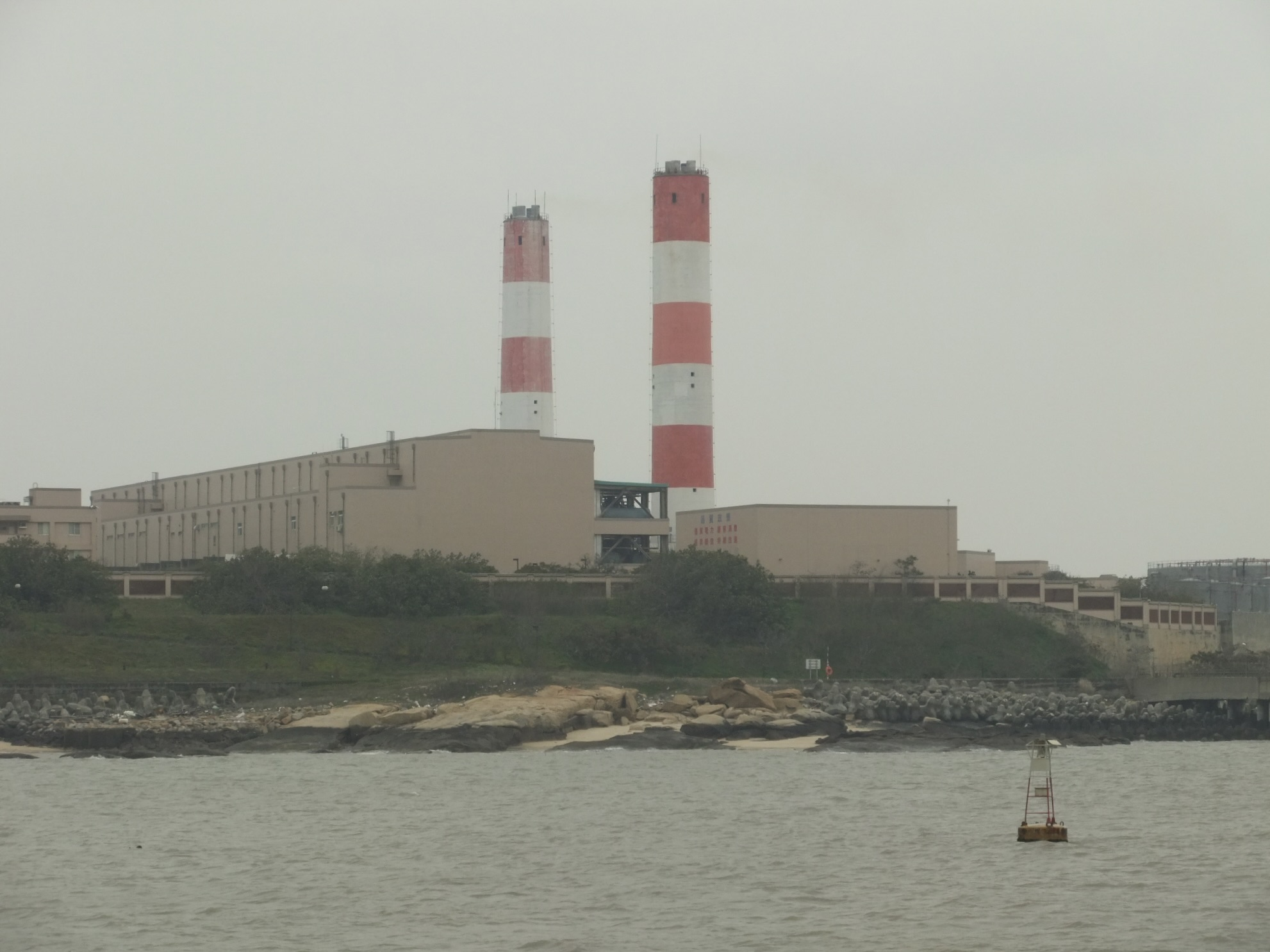
Tashan Power Plant

=== Gas-fired power plants ===
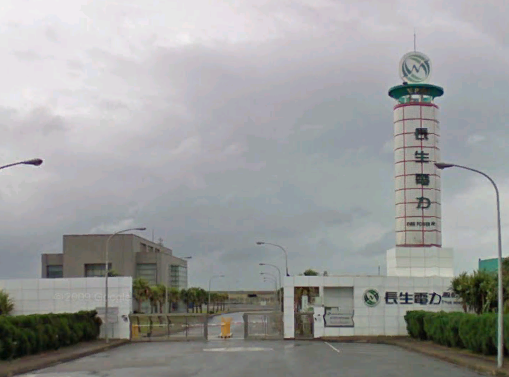
Changsheng Power Plant

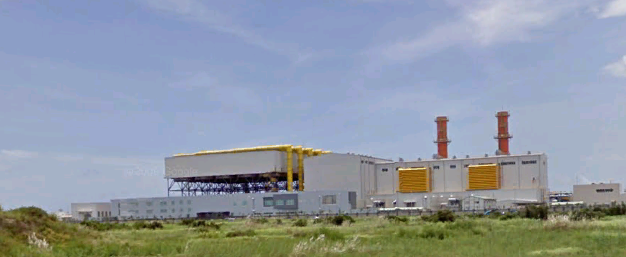
Hsingyuan Power Plant

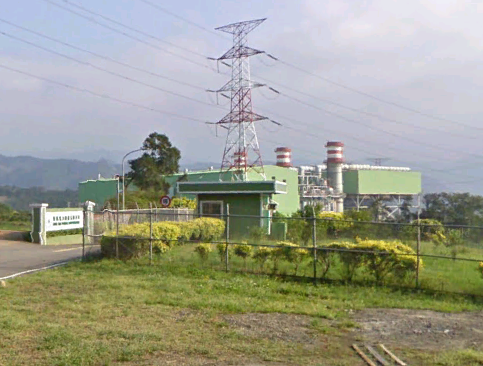
Hsintao Power Plant

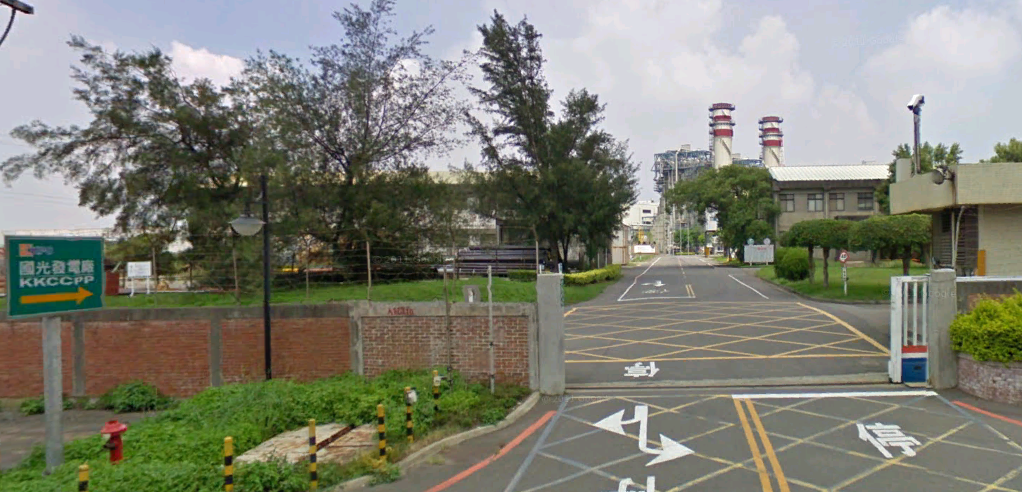
Kuokuang Power Plant

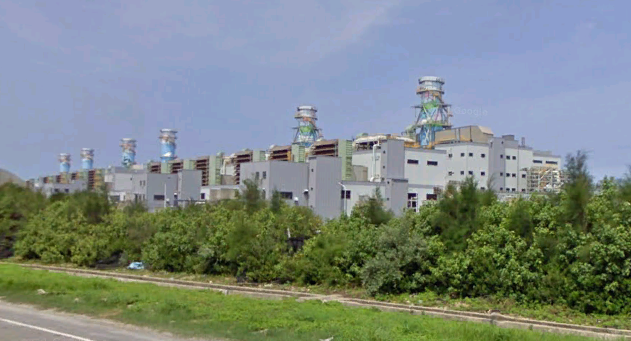
Tatan Power Plant

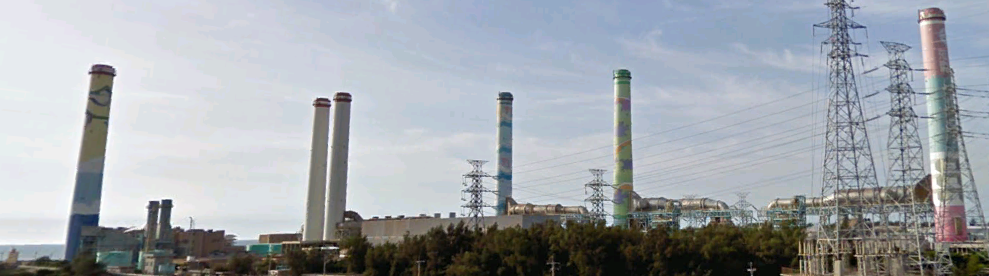
Tunghsiao Power Plant

=== Hydro power plants ===
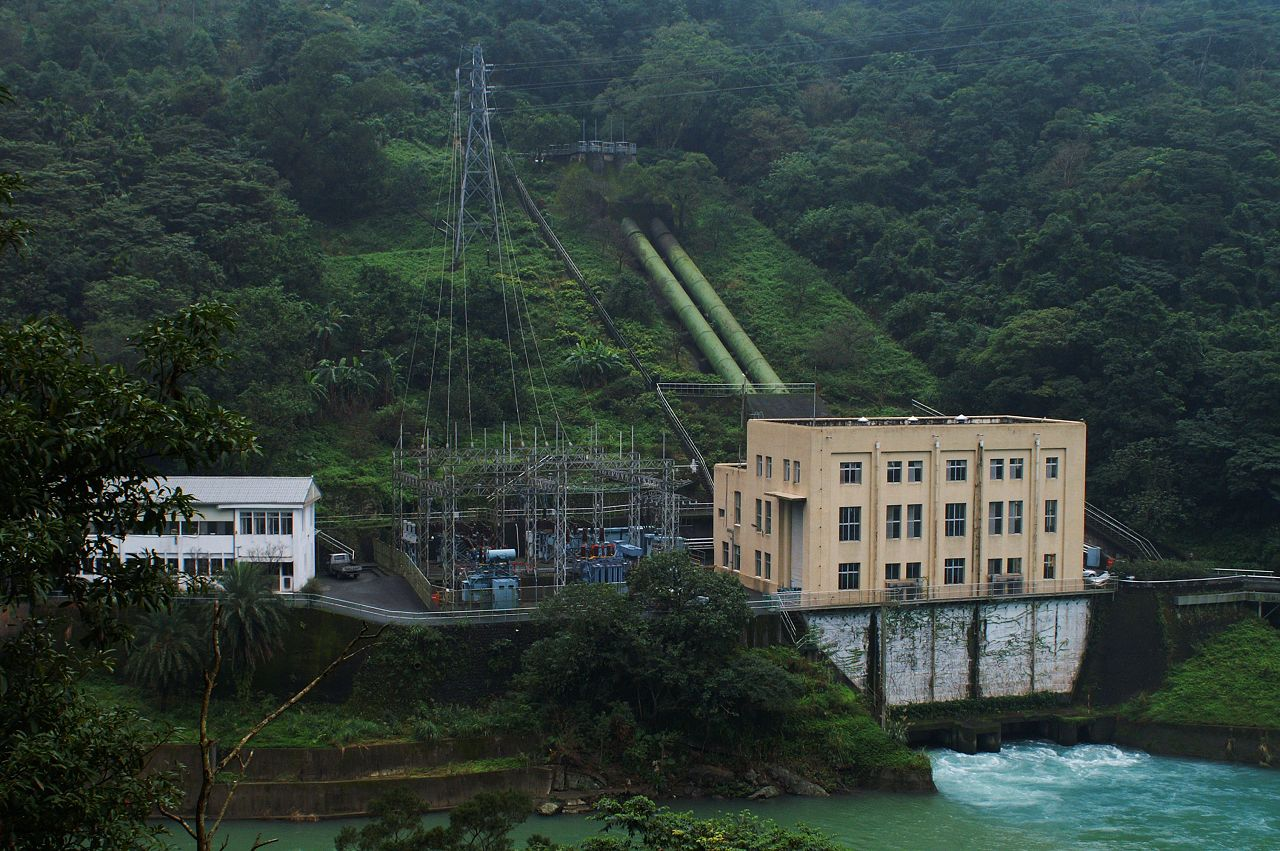
Gueishan Power Plant

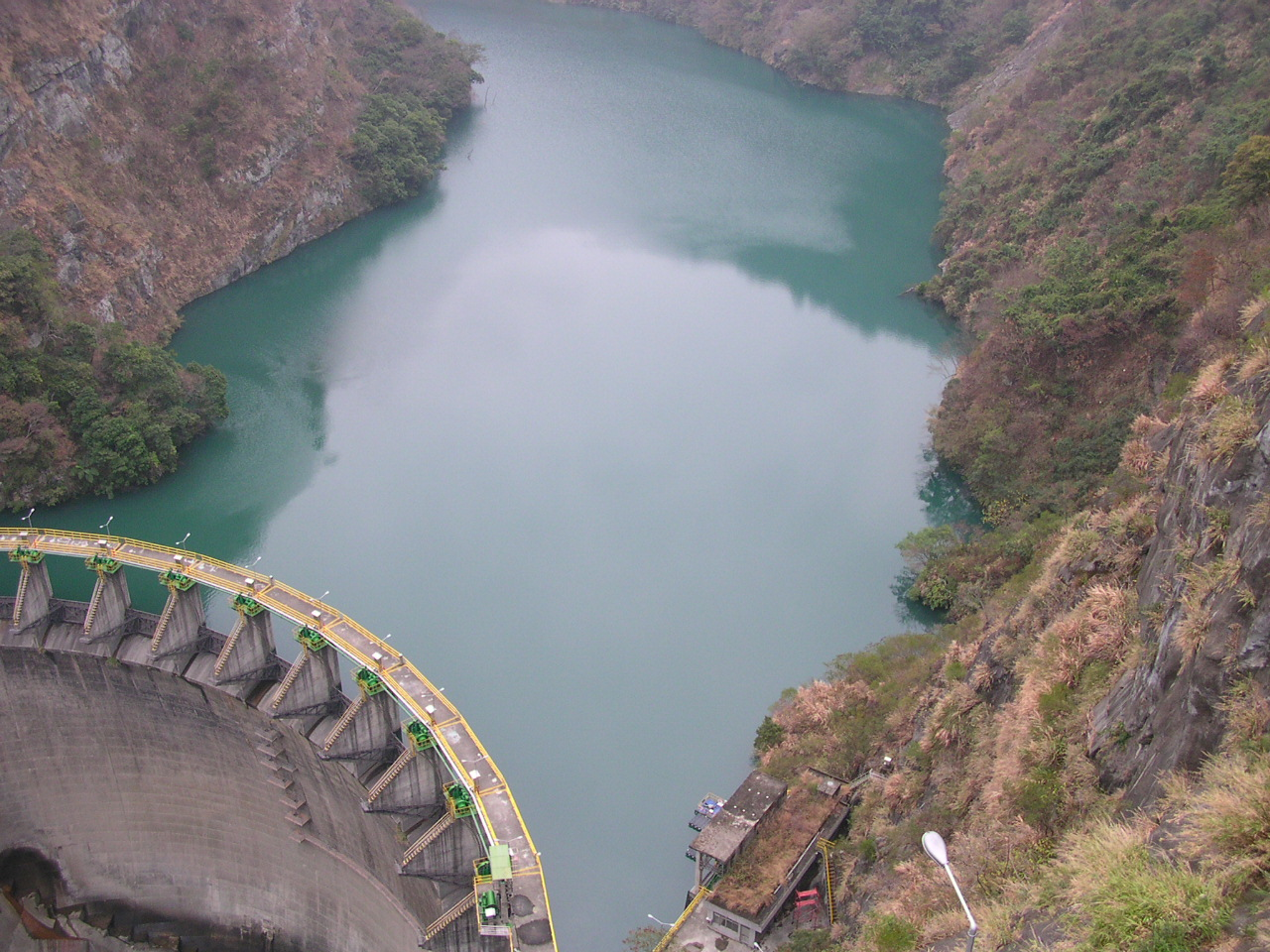
Junghua Power Plant

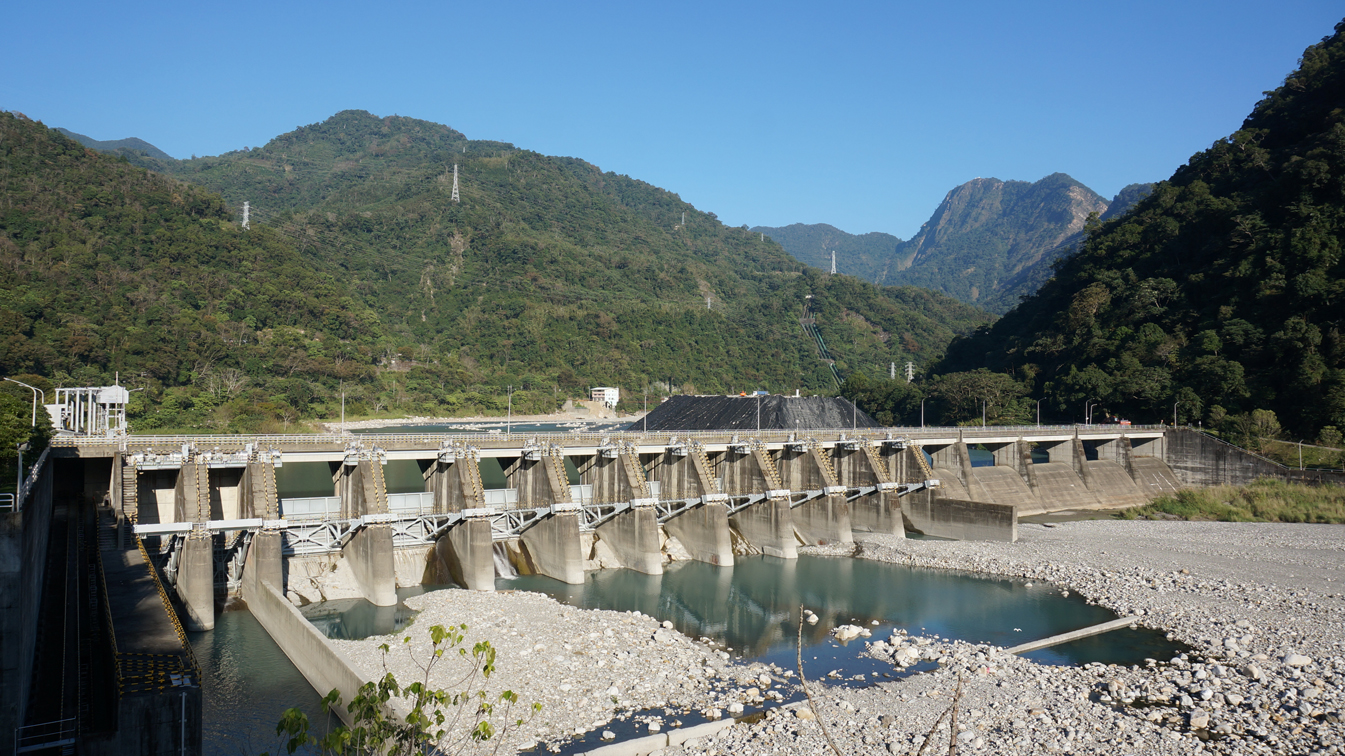
Ma'an Power Plant

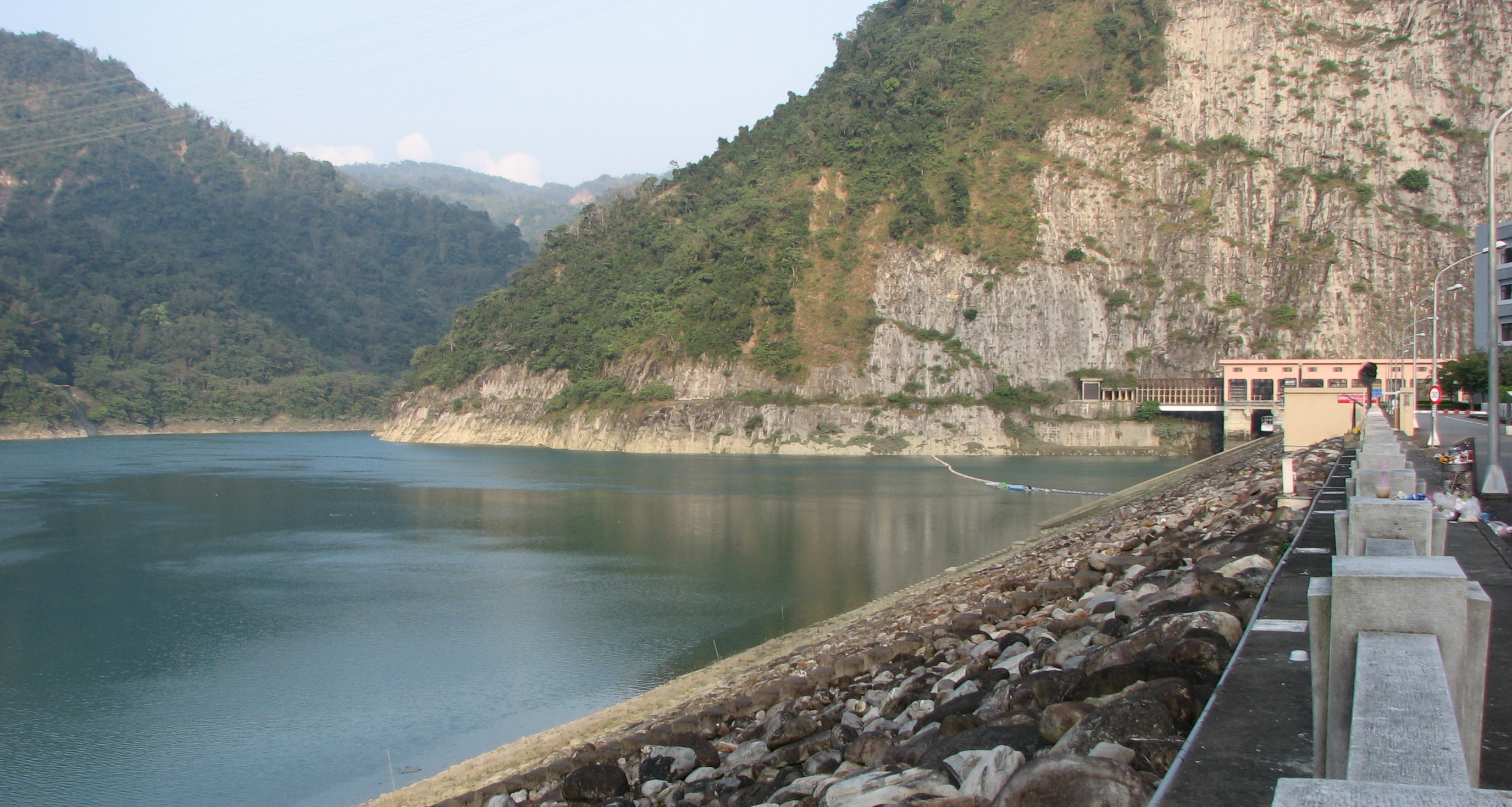
Mingtan Pumped Storage Hydro Power Plant

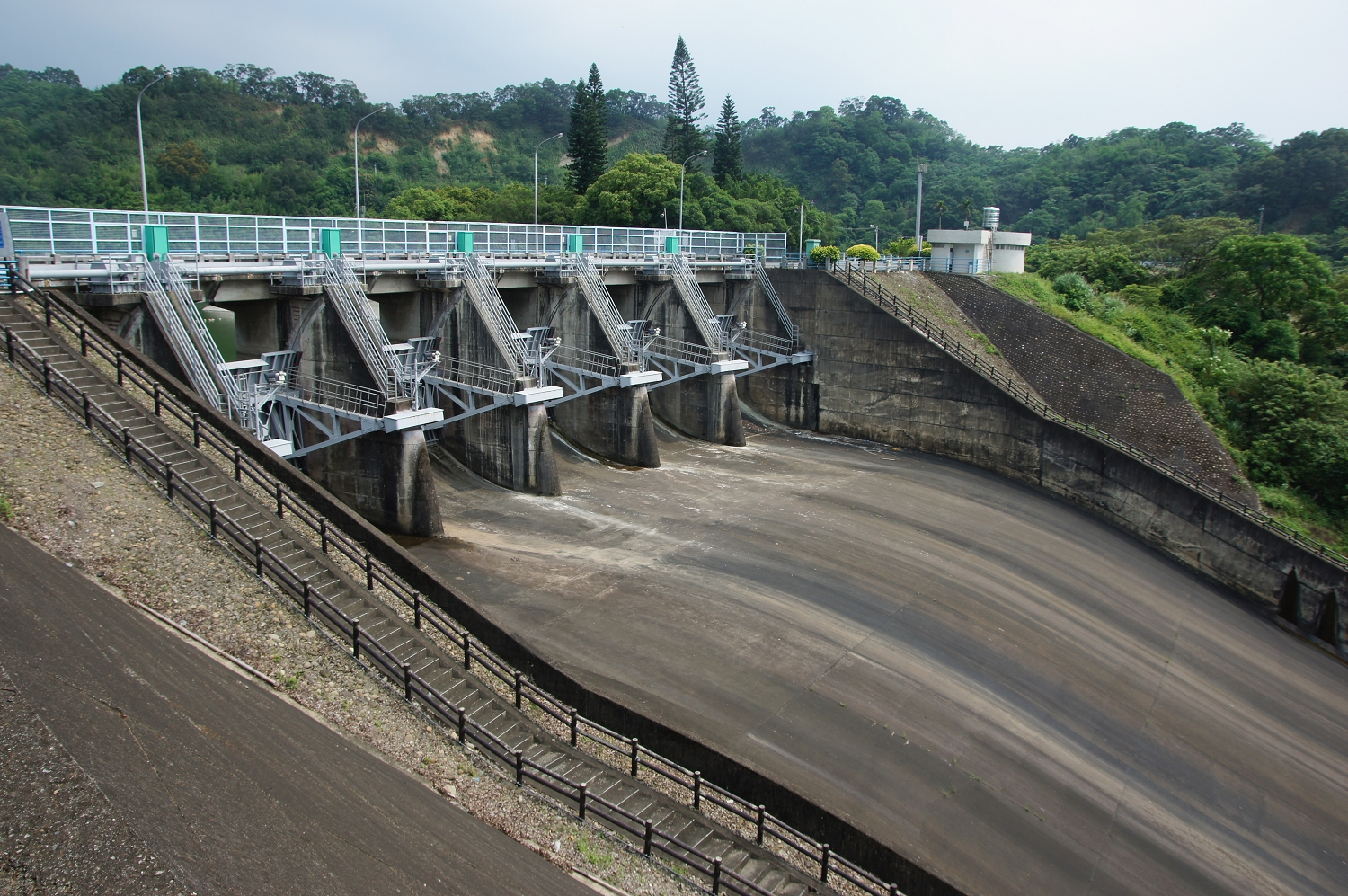
Mingte Power Plant

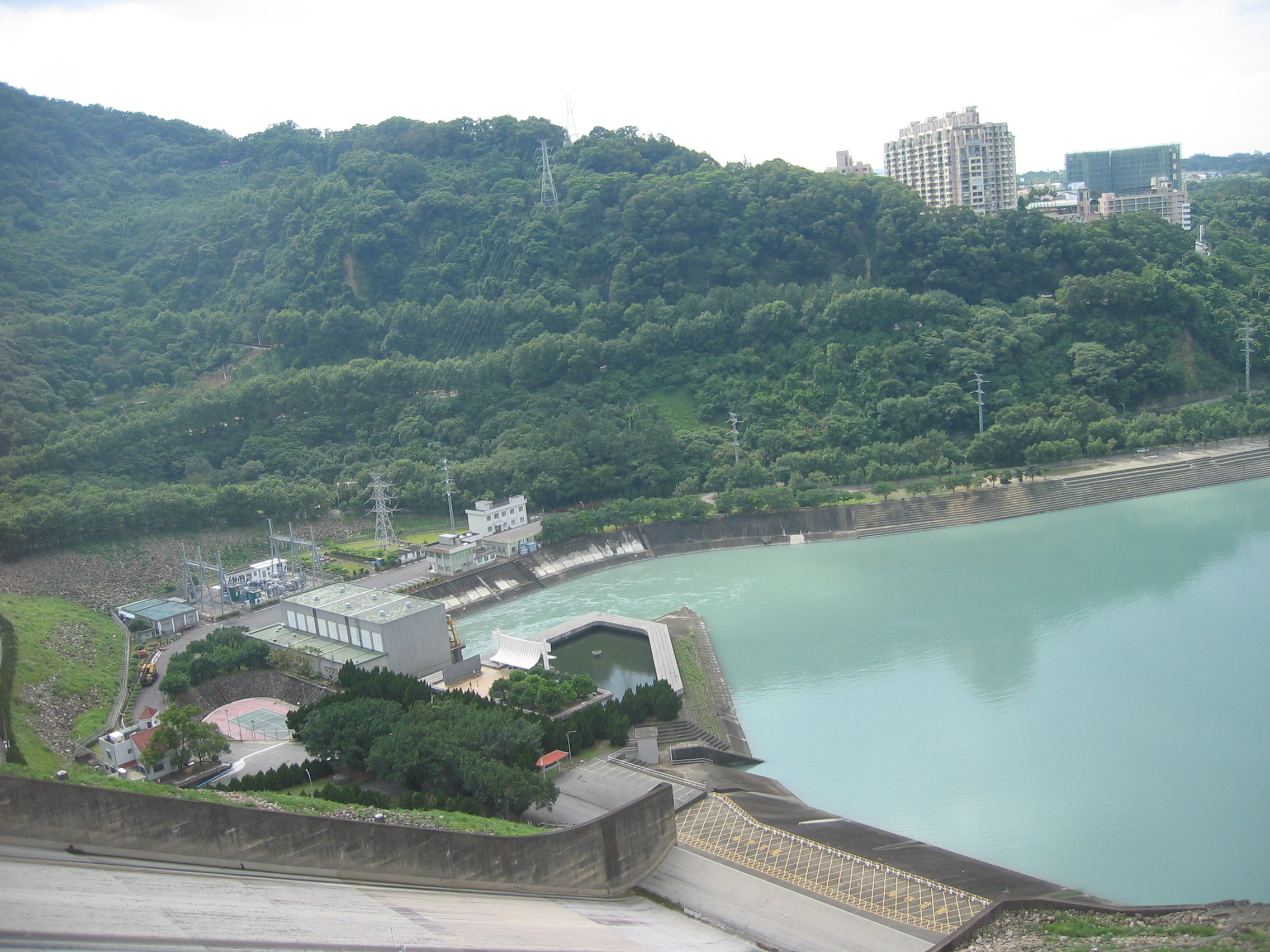
Shihmen Power Plant

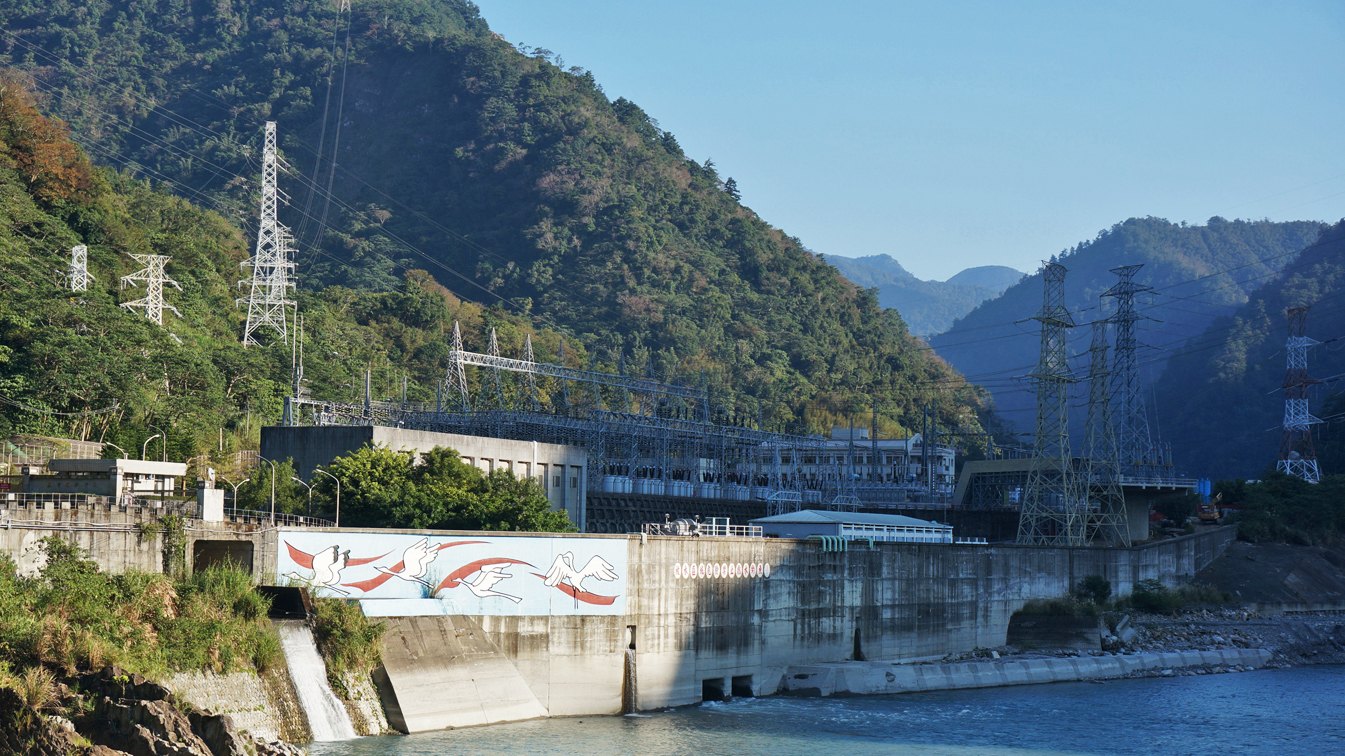
Tachia River Power Plant

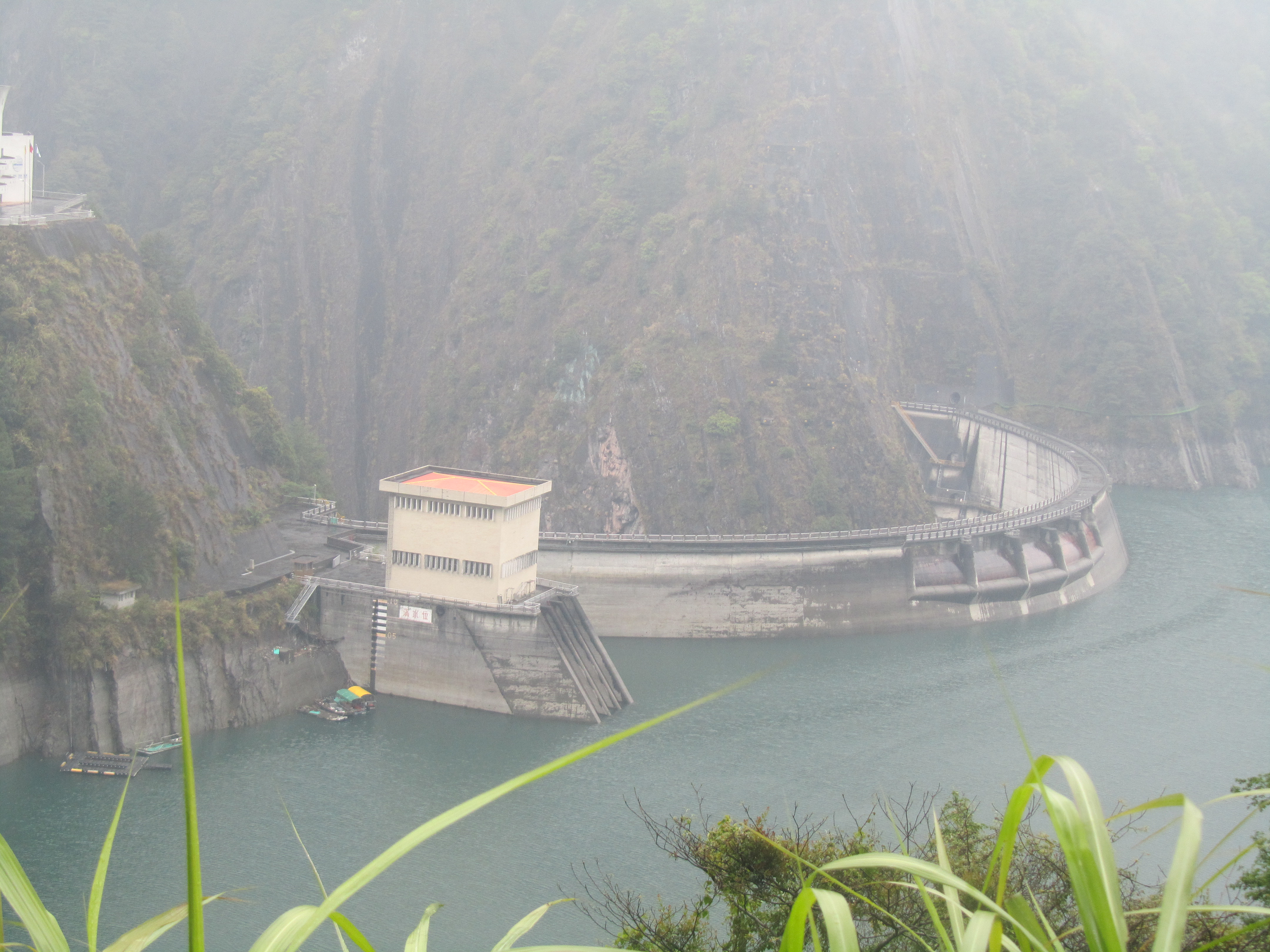
Teichi Power Plant

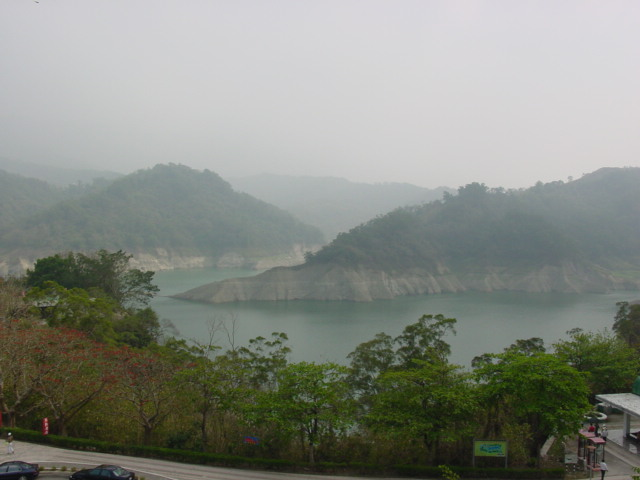
Zengwen Power Plant

=== Oil-fired power plants ===
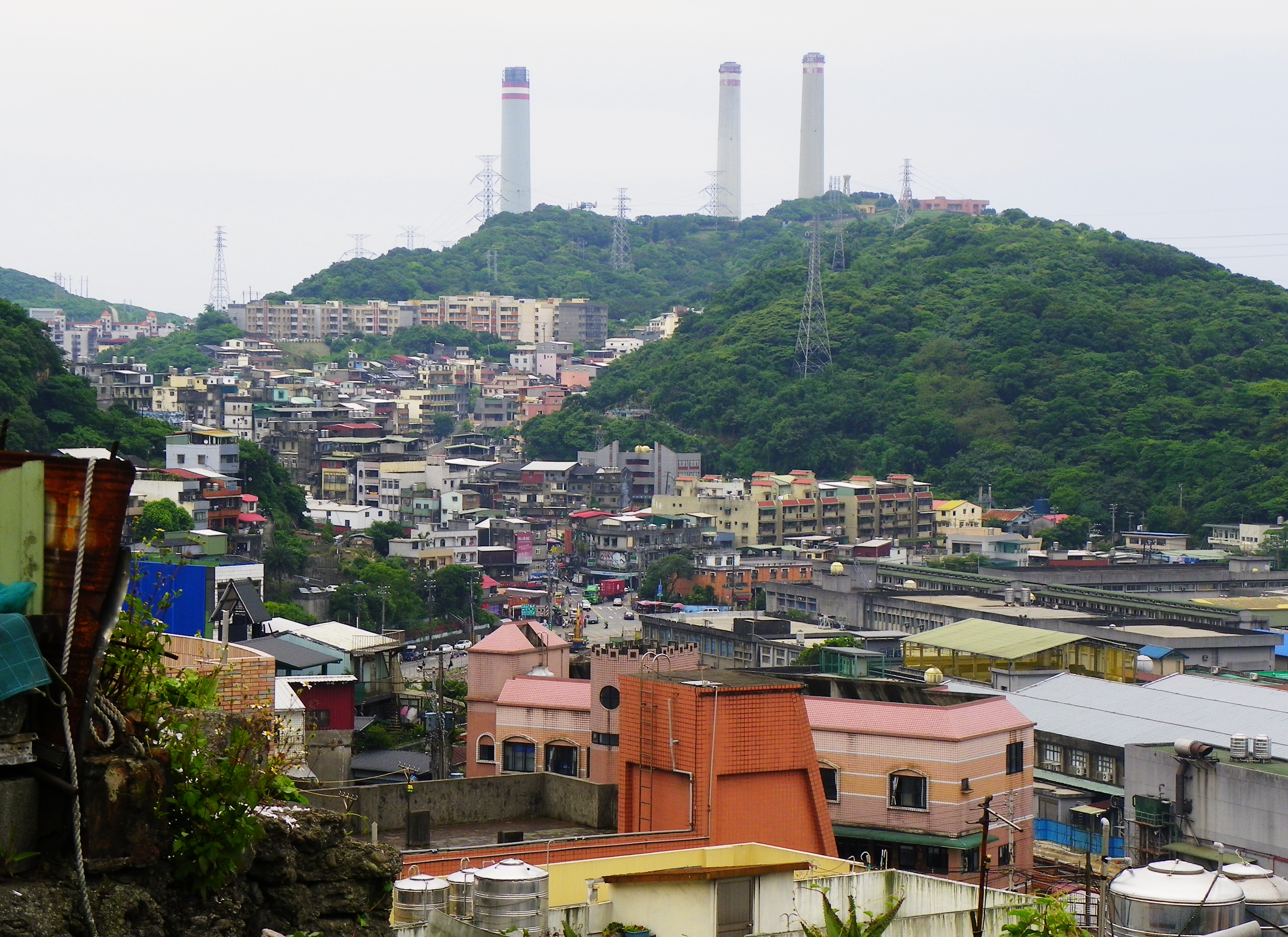
Hsieh-ho Power Plant

=== Former power plants ===
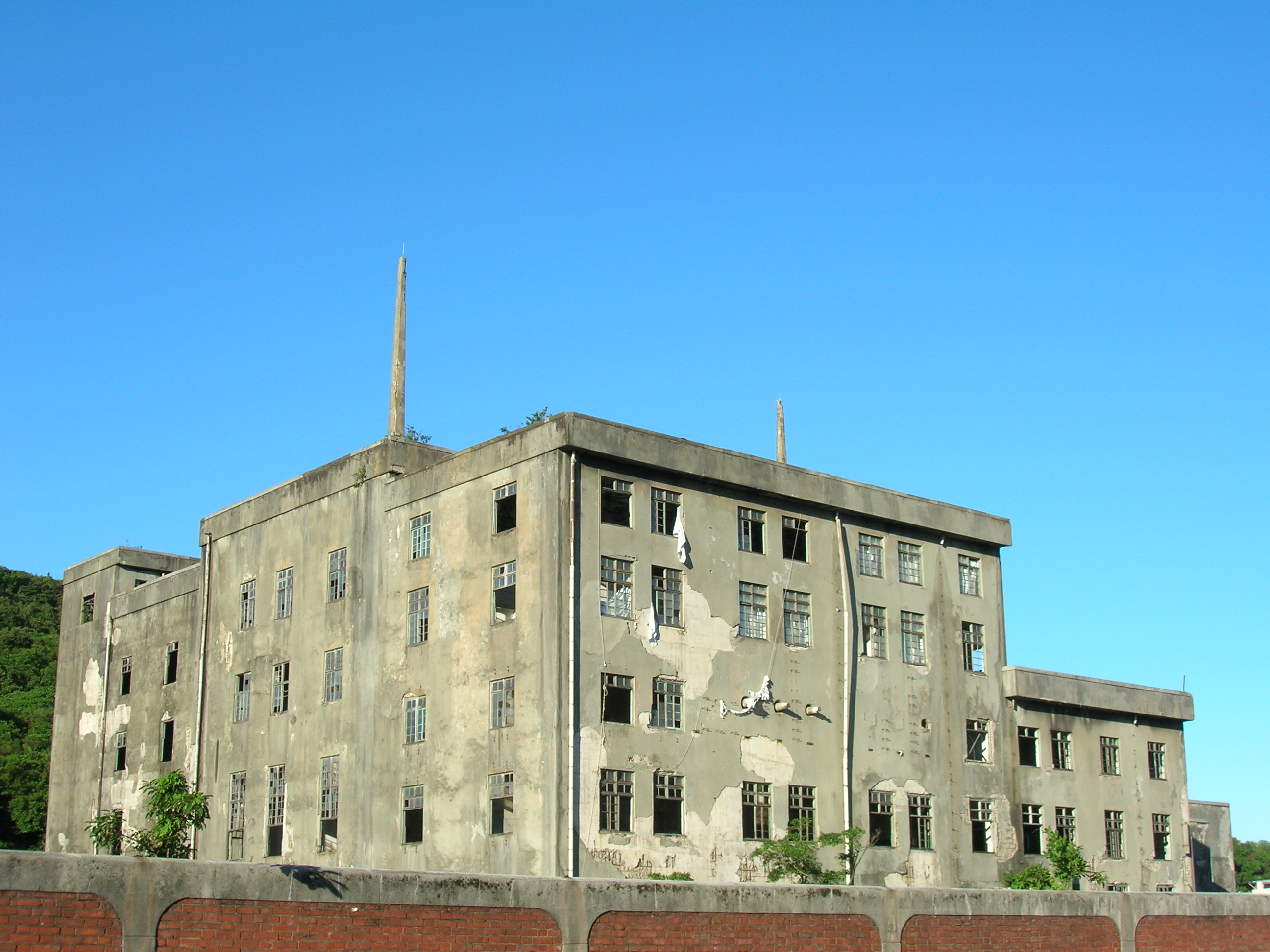
Beipu Power Plant

== See also ==
- Energy in Taiwan
- Taiwan Power Company
- Electricity sector in Taiwan
- List of largest power stations in the world
