= Dajia River =

River in Taichung, Taiwan

Coordinates: 24.3333°N 120.5564°E

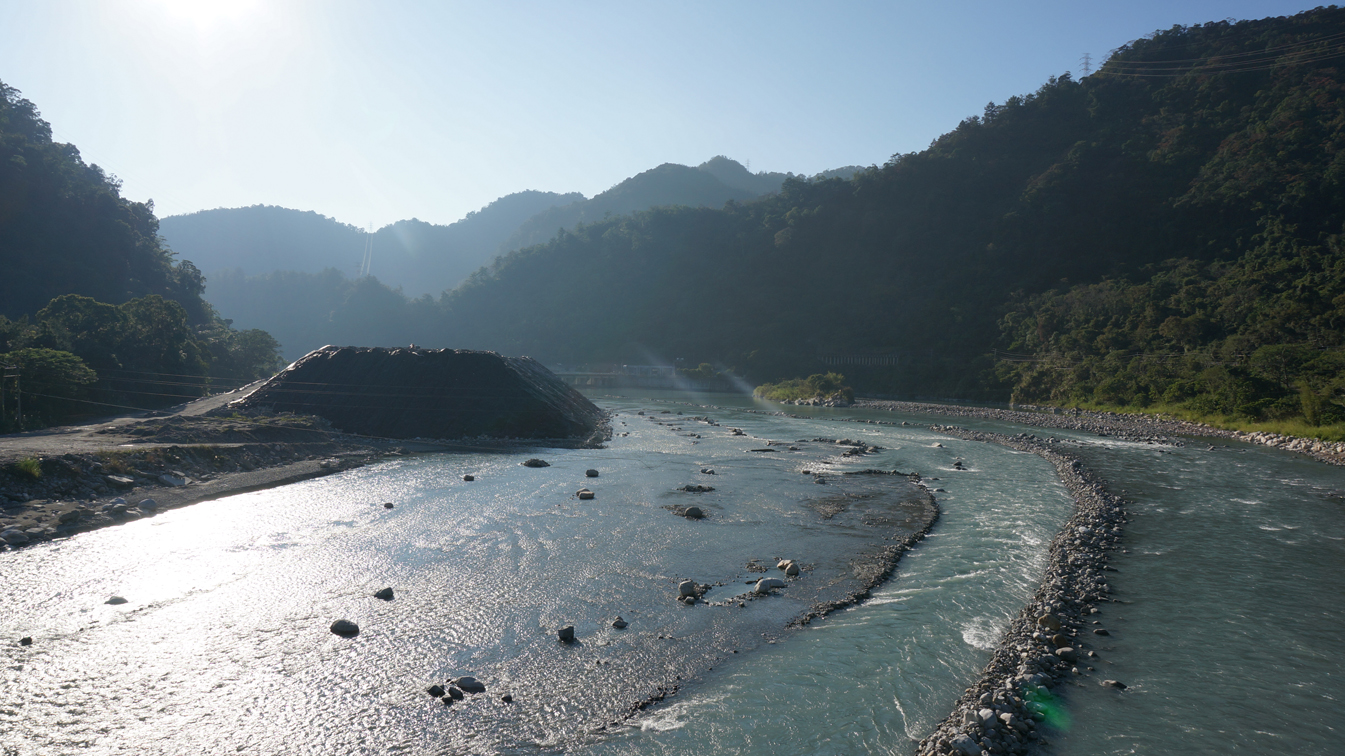
- Native name: 大甲溪 (Chinese)

Location
- Country: Taiwan

Physical characteristics
- Source
  - location: Nanhu Mountain
  - elevation: 3,637 metres (11,932 ft)
- Mouth
  - location: Taiwan Strait
- Length: 142 km (88 mi)
- Basin size: 1,235.73 km^{2} (477.12 sq mi)
- Discharge
  - average: 31 cubic metres per second (1,100 cu ft/s)

Dajia River (Chinese: 大甲溪; pinyin: Dàjiǎ Xī; Pe̍h-ōe-jī: Tāi-kah-khoe; lit. 'big shell river') is the fifth-longest river in Taiwan located in the north-central of the island. It flows through Taichung City for 142 km. The sources of the Dajia are: Hsuehshan and Nanhu Mountain in the Central Mountain Range. The Dajia River flows through the Taichung City districts of Heping, Xinshe, Dongshi, Shigang, Fengyuan, Houli, Shengang, Waipu, Dajia, Qingshui, and Da'an before emptying into the Taiwan Strait.

Taiwan's Central Cross-Island Highway runs along the Dajia River from Heping to Dongshih. The Taichung Beltway begins in Fongyuan and follows the Dajia through into Cingshuei.

The mountain streams of the upper Dajia River are the only habitats of the critically endangered landlocked Formosan salmon.

== Hydroelectricity ==
The Deji Reservoir (德基水庫; Déjī Shuǐkù; 'virtuous foundation reservoir'), formed by Techi Dam, is a 592-hectare reservoir in Dajia District. The reservoir provides municipal drinking water, generates hydroelectric power, is used for recreation and prevents flooding. Techi and a cascade of five other dams on the Dajia (in sequence from hill top, the Qingshan Dam, Kukuan Dam, Tienlun Dam, Ma'an Dam and Shigang Dam) produce up to 1,100 megawatts of hydroelectric power and generate more than 2.4 billion KWh per year.

== Incidents ==
The Dajia experiences frequent earthflows during typhoons and heavy rain, damaging homes and breaking up roads, sometimes permanently. In September 2008, rains from Typhoon Sinlaku resulted in storm-swollen waters which washed away supports for a section of Houfeng Bridge (which links Houli Township and Fengyuan City), leaving six people dead. In June 2010, the bridge finally reopened to vehicular traffic after over NT$1.4 billion of reconstruction work.

== See also ==
- List of rivers in Taiwan
- Taichung Aquarium
