= Shigang Dam =

Dam in Taichung, Taiwan

Coordinates: 24°16′58.3″N 120°46′08.3″E

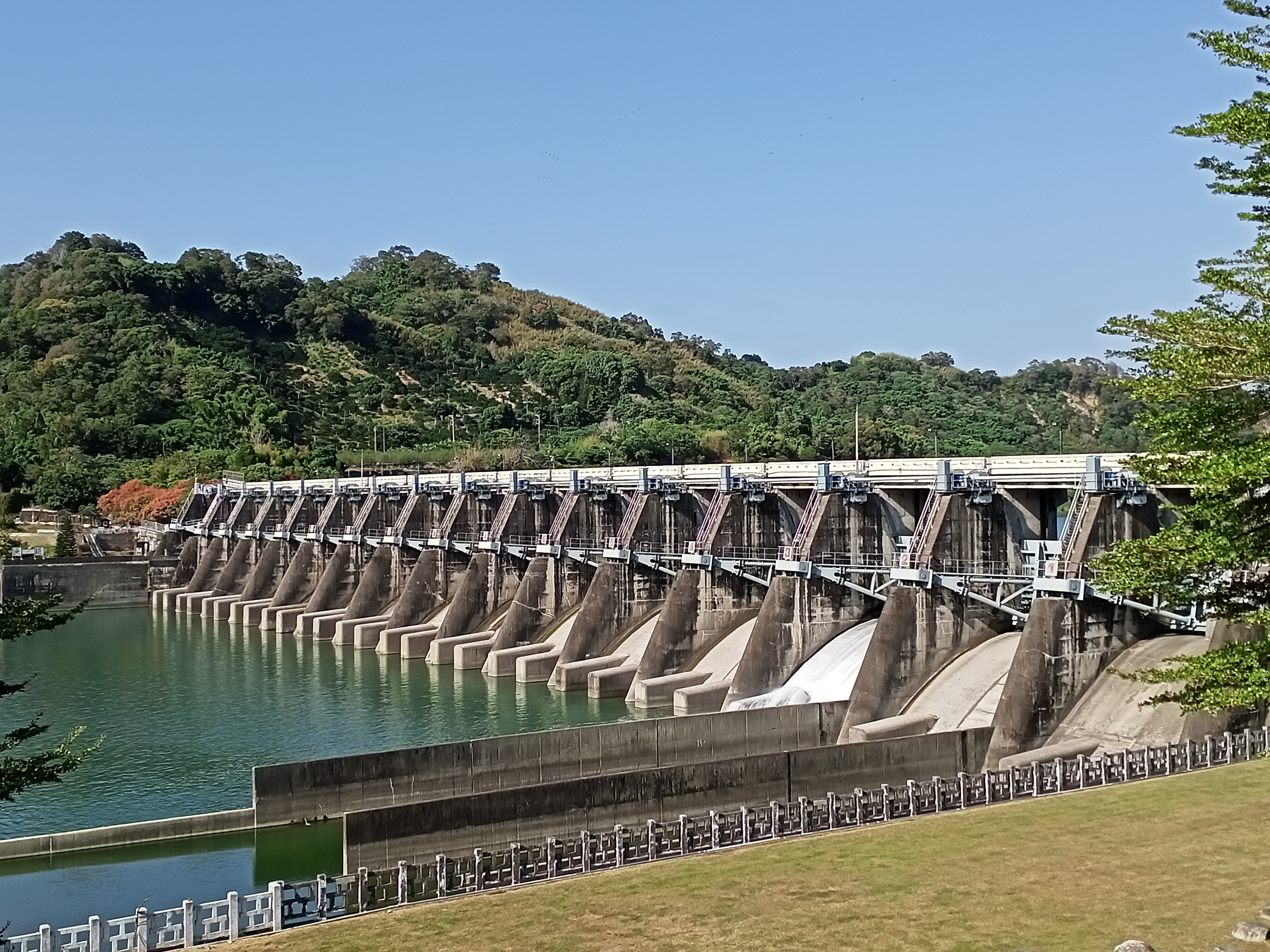
- Official name: 石岡壩
- Location: Shigang District / Dongshi District of Taichung, Taiwan
- Purpose: flood control, water storage, regulation, recreation
- Status: In use
- Construction began: 1974; 51 years ago
- Opening date: 1977; 48 years ago
- Operator(s): Ministry of Economic Affairs

Dam and spillways
- Type of dam: Gravity Dam
- Impounds: Dajia River
- Height: 25 m (82 ft)
- Length: 352 m (1,155 ft)
- Dam volume: 141,300 m^{3} (4,990,000 cu ft)
- Spillway type: 15 controlled drum-gate
- Spillway capacity: 13,000 m^{3}/s (460,000 cu ft/s)

Reservoir
- Total capacity: 3,380,000 m^{3} (119,000,000 cu ft)
- Active capacity: 1,430,000 m^{3} (50,000,000 cu ft)
- Catchment area: 1,061 km^{2} (410 sq mi)
- Surface area: 0.645 km^{2} (0.249 sq mi)
- Normal elevation: 267 ft (81 m)
- Website; Central Region Water Resources Office, Water Resources Agency, Ministry of Economic Affairs – SHIGANG DAM

Shigang Dam (traditional Chinese: 石岡壩; simplified Chinese: 石冈坝; pinyin: Shígāng Bà) is a concrete gravity barrage dam across the Dajia River in Shigang District and Dongshi District of Taichung, Taiwan, located near Fengyuan District. The dam was built from 1974 to 1977 for flood control and irrigation purposes, and stands 35.2 m (115 ft) high and 357 m (1,171 ft) long, holding a reservoir with an original capacity of 3,380,000 m^{3} (2,740 acre⋅ft).

The dam was badly damaged in the 921 earthquake of 1999, which caused the collapse of its northern end. Subsequently, an embankment cofferdam was built to prevent water from flowing through the breach, while the collapsed section has been retained as a memorial. Since this reduces the storage capacity of the dam, it is no longer used for flood control, but remains an important source of agricultural water.

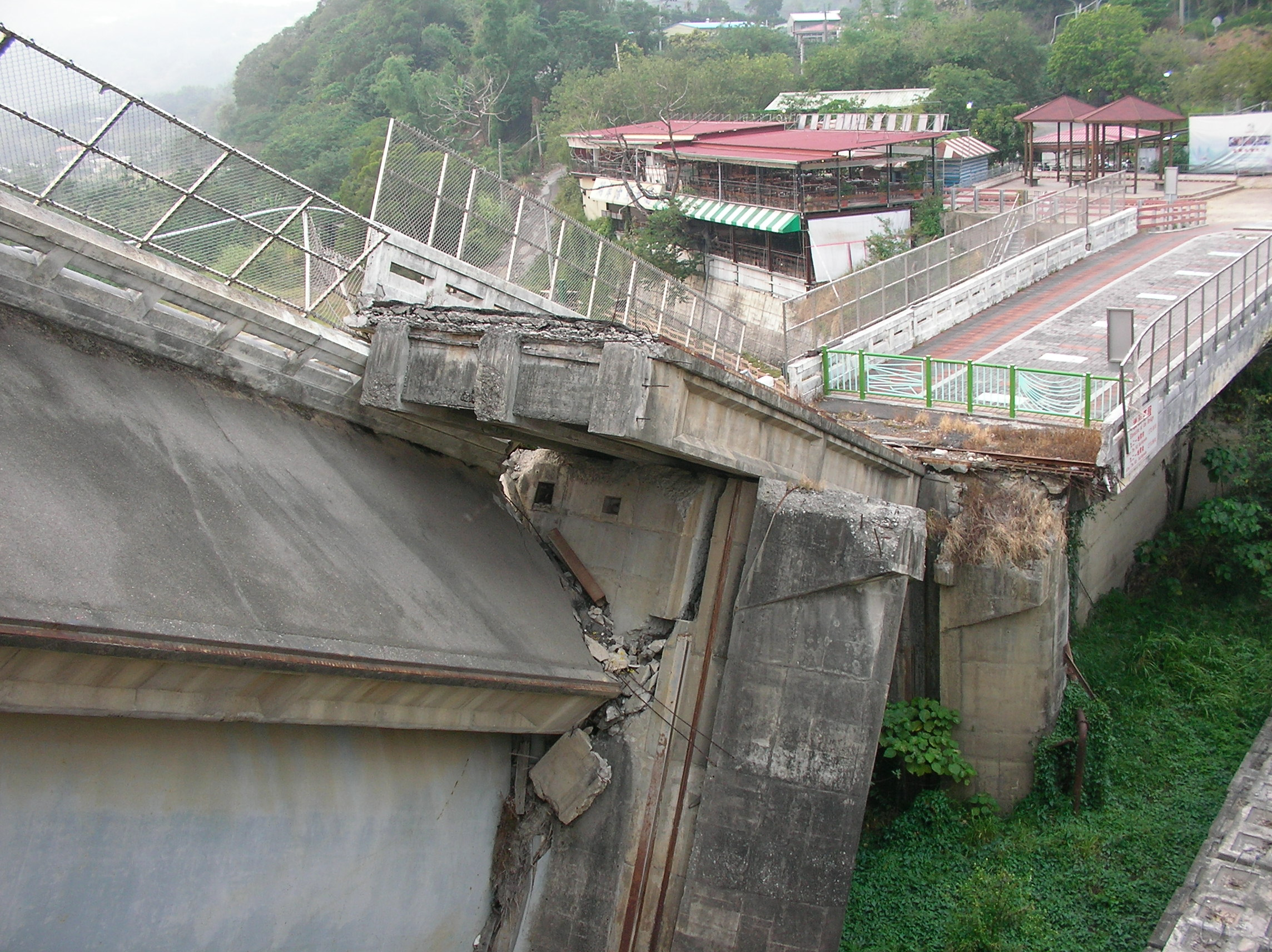
In 1999 destroyed part of the dam

== See also ==
- List of dams and reservoirs in Taiwan
