= Ma'an Dam =

Dam in Heping, Taichung, Taiwan

Ma'an Dam 馬鞍壩
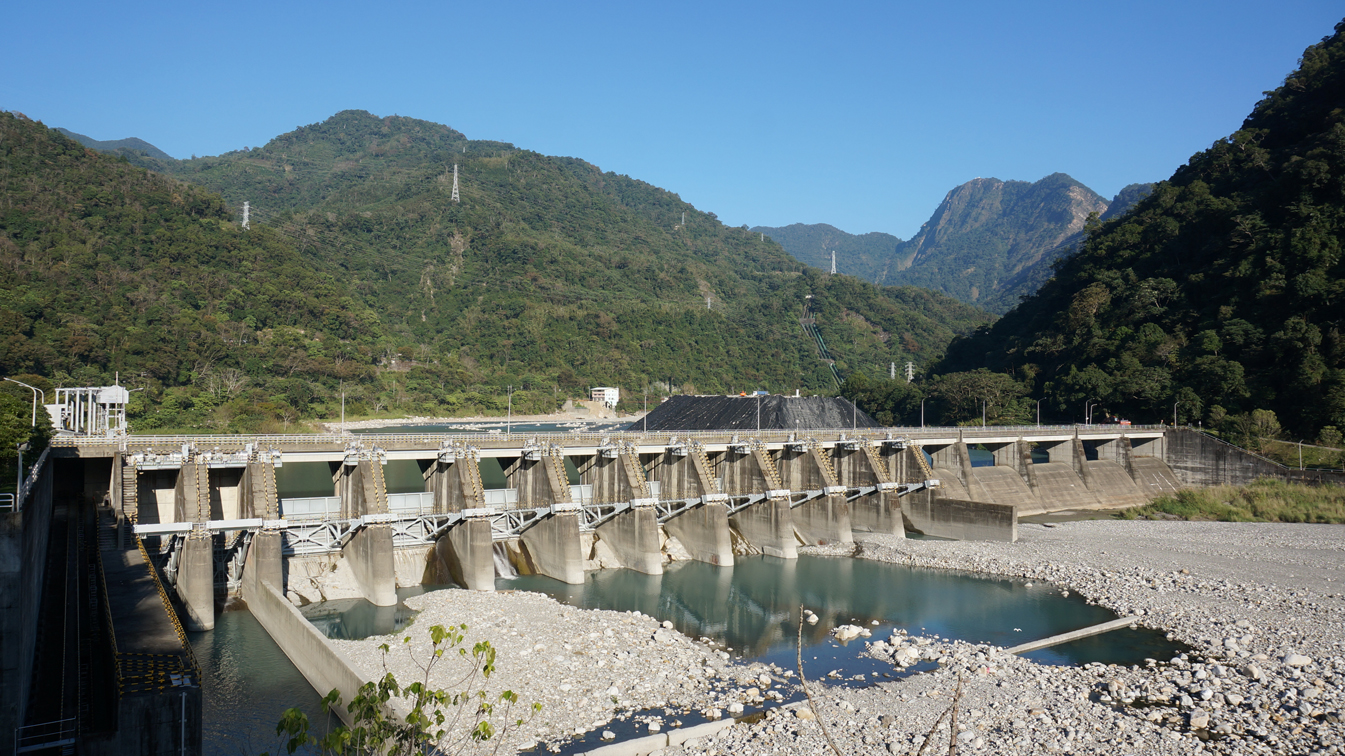

- Location within Taichung
- Location: Heping, Taichung, Taiwan
- Coordinates: 24°11′03″N 120°54′50″E
- Purpose: hydroelectricity
- Status: Operational
- Construction began: 1992; 34 years ago
- Opening date: 1998; 28 years ago

Dam and spillways
- Type of dam: concrete gravity barrage dam
- Impounds: Dajia River
- Height: 16.3 m (53 ft)
- Length: 229.5 m (753 ft)
- Spillways: 9
- Spillway capacity: 6,380 m^{3}/s (225,000 cu ft/s)

Reservoir
- Total capacity: 965,000 m^{3} (782 acre⋅ft)

Power Station
- Turbines: 2 X 66.735 MW
- Installed capacity: 133.47 MW
- Annual generation: 410.2 GWh

The Ma'an Dam (traditional Chinese: 馬鞍壩; simplified Chinese: 马鞍坝; pinyin: Mǎ'ān Bà, 'Saddle Dam') is a concrete gravity barrage dam on the Dajia River in Heping District, Taichung, Taiwan. The dam is the final stage of a cascade of hydroelectric power plants along the Dajia River and is located below the Tienlun Dam.

Built from 1992 to 1998, the dam is 16.3 m (53 ft) high and 229.5 m (753 ft) long, storing up to 965,000 m^{3} (782 acre⋅ft) in its reservoir. The service spillway of the dam consists of nine gates with a combined capacity of 6,380 m^{3}/s (225,000 cu ft/s).

The dam supplies water through a tunnel to a 133.47 MW power station near Xinshe with two 66.735 MW turbines, generating 410.2 million kilowatt hours per year.

== See also ==
- List of power stations in Taiwan
- List of dams and reservoirs in Taiwan
- Electricity sector in Taiwan
