= Tienlun Dam =

Dam in Heping, Taichung, Taiwan

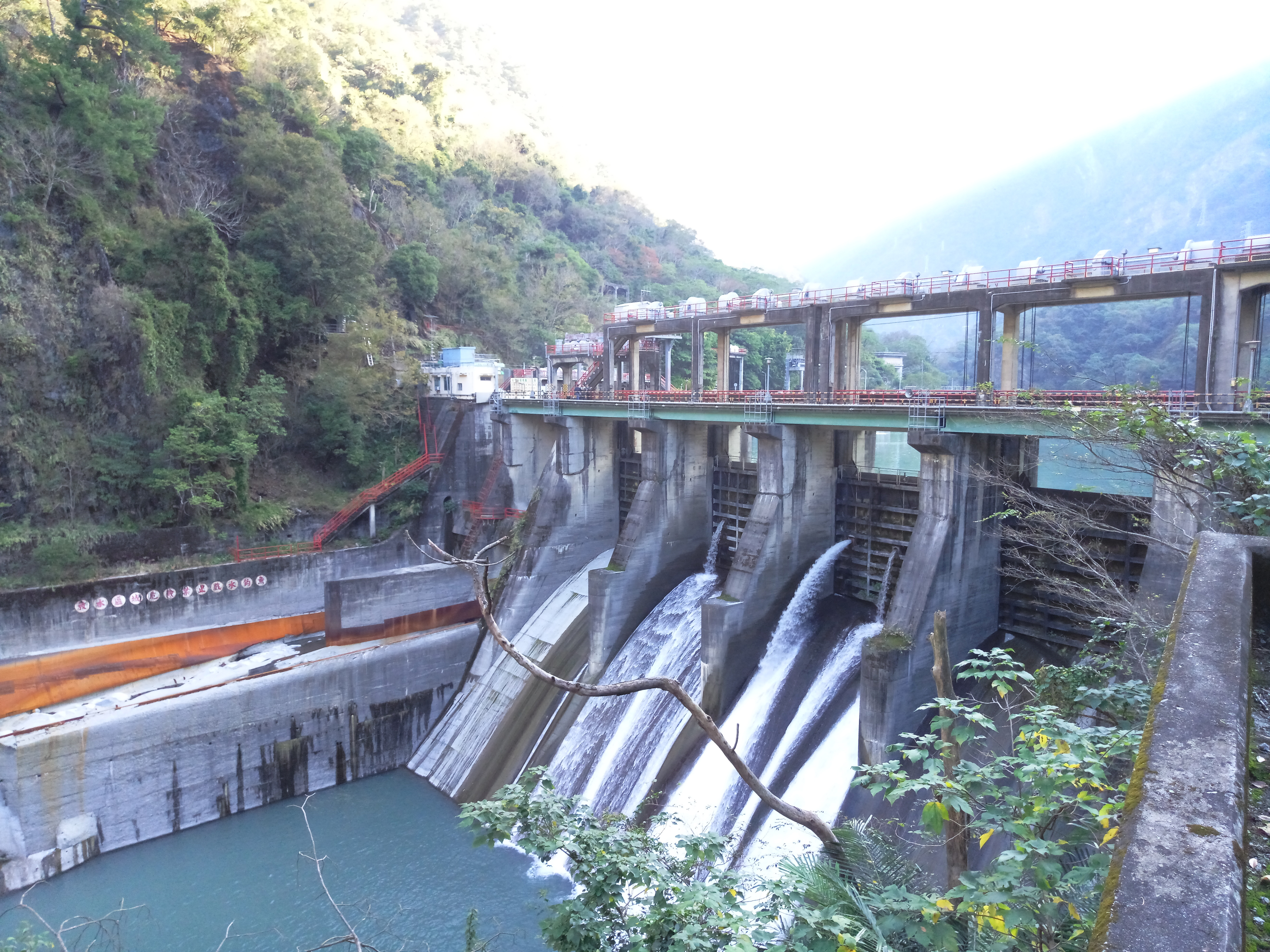
- Interactive map of Tienlun Dam
- Official name: 天輪壩
- Location: Heping, Taichung, Taiwan
- Coordinates: 24°12′38.44″N 121°00′56.9″E

Dam and spillways
- Impounds: Dajia River
- Length: 91 m (299 ft)

Reservoir
- Total capacity: 590,000 m^{3}

Power Station
- Turbines: 1 X 105 MW, 4 X 22.5 MW
- Installed capacity: 195 MW
- Annual generation: 557 GWh

Tienlun Dam (traditional Chinese: 天輪壩; simplified Chinese: 天轮坝; pinyin: Tiānlún Bà) is a concrete gravity dam on the Dajia River in Heping District, Taichung, Taiwan. Built from 1952 to 1956, the dam is the fourth in a cascade of hydroelectric dams along the Dajia River, located upstream from the Ma'an Dam and downstream of the Kukuan Dam.

The dam is 48.2 m (158 ft) high and 91 m (299 ft) long, with a storage capacity of 590,000 m^{3} (480 acre⋅ft) of water. It supplies water to a power station consisting of one 105 megawatt (MW) turbine and four 22.5 MW turbines for a capacity of 195 MW, generating 557 million kilowatt hours per year.

== See also ==
- List of power stations in Taiwan
- List of dams and reservoirs in Taiwan
- Electricity sector in Taiwan
