= Zengwen Dam =

Dam in Dapu, Chiyai County, Taiwan

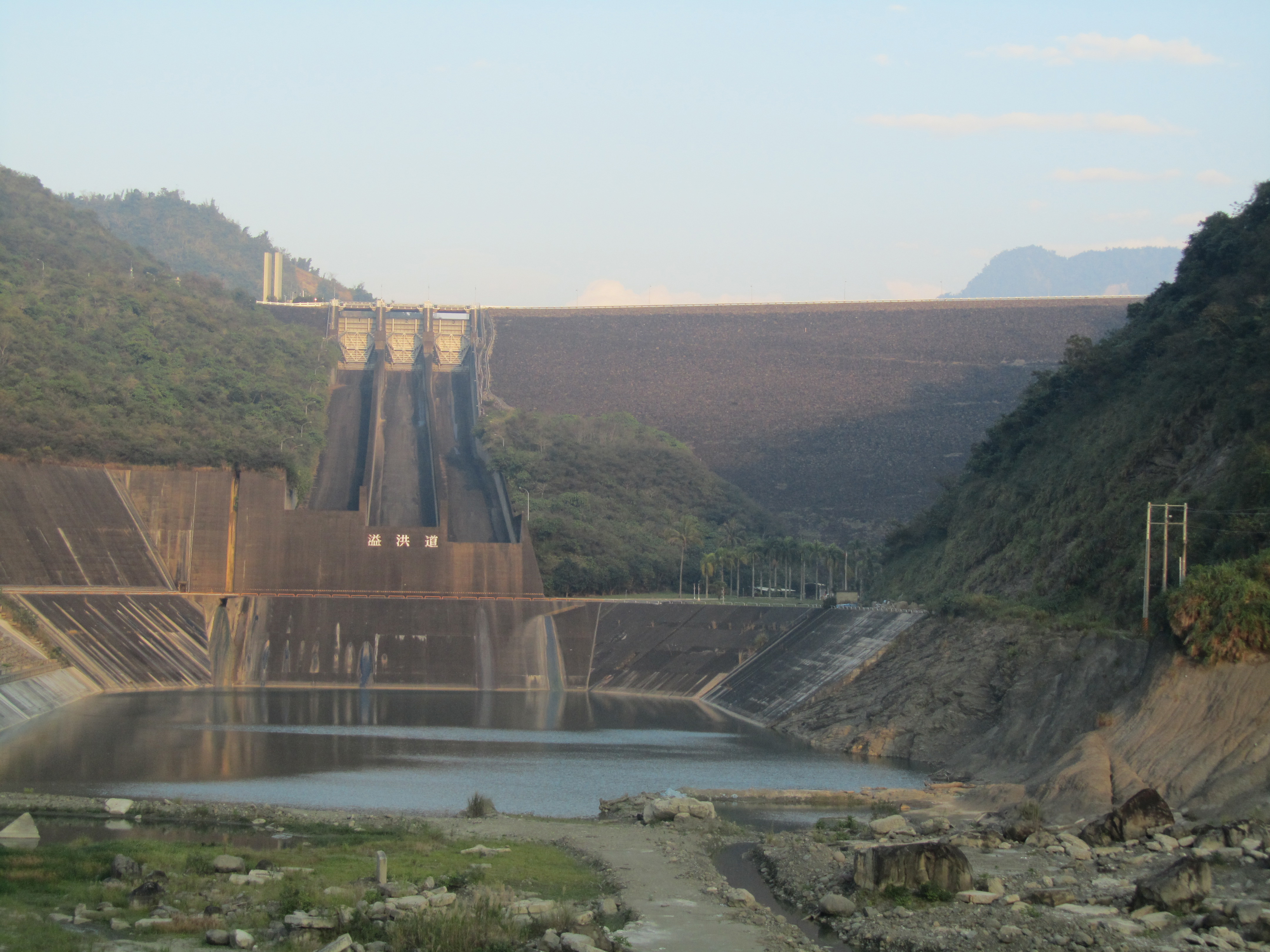

- Location within Chiayi County
- Official name: 曾文壩
- Location: Dapu, Chiayi County, Taiwan
- Coordinates: 23°14′53″N 120°32′11″E
- Status: In use
- Construction began: 1967; 59 years ago
- Opening date: 1973; 53 years ago

Dam and spillways
- Type of dam: Earthfill
- Impounds: Zengwen River
- Height: 128 m (420 ft)
- Length: 400 m (1,300 ft)
- Width (crest): 10 m (33 ft)
- Width (base): 445 m (1,460 ft)
- Spillways: 3
- Spillway type: Gated overflow, service
- Spillway capacity: 9,470 m^{3}/s (334,000 cu ft/s)

Reservoir
- Creates: Zengwen Reservoir
- Total capacity: 708,000,000 m^{3} (574,000 acre⋅ft) (nominal); 491,590,000 m^{3} (398,540 acre⋅ft) (2013 estimate)
- Catchment area: 481 km^{2} (186 mi^{2})
- Surface area: 17 km^{2} (4,200 acres)

Power Station
- Installed capacity: 50 MW
- Annual generation: 184,900,320 KWh

Zengwen Dam, also spelled Tsengwen Dam, (Chinese: 曾文壩; Hanyu Pinyin: Zéngwén Bà; Tongyong Pinyin: Zéngwún Shuěibà; Wade–Giles: Tseng^{2}-wen^{2} Shui^{3}-b'a^{4}) is a major earthen dam in Dapu Township, Chiayi County, Taiwan on the Zengwen River. It is the third tallest dam in Taiwan, and forms Zengwen Reservoir (曾文水庫), the biggest reservoir in Taiwan by volume. The dam stores water for irrigation of the Chianan Plain, Taiwan's most productive agricultural region, and provides flood control along the Zengwen River which flows through Tainan City. The dam supports a 50 megawatt hydroelectric power station.

== History ==
=== Chianan irrigation project ===
The first proposals for the dam were made as early as the 1930s during the Japanese occupation of Taiwan. The Japanese built the Chianan Irrigation system to increase Taiwan's agricultural output, which was supplied primarily by the Zengwen River. Because the Zengwen River does not cross the area of the Chianan Plain to be irrigated, a tunnel was punched through mountains to divert Zengwen water into the Guantian River. Between 1920 and 1930, the Wushantou Dam was built, forming an impoundment of the Guantian River to store 154,160,000 cubic metres (124,980 acre⋅ft) of water for seasonal use. At the time of completion, it was the largest dam in Taiwan. Also built was the Tungkou Weir on the Zengwen River, a 220.8-metre (724 ft) long structure designed to divert the water into the Guantian tunnel. The system irrigates about 150,000 hectares (370,000 acres) of land which otherwise does not receive enough consistent rainfall to grow crops such as rice.

=== Initial proposal ===
Due to Taiwan's highly seasonal rainfall, the Zengwen River contains little water except during the wet season from May to October, during which massive floods occur that exceed the capacity of the diversion tunnel. Out of the average 1.6 cubic kilometres (1,300,000 acre⋅ft) annual flow of the Zengwen River, only 25 percent of the water could be effectively used. Furthermore, the Zengwen river has a high silt content, which was causing the Wushantou reservoir to quickly lose its capacity. In 1939, Japanese engineer Hatta Yoichi proposed the construction of a concrete gravity dam at a place called Lioutengtan, to control the floods and block silt, but these plans were dropped due to the intervention of World War II.

=== River diversion ===
Construction finally began at the Lioutengtan site on October 31, 1967. Two tunnels were excavated through the rock underneath the south abutment of the future dam site. The outer diversion tunnel was 1,240-metre (4,070 ft) long and the inner diversion tunnel was 1,038-metre (3,406 ft). A rolled-earth embankment cofferdam was constructed to divert the Zengwen River and protect the dam site from flooding, up to an elevation of 165 metres (541 ft).

=== Dam and spillways ===
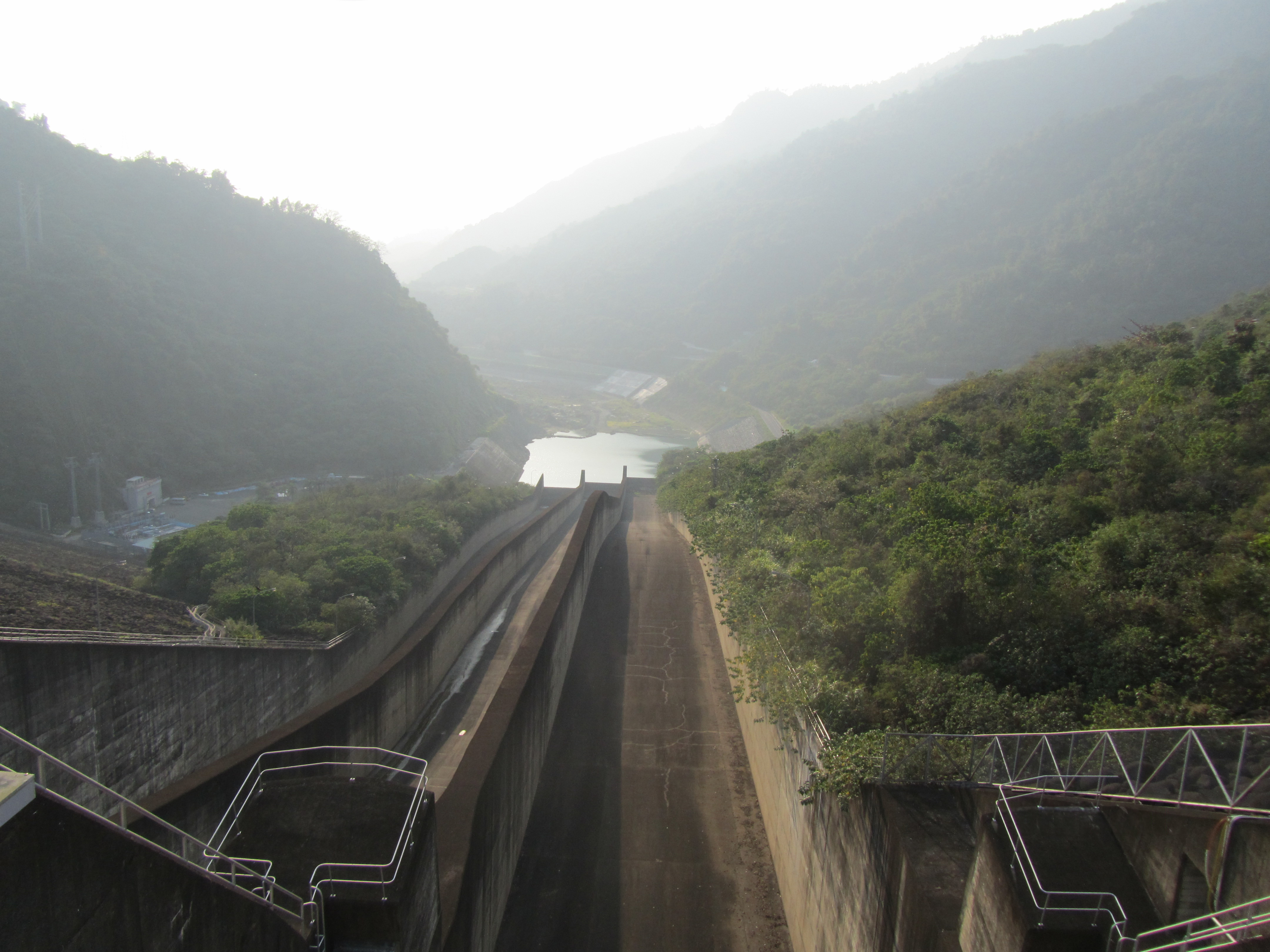
Spillway channel with Zengwen River downstream

After the river had been diverted, the foundation could be excavated down to bedrock and drained. Construction of the dam could not begin until several faults in the bedrock had been stabilized and treated with concrete and grout. Construction of the main embankment using the hydraulic fill method began on 31 October 1970 and continued until 21 April 1973. The Zengwen Dam is 128 metres (420 ft) high, 400 metres (1,300 ft) long and 445 metres (1,460 ft) thick at the base, and contains 9,296,100 cubic metres (328,290,000 ft^{3}) of material. The dam was constructed using material from the spillway and foundation excavations, as well as the river bed upstream where the reservoir would be formed.

The concrete spillway was constructed to the north (right bank) of the dam and consists of a multi-level open channel controlled by three radial gates. Due to a large volume of unstable sandstone, clay and shale that comprised the slope where the spillway was to be built, about 6,040,000 cubic metres (213,000,000 ft^{3}) of material had to be removed before concrete placement could begin. Construction of the spillway was carried out simultaneously with the main dam. The spillway can discharge up to 9,470 cubic metres per second (334,000 cu ft/s) when all the gates are open. The dam is also equipped with two sluice gates for de-silting operations, and two flood outlet tunnels with 160 cubic metres per second (5,700 cu ft/s) capacity.

The entire project consisting of dam, spillway, and power station was formally completed and dedicated on October 31, 1973, exactly six years after the beginning of construction. The total cost of construction was US$97,373,000.

=== Power station ===
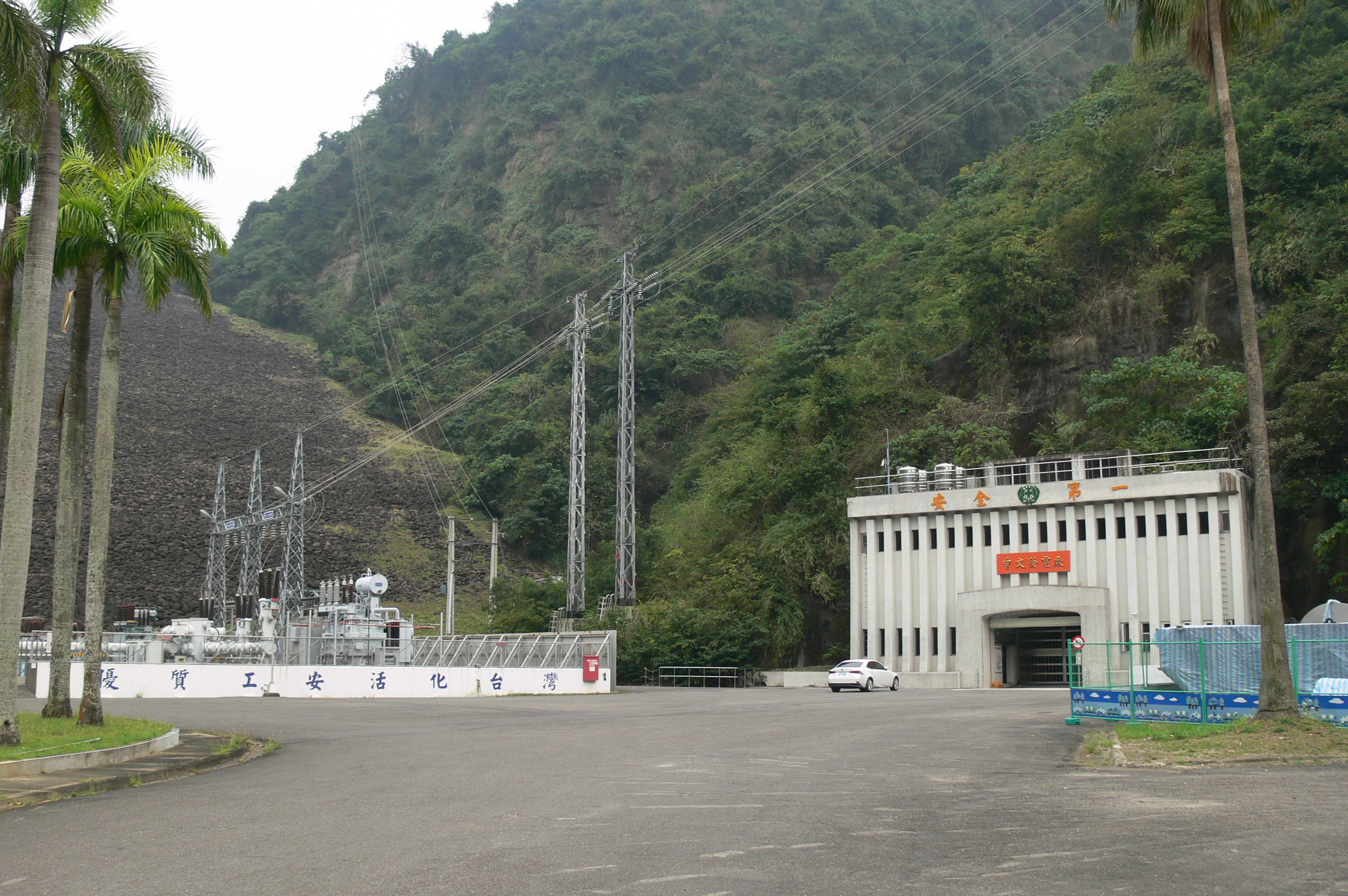
Zengwen Power Plant

The Zengwen hydroelectric power station was constructed underground in the south (left bank) of the dam and required the excavation of 16,800 cubic metres (590,000 ft^{3}) of earth and rock, and 7,300 cubic metres (260,000 ft^{3}) of concrete treatment. The facilities were constructed using the cut and cover method. The 389-metre (1,276 ft) Tongda tunnel was built to allow workers and equipment to access the plant after it had been completed. The power station's single 50,000 kilowatt generator first came online in October 1973. The average annual power generation is 184,900,320 kilowatt hours. Because dam releases are determined by irrigation and domestic water supply needs, power generation is secondary (incidental) and does not always correspond to demand on the grid.

Due to the large elevation difference between Zengwen Dam and the head of Wushantou reservoir, further development of run-of-the-river hydropower plants below the dam may be feasible. An 11,500 kilowatt facility is proposed, which would generate up to 49 million kilowatt hours annually.

=== Reservoir ===
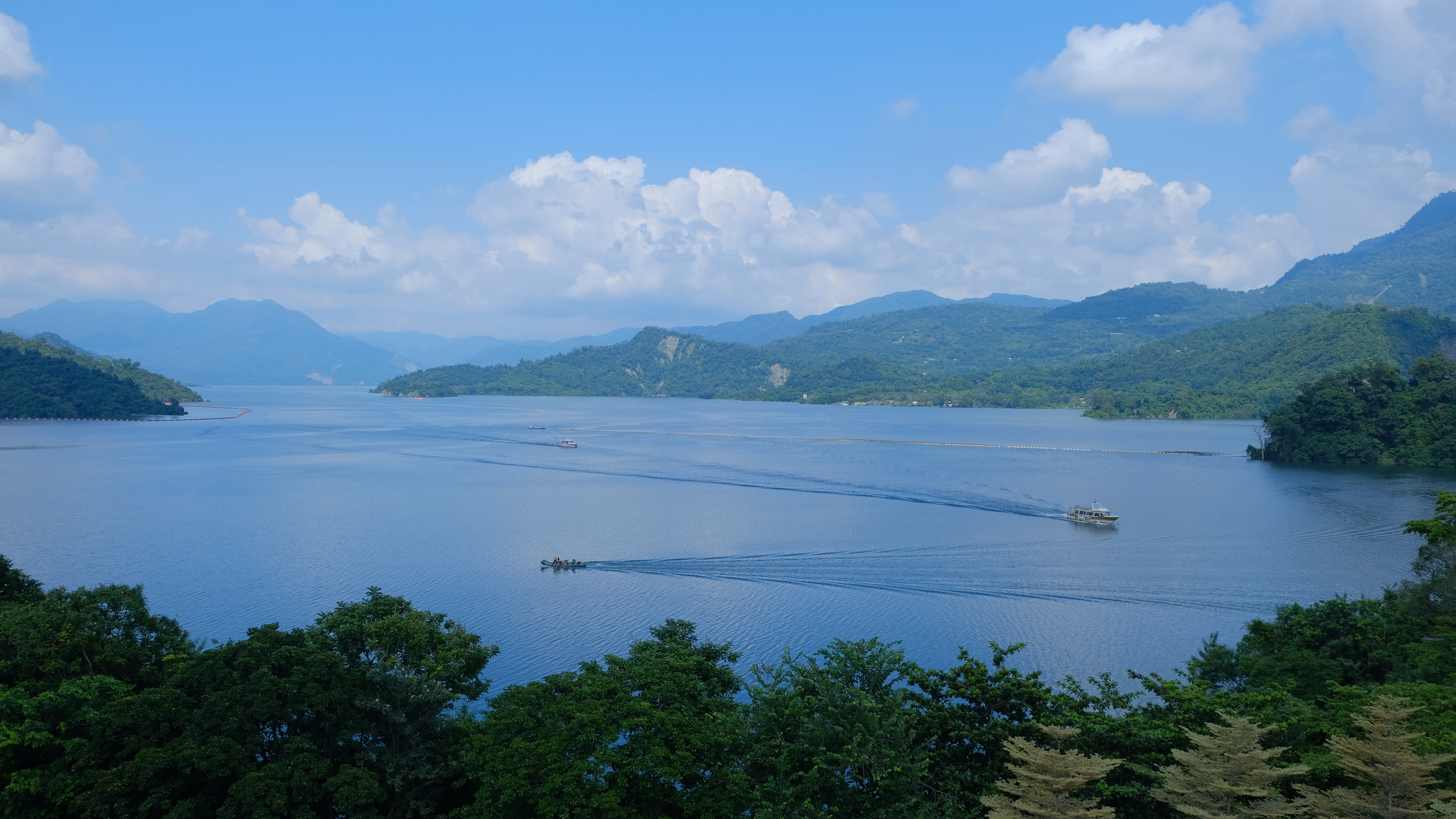
Zengwen Reservoir

On March 2, 1973 with construction on the dam 96 percent complete, the first diversion tunnel was plugged; on April 28, 1973, the second tunnel was blocked, allowing the reservoir to begin storing water. The filling was approximately five months ahead of schedule, enabling water to be stored for the 1973 irrigation season rather than beginning in 1974 as originally planned. The Zengwen reservoir is the largest lake in Taiwan, with an initial design capacity of 708,000,000 cubic metres (574,000 acre⋅ft), and a surface area of 1,700 hectares (4,200 acres) when full, more than twice that of Sun Moon Lake. The full water level is 227 metres (745 ft) above sea level.

Although the main purpose of the Zengwen reservoir is irrigation, it is also operated for flood control during the typhoon season. If the Central Weather Bureau issues a typhoon warning, and the reservoir level is higher than the flood-control pool, the gates may be opened to drain the extra water ahead of time, to reduce the risk of a sudden uncontrolled overflow that might endanger lives and property downstream.

The reservoir has allowed an increase of 270,000,000 cubic metres (220,000 acre⋅ft) of water per year for irrigation and industry, and another 120,000,000 cubic metres (97,000 acre⋅ft) of drinking water. This makes possible the irrigation of an additional 66,000 hectares (160,000 acres) of land, while improving the reliability of supply for already existing farmland. It also allows for boats to access remote villages in Dapu township, which prior to the dam's construction could only be reached by winding mountain roads.

The Zengwen Reservoir Management Bureau was established on January 1, 1974 to coordinate operations of the dam and reservoir. On January 23, 1998 the bureau was combined with other reservoir administrations in southern Taiwan, to form the Southern Region Water Resources Office.

== Watershed and environmental issues ==
The Zengwen reservoir receives its water from an extremely steep and rugged catchment basin of 481-square-kilometre (186 mi^{2}) in the Alishan Range of south-central Taiwan. The elevation of the land ranges from 227 metres (745 ft) on the shore of the reservoir to over 2,500 metres (8,200 ft) in the Alishan National Scenic Area near the summit of the range. About 77 percent of the watershed is forest, 13 percent is agriculture, 9 percent other uses and less than 1 percent is urbanized. The reservoir has suffered severe siltation (sedimentation) from the watershed, which has caused a large reduction in its capacity.

Siltation has reduced the volume of water available for irrigation and hydropower, as well as reducing the effectiveness of the Zengwen reservoir to control flooding. The siltation rate has greatly increased in recent years, in part due to a sharp increase in the intensity of typhoon rains, as well as a rising frequency of drought. In August 2009, Typhoon Morakot caused massive flooding and mudflows which carried 91,000,000 cubic metres (74,000 acre⋅ft) of sediment into the reservoir, almost instantly wiping out 13 percent of its capacity. In June 2013, the Zengwen Reservoir capacity was estimated at 491,590,000 cubic metres (398,540 acre⋅ft), about 69 percent of its original volume.

Due to lack of funding, dredging operations in the Zengwen reservoir have been limited, and the effective storage capacity has continued to decrease. However, after Typhoon Morakot the Taiwanese government approved a NT$54 billion project to remove silt and conduct watershed restoration work at Zengwen, Wushantou and Nanhua reservoirs.

In January 2018, a 1,260-metre (4,130 ft) long sluicing tunnel began operation at the base of the dam, allowing sediment from the bottom of the reservoir to be moved downstream. The project was constructed from March 2013 to November 2017 and cost NT$4.1 billion. It is expected to remove 1.04 billion tonnes of sediment each year.

== Recreation ==
The Zengwen dam and reservoir are part of the Zengwen Reservoir Scenic Area. The reservoir was first opened to the public in July 1974.

== See also ==
- List of dams and reservoirs in Taiwan
- List of power stations in Taiwan
- Nanhua Dam
- Wushantou Dam
- Electricity sector in Taiwan
