= Wushantou Dam =

Wushantou Dam 烏山頭壩
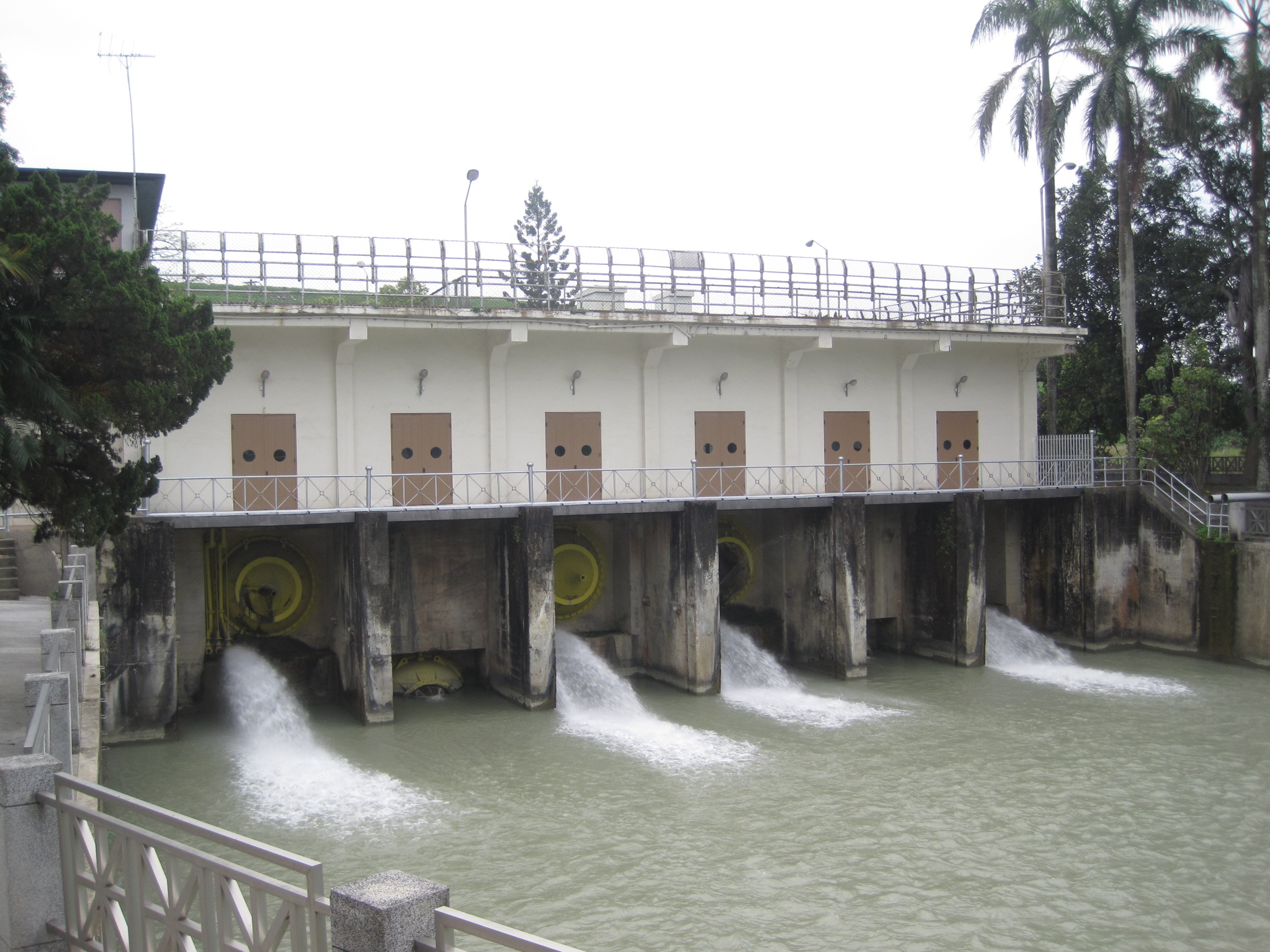
- Interactive map of Wushantou Dam 烏山頭壩
- Location: Guantian, Tainan, Taiwan
- Coordinates: 23°12′08″N 120°22′06″E
- Construction began: 1920; 106 years ago
- Opening date: 1930; 96 years ago

Dam and spillways
- Type of dam: Rock-fill
- Impounds: Zengwen River
- Height: 56 m (184 ft)
- Length: 1,273 m (4,177 ft)
- Dam volume: 11,020,928 cubic metres (389,200,400 cu ft)
- Spillway type: free-flow
- Spillway capacity: 1,500 m^{3}/s (53,000 cu ft/s)

Reservoir
- Creates: Wushantou Reservoir
- Catchment area: 58 km^{2} (22 mi^{2})
- Surface area: 13 km^{2} (3,200 acres)
- Normal elevation: 58.18 m (190.9 ft)

Power Station
- Turbines: 8.75 + 11.52 MW
- Installed capacity: 20.27 MW
- Annual generation: 84 million KWh

Wushantou Dam (Chinese: 烏山頭壩; pinyin: Wūshāntóu Bà) is an embankment dam in Guantian District, Tainan, Taiwan. The dam was designed by Yoichi Hatta and built between 1920 and 1930 during Japanese rule to provide irrigation water for the Chianan Plain as part of the Chianan Irrigation system. Because the natural flow of the Guantian River and other local streams was insufficient for irrigation of a planned 100,000 ha (250,000 acres), a tunnel was constructed to divert water from the Zengwen River to fill the reservoir. In 1974, the Zengwen Dam was completed on the Zengwen River shortly above the diversion tunnel, stabilizing and reducing the sediment load of water flowing into Wushantou Reservoir.

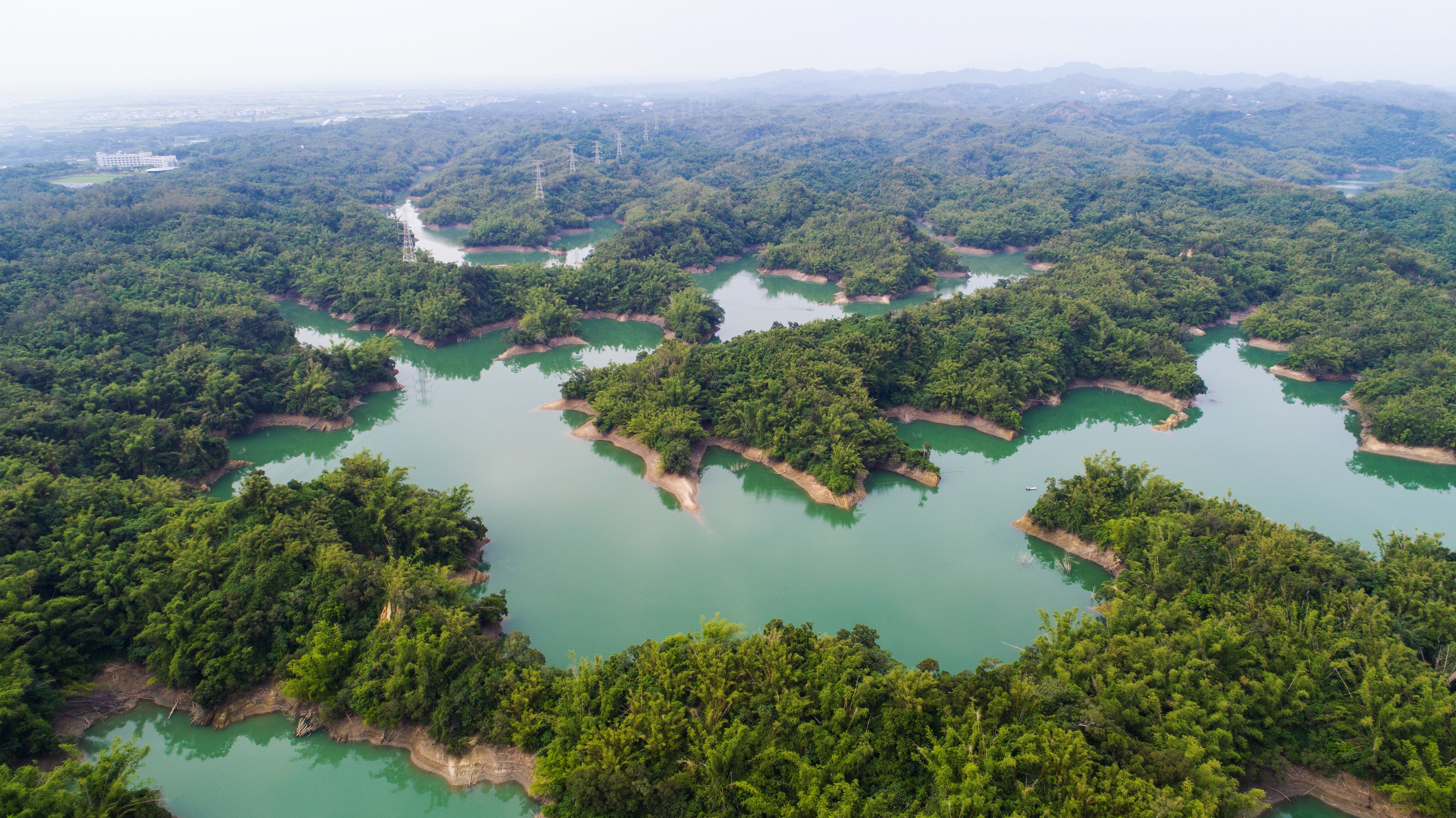
Wushantou Reservoir

The dam consists of a curved embankment 50.5 m (166 ft) high and 1,273 m (4,177 ft) long, containing 5,400,000 m^{3} (7,100,000 yd^{3}) of material. The reservoir comprises 9 km^{2} (2,200 acres) and was designed to store 154,160 dam^{3} (124,980 acre⋅ft) of water. However, as of 1990 it had been reduced to 83,759 dam^{3} (67,905 acre⋅ft) due to severe erosion problems upstream. A concrete overflow spillway is located shortly to the south of the dam, providing a maximum outflow of 1,500 m^{3}/s (53,000 cu ft/s). The dam sits at the head of a 58 km^{2} (22 mi^{2}) catchment area, which increases to 539 km^{2} (208 mi^{2}) when including the portion of the Zengwen River watershed diverted into the reservoir.

== See also ==
- List of dams and reservoirs in Taiwan
