= Nanhua =

Nanhua or Nan Hua may refer to:

== Places ==
- Nanhua County, in Yunnan, China
- Nanhua, Tainan, rural district in Tainan, Taiwan
- Nanhua Dam, dam across the Houku River in southern Taiwan

== Institutions ==
- Nanhua University, in Chiayi County, Taiwan
- Nan Hua Primary School, in Singapore
- Nan Hua High School, in Singapore
- Nanhua Temple, Buddhist monastery in Shaoguan, China
- Nan Hua Temple, Buddhist temple and seminary in Africa
