= List of potential World Heritage Sites in Taiwan =

18 potential World Heritage Sites have been identified in Taiwan by the Taiwan World Heritage Committee, of the Taiwanese Bureau of Cultural Heritage. These have not been listed as actual World Heritage Sites due to the influence of the People's Republic of China, and also because Taiwan is not a member of UNESCO or the United Nations. Taiwan has attended the Asia-Pacific Cultural Heritage Centre for UNESCO (ACCU) in Japan as observers.

== List of sites ==
Potential Heritage Site Locations

Picture	Name	Location	Description	Coordinates
	Alishan Forest Railway	Alishan, Chiayi County	Narrow-gauge railway through a variety of climates and biomes to the mountain resort of Alishan.	23°30′36″N 120°48′15″E
	Beinan Archaeological Site and Mt. Dulan	Taitung City, Taitung County	Archeological site preserving the largest and most complete prehistoric settlement in Taiwan.	22°47′39.3″N 121°06′59.2″E
	Cilan Mountain Cypress Forest	Datong, Yilan County	45,000 acre forest home to 400 year old cypress trees.	24°35′01.5″N 121°29′26.7″E
	Datun Volcano Group	Taipei/New Taipei City/Keelung	Major volcanic area with large volcanos, hot springs, and crater lakes.	25°10′17″N 121°33′18″E
	Fort San Domingo and Surrounding Historical Buildings, Tamsui	Tamsui District, New Taipei City	Colonial fort used by the Spanish, Dutch and British.	25°10′31″N 121°26′00″E
	Lo-sheng Sanatorium	Xinzhuang District, New Taipei City	Japanese colonial-era sanatorium for lepers.	25.020315194125082°N 121.40785181727236°E
	Matsu Battlefield Culture	Matsu Islands	Islands near mainland China with extensive fortifications built after the Nationalist retreat to Taiwan in the Chinese Civil War.	26°09′04″N 119°55′38″E
	Old Mountain Line Railway	Miaoli County/Taichung	Tourist railway with several historic destroyed sections.	24°23′17.60″N 120°46′55.34″E
	Orchid Island and The Tao (Yami)	Taitung County	Tropical island home to indigenous Taiwanese villages and abundant marine life.	22°03′N 121°32′E
	Paiwan & Rukai Tribal Settlements of Slate Constructions	Pingtung County	Indigenous Taiwanese villages with large and distinctive houses.	22°40′31.78″N 120°29′29.09″E
	Penghu Columnar Basalt Nature Reserve	Baisha, Penghu County	Area of columnar basalt - a rare volcanic rock formation.	23.648°N 119.634°E
	Penghu Stone Fish Weirs	Penghu County	Stone fish trap similar to others constructed by Austronesian peoples.	23°13′13.0″N 119°26′49.0″E
	Shuei-Jin-Jiou Mining Sites (Jinguashi Settlement)	Ruifang, New Taipei City	Large gold mines and former site of World War II Japanese prisoner of war camps.	25°07′N 121°51′E
	Taroko National Park	Xiulin, Hualien County	One of 9 Taiwanese National Parks, preserves a long river gorge and surrounding area.	24°10′N 121°20′E
	Taoyuan Tableland Mesa and Ponds	Taoyuan City	Historic agricultural area preserving a high density of man-made fish ponds.	24°59′28.6″N 121°18′51.58″E
	Wushantou Reservoir and Jianan Irrigation Waterways	Lioujia and Guantian Districts, Tainan City	Japanese-built irrigation system that was the largest man-made lake in Taiwan at the time of its completion.	23°12′20.5″N 120°23′24.88″E
	Yushan National Park	Nantou County	One of 9 Taiwanese National Parks, preserves a mountainous region with over thirty peaks over 3,000 metres (9,800 ft) in elevation including Taiwan's highest mountain.	23°28′12″N 120°57′26.16″E
