= Pattenrai!! ~ Minami no Shima no Mizu Monogatari =

- Theatrical poster
- Directed by: Noboru Ishiguro
- Written by: Toshiyuki Tabe
- Screenplay by: Toshiyuki Tabe
- Produced by: Toshiyuki Morii
- Cinematography: Toshiaki Yamaguchi
- Edited by: Toshihiko Kojima; Yumiko Nakaba
- Music by: Reijirō Koroku
- Production company: Mushi Productions
- Release date: November 15, 2008 (Japan)
- Running time: 90 minutes
- Country: Japan
- Language: Japanese

Pattenrai!! ~ Minami no Shima no Mizu Monogatari (パッテンライ!! ～南の島の水ものがたり～; A Tale of Water on the Southern Island) is a Japanese anime biographical film directed by Noboru Ishiguro. The film premiered on November 15, 2008. Within Japan it was released via Joueikai and Oyako Eiga. Its tagline was "Don't Give Up on Your Dreams."

The film portrays the career of Yoichi Hatta, a civil engineer active in Japanese Taiwan, and his interactions with the native Taiwanese. It was financed as a commemoration of the 115th anniversary of the Hokkoku Shimbun, a newspaper in Hatta's hometown of Kanazawa, and produced by Mushi Productions. Preview screenings were held on November 11, 2008, at Hokkoku Shimbun's Akabane Hall and on November 20 at Meiji Yasuda Life Hall (MY Shinjuku Building), while the first public screening was held on November 15 at the opening of Kanazawa's Corona Cinema World. Afterwards, it was primarily screened in schools and public institutions in Ishikawa Prefecture and from May 8, 2009, in Cinemate Mini-Theater in Shinjuku. It was also released in Taiwan.

The film's title is derived from Patten lai-a, the Taiwanese term for "Hatta has come," (Chinese: 八田來; Pe̍h-ōe-jī: Pat-tiân lâi--ah).

== Plot ==
In the early stages of Japanese colonization in Taiwan, the Chianan Plain in southwestern Taiwan was considered a barren land due to its low rainfall and lack of irrigation. Yoichi Hatta is sent to this area by the colonial government to develop plans for massive irrigation projects. At first the local farmers question Hatta's intentions and harbor feelings of hostility. But among them, a boy named Yingzhe is moved by Hatta's conviction in his project and comes to understand the necessity of a dam and wishes to become a civil engineer as well. Susumu, a boy who lives in a nearby community of Japanese laborers, has a dream of riding in an airplane. Yingzhe and Susumu are kindred spirits and discuss their dreams. But one day, over 50 people die due to a construction explosion, among them Susumu's father. There is talk of halting construction, and Hatta is distressed.

== Cast ==
- Yoichi Hatta: Kazuhiko Inoue
- Xu Yingzhe: Junko Minagawa
- Susumu Tsuji: Fujiko Takimoto
- Miyo Aragaki: Yuko Gibu
- Kenkichi Tsuji: Atsushi Gotou
- Toyoki Hatta: Tae Hitoto

== Release ==
Pattenrai!! was released on November 13, 2009, in Taiwan with a mixed Mandarin-Taiwanese dub (with some theaters opting for the original Japanese voices with Chinese subtitles). Preview screenings were held on November 4 in Xinying District, Tainan with President Ma Ying-jeou attending and on November 9 in Taipei with former President Lee Teng-hui and former President of the Executive Yuan Frank Hsieh in attendance. In 2010, it was shown in Tainan schools.

== Reception ==
Pattenrai! won the 23rd Japan Society of Civil Engineers' Cinema Committee's Most Excellent award.
