= Houku River =

River of Taiwan

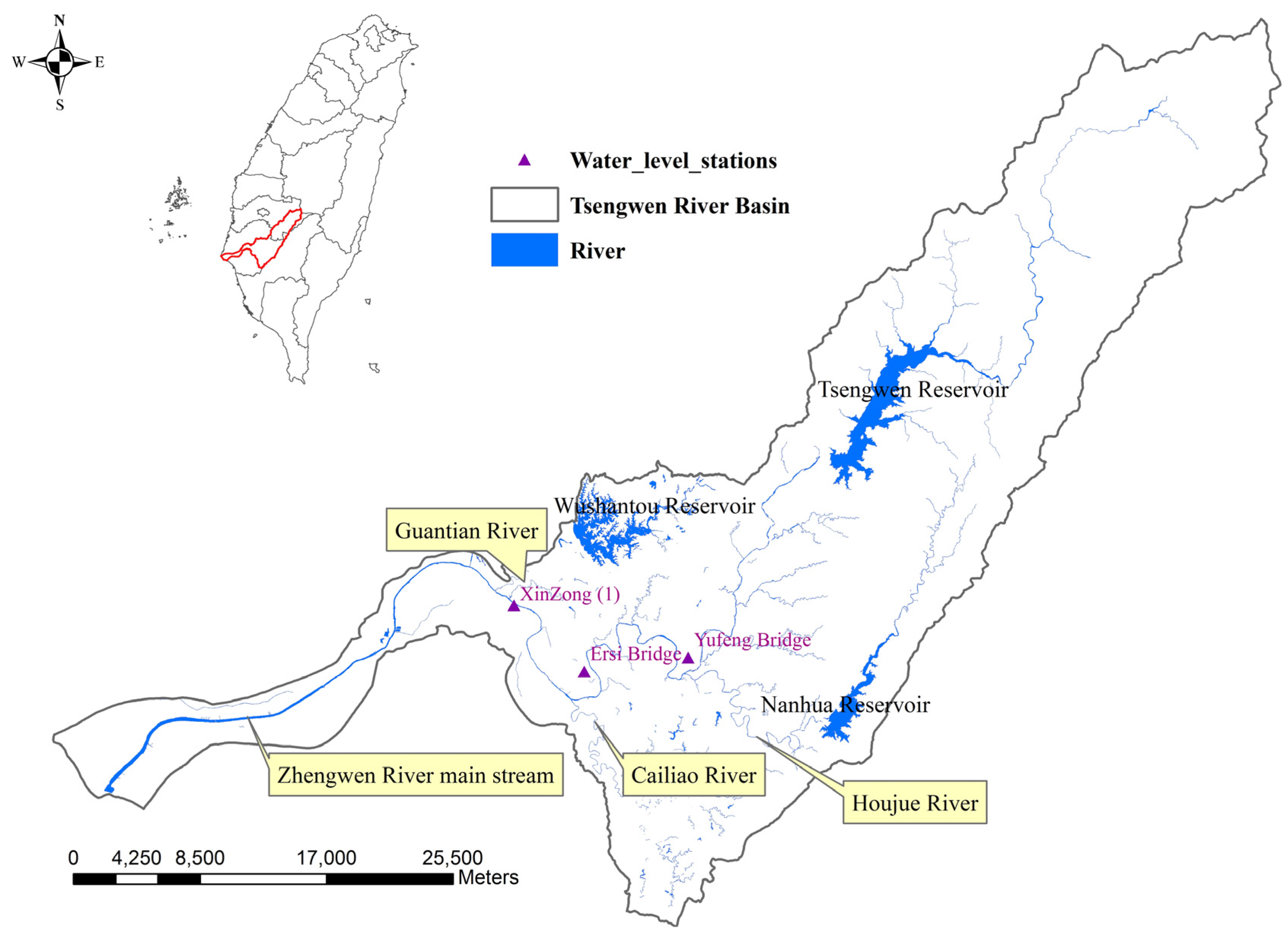
- Houku River is part of the Zengwen River basin
- Native name: 後堀溪 (Chinese)

Location
- Location: Taiwan

Physical characteristics
- Source: 三角南山
  - elevation: 1,186 m (3,891 ft)
- Mouth: Zengwen River
  - location: Yujing District, Tainan
  - coordinates: 23.113139°N 120.438696°E
- Length: 51.37 kilometres (31.92 mi)
- Basin size: 161.40 km^{2} (62.32 sq mi)

Basin features
- River system: Zengwen River

The Houku River (Chinese: 後堀溪; pinyin: Hòukū Xī), also known as the Houjue River or Houjue Creek, is a 51 km (32 mi) river of southern Taiwan, and a tributary of the Zengwen River. The river drains an area of 161 km^{2} (62 mi^{2}) in parts of Tainan, Chiayi County, and Kaohsiung City. The Nanhua Dam on the river is a major source of drinking water for metropolitan Kaohsiung.

== See also ==
- List of rivers of Taiwan
