= Nanhua Dam =

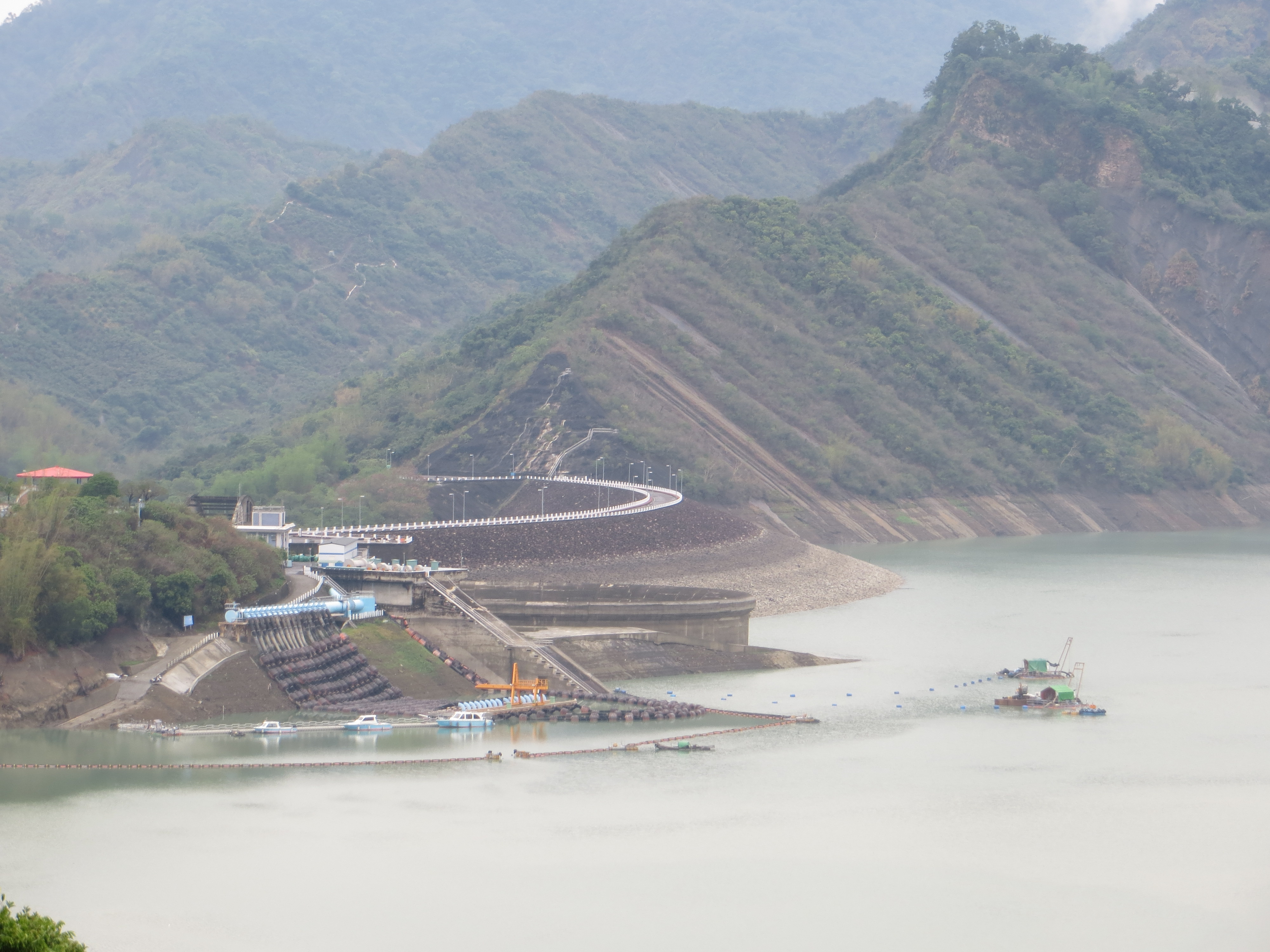
- Interactive map of Nanhua Dam
- Official name: 南化水庫
- Location: Nanhua, Tainan, Taiwan
- Coordinates: 23°05′22″N 120°32′16″E
- Construction began: 1988; 38 years ago
- Opening date: 1994; 32 years ago

Dam and spillways
- Type of dam: Earthfill
- Impounds: Houku River
- Height: 87.5 m (287 ft)
- Length: 511 m (1,677 ft)
- Spillway type: Ungated overflow, bathtub
- Spillway capacity: 4,332 m^{3}/s (153,000 cu ft/s)

Reservoir
- Total capacity: 158×10^{6} m^{3} (128,000 acre⋅ft)
- Catchment area: 512 km^{2} (198 mi^{2})
- Surface area: 5.37 km^{2} (1,330 acres)

Power Station
- Operator: Taiwan Water Corporation

Nanhua Dam (Chinese: 南化水庫; pinyin: Nánhuà Shuǐkù; Pe̍h-ōe-jī: Lâm-hoà Chúi-khò͘), originally named Houjie Dam (後堀水庫), is a dam across the Houku River, a tributary of the Zengwen River in southern Taiwan. Located at Nanhua District, Tainan, the dam was built to provide municipal water to Tainan and Kaohsiung City and is operated by the Taiwan Water Corporation. Construction work started in December 1988, and impoundment of the reservoir began in July 1993. A conduit to supply water from the reservoir to Kaohsiung was completed in October 1993 and the entire project was operational in March 1994.

The curved earthfill dam is 87.5 metres (287 ft) high and 511 metres (1,677 ft) long, impounding a reservoir with a capacity of 158 million cubic metres (128,000 acre⋅ft) and an active or useful capacity of 149.5 million cubic metres (121,200 acre⋅ft). The reservoir naturally receives water from a catchment of 104 square kilometres (40 mi^{2}), which is not enough to fill it alone. Most of the water is actually diverted through a tunnel from the Qishan River to the east, adding 408 square kilometres (158 mi^{2}) to the drainage area. The tunnel provides an average of 160.6 million m^{3} (130,200 acre feet) of water to the reservoir each year.

Because of its location in a mountainous region, Nanhua is prone to heavy sediment accumulation. A small upstream diversion weir was built to send water laden with silt through a bypass tunnel and allow the remaining clear water to enter the reservoir. However, large amounts of silt are still carried into the reservoir during flooding events. In 2009 alone, flooding caused by Typhoon Morakot dumped 17 million m^{3} (14,000 acre feet) of silt into the reservoir. In February 2010, the Taiwan Water Corporation began the first stage of a two-year sediment removal project at Nanhua.

== See also ==
- List of dams and reservoirs in Taiwan
- Zengwun Dam
