= Losheng Sanatorium =

Losheng Sanatorium 樂生療養院
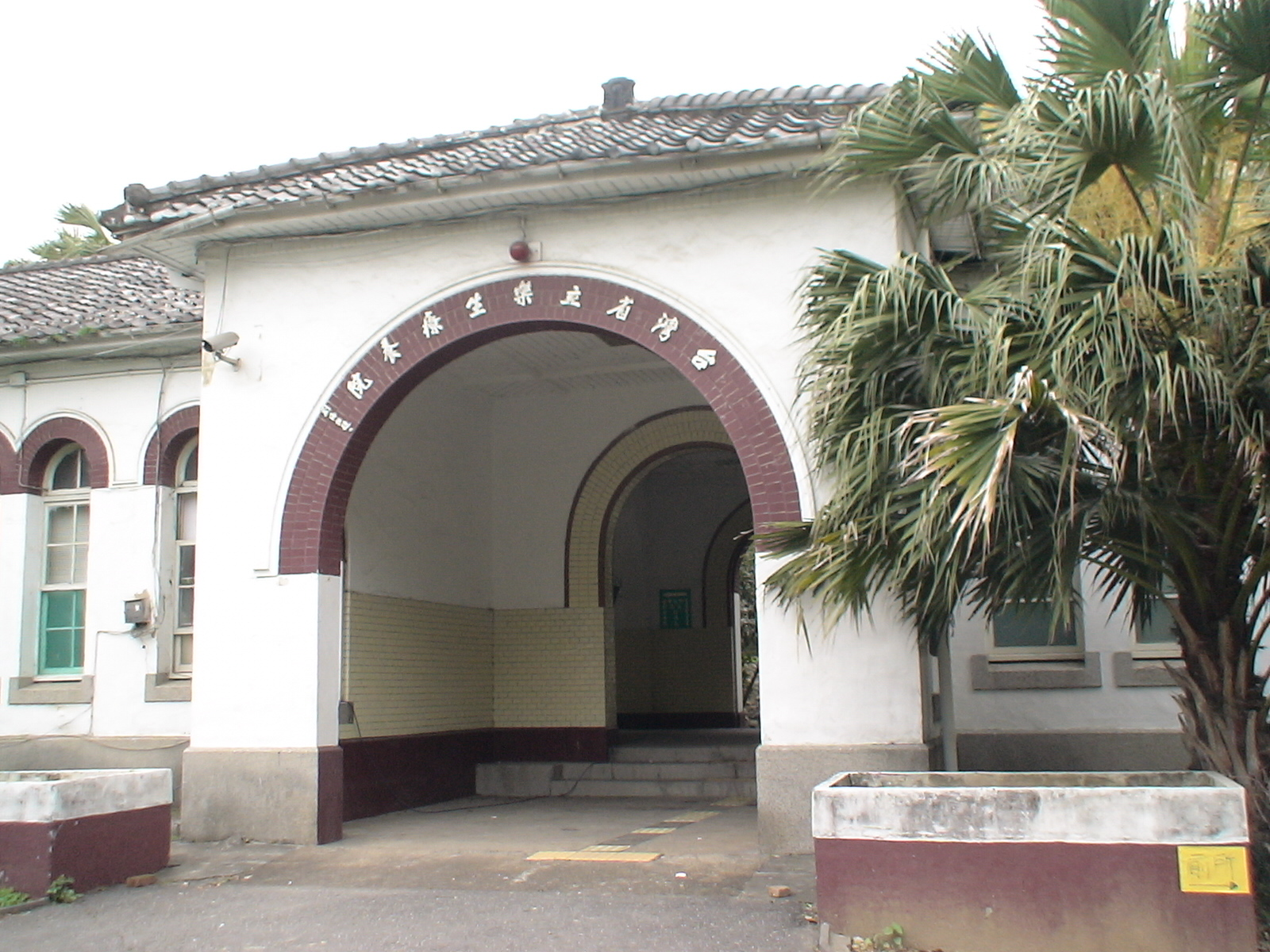

Geography
- Location: Xinzhuang, New Taipei, Taiwan
- Coordinates: 25.020315194125082°N 121.40785181727236°E

Organisation
- Type: Sanatorium

History
- Founded: 1929

Losheng Sanatorium (Chinese: 樂生療養院; pinyin: Lèshēng Liáoyǎngyuàn) is a sanatorium for lepers in Xinzhuang District, New Taipei, Taiwan. Losheng means "happy life". The building was constructed in the 1930s during the Japanese colonial period.

There were heated debates and protests about plans to replace Losheng Sanatorium with a MRT (Mass Rapid Transport) depot.

== History ==
Losheng Sanatorium, originally named Rakusei Sanatorium for Lepers of Governor-General of Taiwan Taiwan Sōtokufu Raibyō Rakuseiin (臺灣總督府癩病療養樂生院), was built in 1929 during the Japanese colonial period and served as an isolation hospital for leprosy patients. The Japanese government forced leprosy patients to live in this hospital. The first five buildings could house more than 100 patients.

During the 1930s, Losheng Sanatorium was the first leprosy hospital and the only public sanatorium for leprosy patients in Taiwan. It was designed for quarantine and treatment of lepers. With a force of sanitary police and medical officers; investigation, quarantine, and imprisonment of lepers was conducted thoroughly from 1934 till the end of colonial governance of Japan. As a result, Losheng Sanatorium became the institution of compulsory quarantine as well as lifelong imprisonment for thousands of leprosy patients. The successive KMT regime inherited the policy in its early years.

After the discovery of new leprosy treatment, patients were allowed to leave Losheng Sanatorium since 1954. However, many of them who had undergone chronic isolation and faced discrimination had little choice but to stay and had grown used to the settings.

In 1994, the Department of Taipei Rapid Transit System (DORTS) planned to build a depot in the site where Losheng Sanatorium is, for the Zhonghe–Xinlu line. Although the government built a new hospital building nearby for settling the patients, the proposed demolition of the original compound brought a series of debates and, later, a preservation movement. According to a survey conducted in March 2006, there were 165 Losheng residents living in the new hospital building and 52 living in the old compound or other places.

== Debates and preservation movement ==
Map of Xinzhuang Line zone DK196. The planned site for Xinzhuang depot includes the Sanatorium.

In 1994, Taipei Rapid Transit System planned to build a depot on the site where the sanatorium is. Chen Ching-Chuan (陳京川), the ex-director of Losheng, was opposed to this decision. He did three surveys among the patients to see what they thought and needed, shortly before he got demoted and reprimanded. Ever since, the patients have had no access to the MRT construction plans and its related discussions.

=== Fight for preservation ===
In 2001, due to the construction of Xinzhuang Line, the government planned to transform Losheng to a community hospital, thus put an end to its dedicated hospitalization and care for leprosy patients. Many students, urban planners and NGOs tried to protect this sanatorium ever since.

In 2002, the new housing projects, Huei Long Hospital (迴龍醫院) was initiated, but instead of ‘houses’ which were earlier promised to the patients, the new director gave them two tall buildings with modern hospital facilities. It became clear that the new administration team intended to run a hospital business. The skyscraper-ish hospital buildings were designed mainly for housing short-term patients; therefore it has inadequate space for residents to move around freely. Moreover, the hospital management forbids patients from bringing with them personal belongings; from cooking; and from coming over to the front building. The policy is discriminative.

Long before the depot construction was initiated, Loshen’s ex-director and history professionals have demanded a large-scale inspection of Losheng’s position as a historical site. The scholars appealed to the MRT Department that they should spare the Losheng Sanatorium, while they unanimously agreed the entire site should be preserved. However, the officials unilaterally terminated the process of inspection, and decided the sanatorium should be torn down entirely.

It was not until 2004, when Prof. John K.C. Liu (劉可強) came up with a symbiosis plan, and when the Council for Cultural Affairs has deemed the sanatorium a historical spot, that the MRT Department was pressured to rethink the possibilities of preservation.

=== Reasons for preservation ===
People who claimed that the Losheng Sanatorium should be preserved have raised the following issues:

The MRT depot was originally planned to be built Yingpan (營盤) near Fu Jen Catholic University (FJU, 天主教輔仁大學), and Fu Jen University Station should be the terminal station, which is why the number of that station is O1, meaning "first station of Orange Line".

But the plan was altered by local politicians. It has been asserted that this is wrong for the following reasons:

1. Waste of money: 3/5 of the depot site needs to be built on flatland; therefore $90 million (USD) will be spent on flattening and improving the soil.
2. Disaster for the environment: After flattening the mountain, a ten-story retaining wall will remain, destroying the natural environment.
3. Safety concern: The future depot will be on earth faults.
4. Ravaged historical site: The Losheng Sanatorium is an important cultural asset for East Asia. The depot construction will turn it all into dust.
5. Ordeal for patients: The patients are forced to leave the place they spent their lives, suffering mentally and physically from the displacement.
6. Autocratic decision-making: The MRT Department never inquired the needs of Losheng patients—the ‘residents’ of the site—which is a violation of fundamental human rights.

In 2009, the Losheng Sanatorium was named a potential World Heritage Site, "because it has witnessed the development of politics, medicine, public health and human rights in Taiwan over several decades."

=== Doubts for the 90% plan ===
In the press release issued by the Council for Cultural Affairs on Jan. 23, 2007, it was stated that

“according to recent news, some local representatives and organizations in Taipei City and Taipei County claimed that the 90% Losheng preservation plan proposed by CCA will severely delay the MRT construction. Hereby CCA reiterates that the 90% preservation plan, evaluated by Hsin-Lu cooperation, will lengthen the construction period for about four months, and appends a three billion budget to it. It is not true to say the MRT construction will be delayed for two to three years.”

This press release concluded that it is untrue for the media and Department of Taipei Rapid Transit System (DORTS, Taipei) to say that the 90% preservation plan will delay the construction of MRT for two to three years and result in a two to three hundred billion NTD (approx. 760 million USD) increase in budget.

=== Timeline ===
11 March 2007

The activists held a sit-in protest in front of Premier Su Tseng-chang's house and demanded to negotiate with the premier. The protestors, consisting of students and remaining Losheng patients, were forced by the police into buses, immediately transported to suburban mountainous areas around Taipei City, and were ordered not to return to the scene that day.

16 March 2007

There were scuffles as the authorities attempted to post the official notice issued by the Taipei County government to request the management of sanatorium to tear down the structure by 16 April 2007. Four students were arrested, and the protest organizers condemned police for the unnecessary violence against protesters.

15 April 2007

A protest march of thousands of people from all over the country took place in Taipei on the day that had been announced for the eviction of the remaining 45 residents of the Sanatorium. Hsu Po-jen (許博任) of the Youth Alliance for Losheng was reported as saying that more than 100 civic groups took part.

30 May 2007

The Public Construction Commission ruled that 39 buildings of Losheng Sanatorium should be preserved, 10 to be reconstructed or reconstituted in selected locations, and 6 to be demolished. The project budget would increase NTD 670 million.

== Image gallery ==
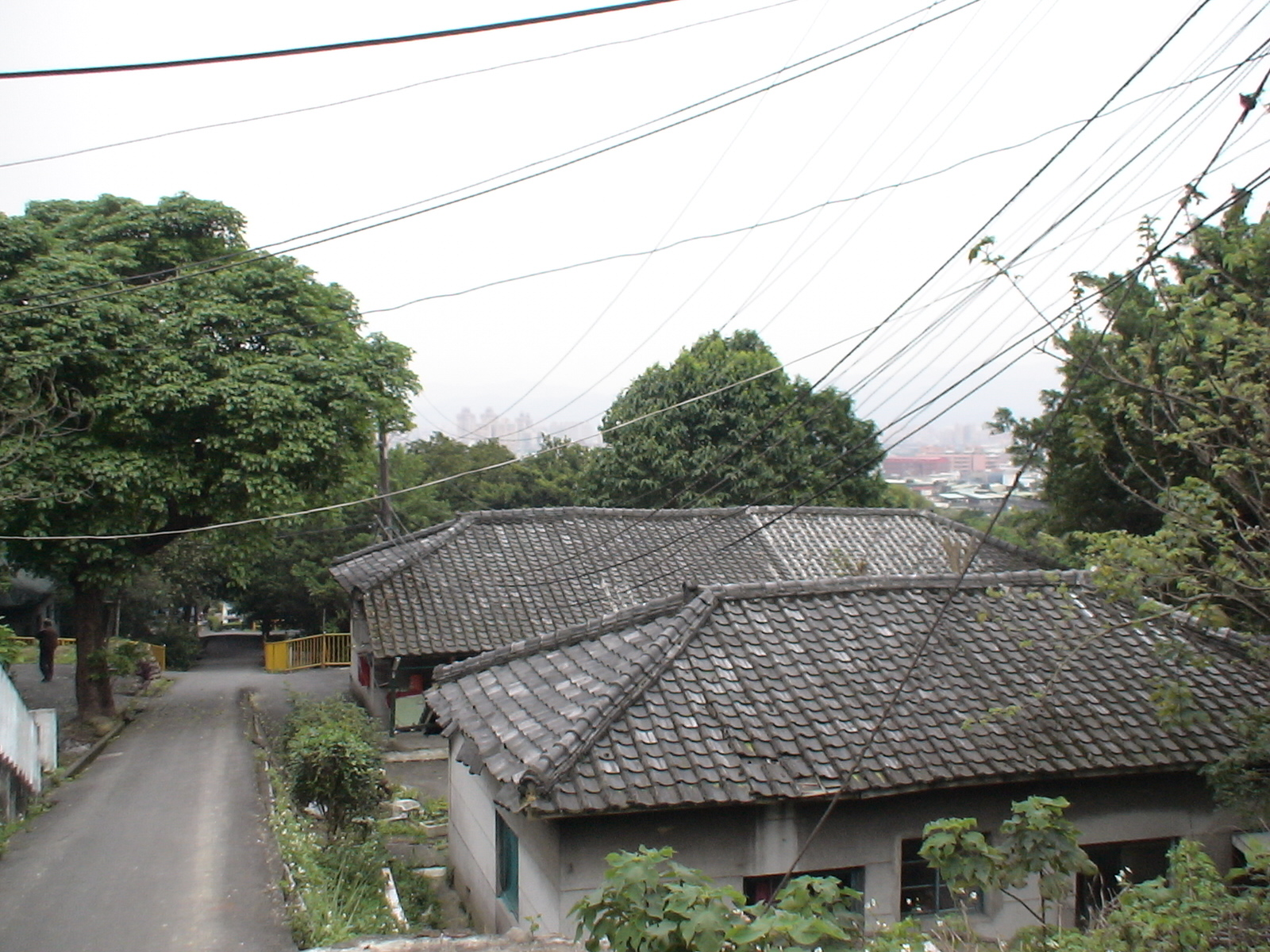
Whole sanatorium is on the hill

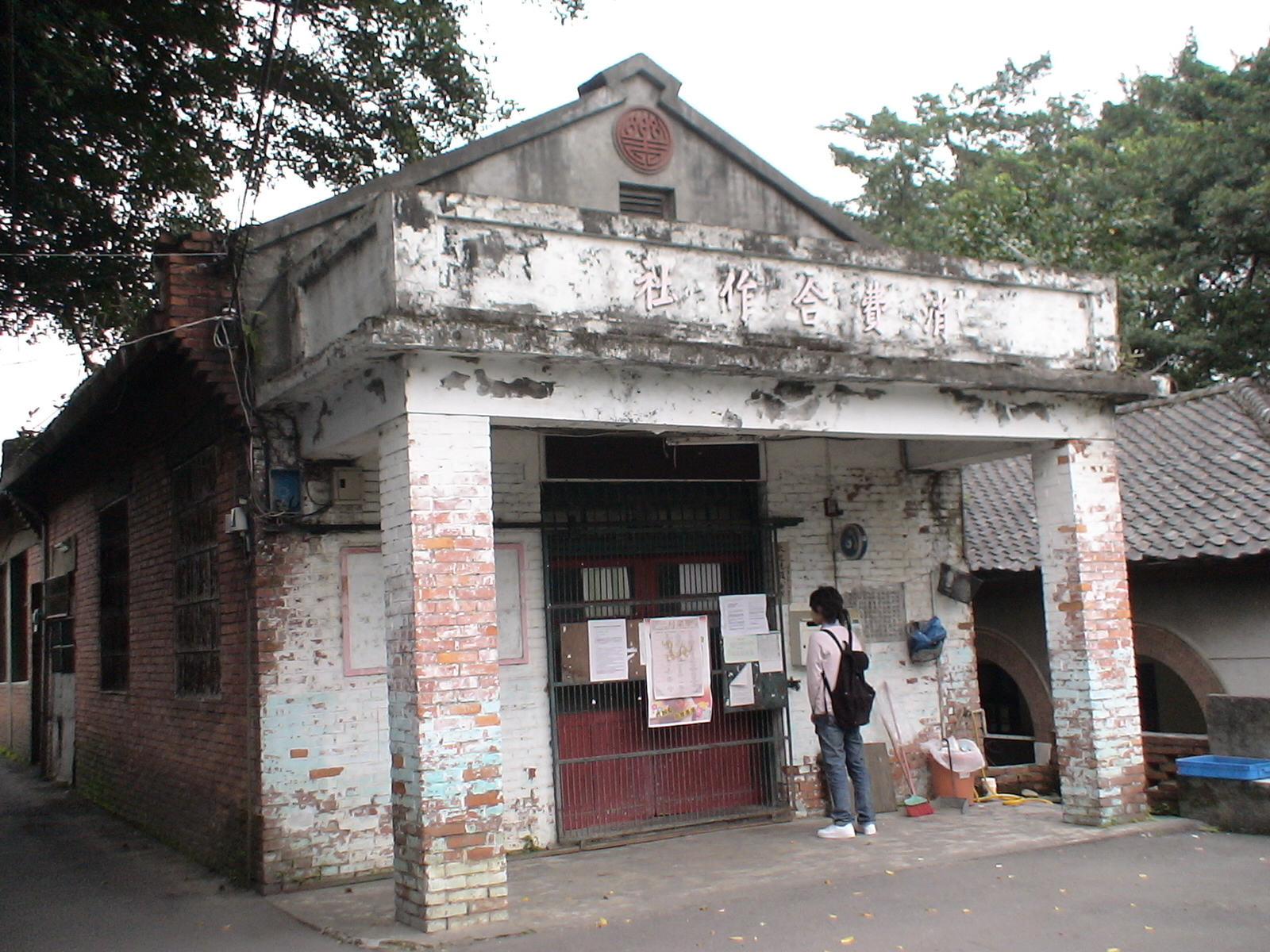
Convenience shop

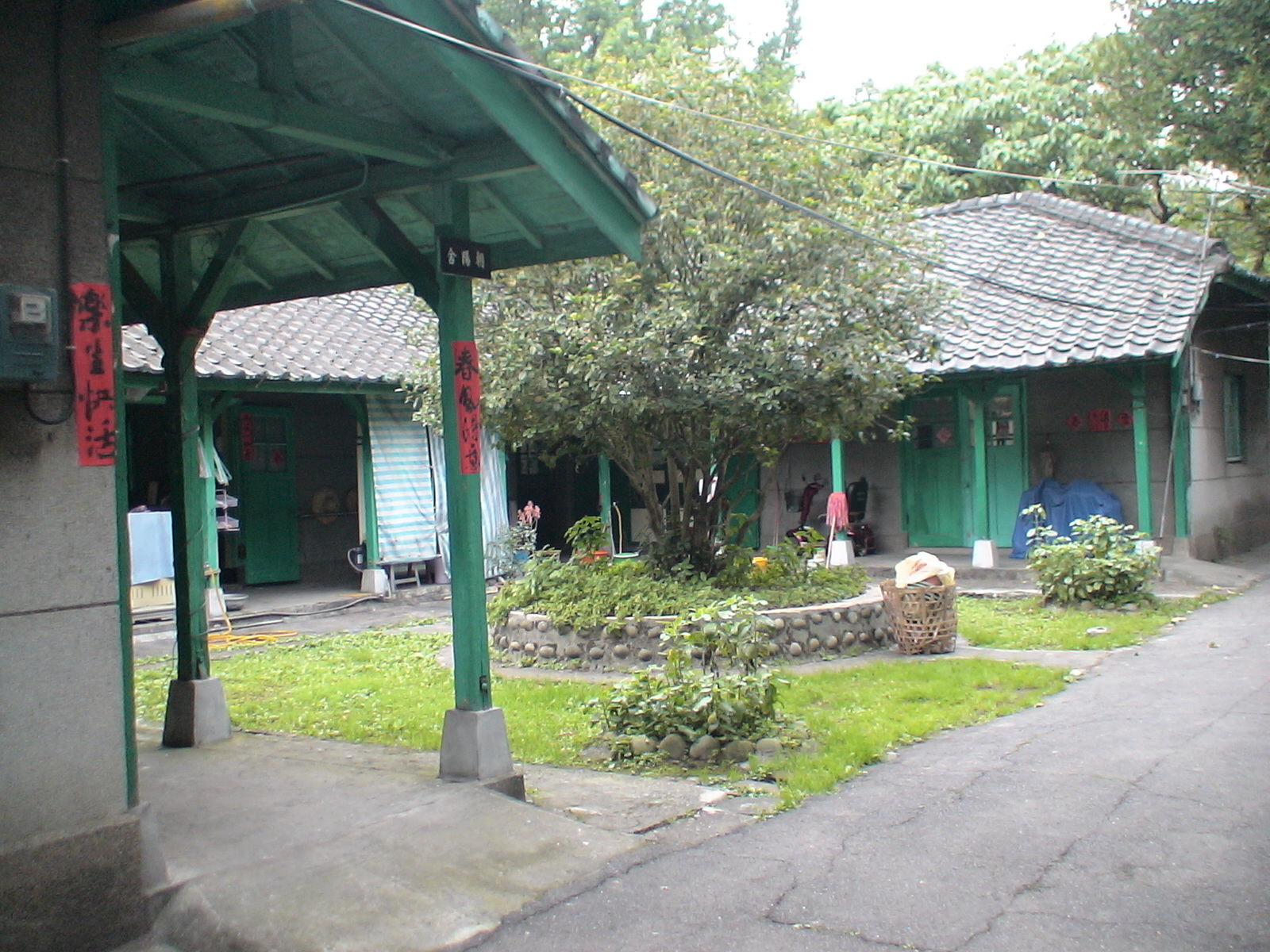
Dormitory

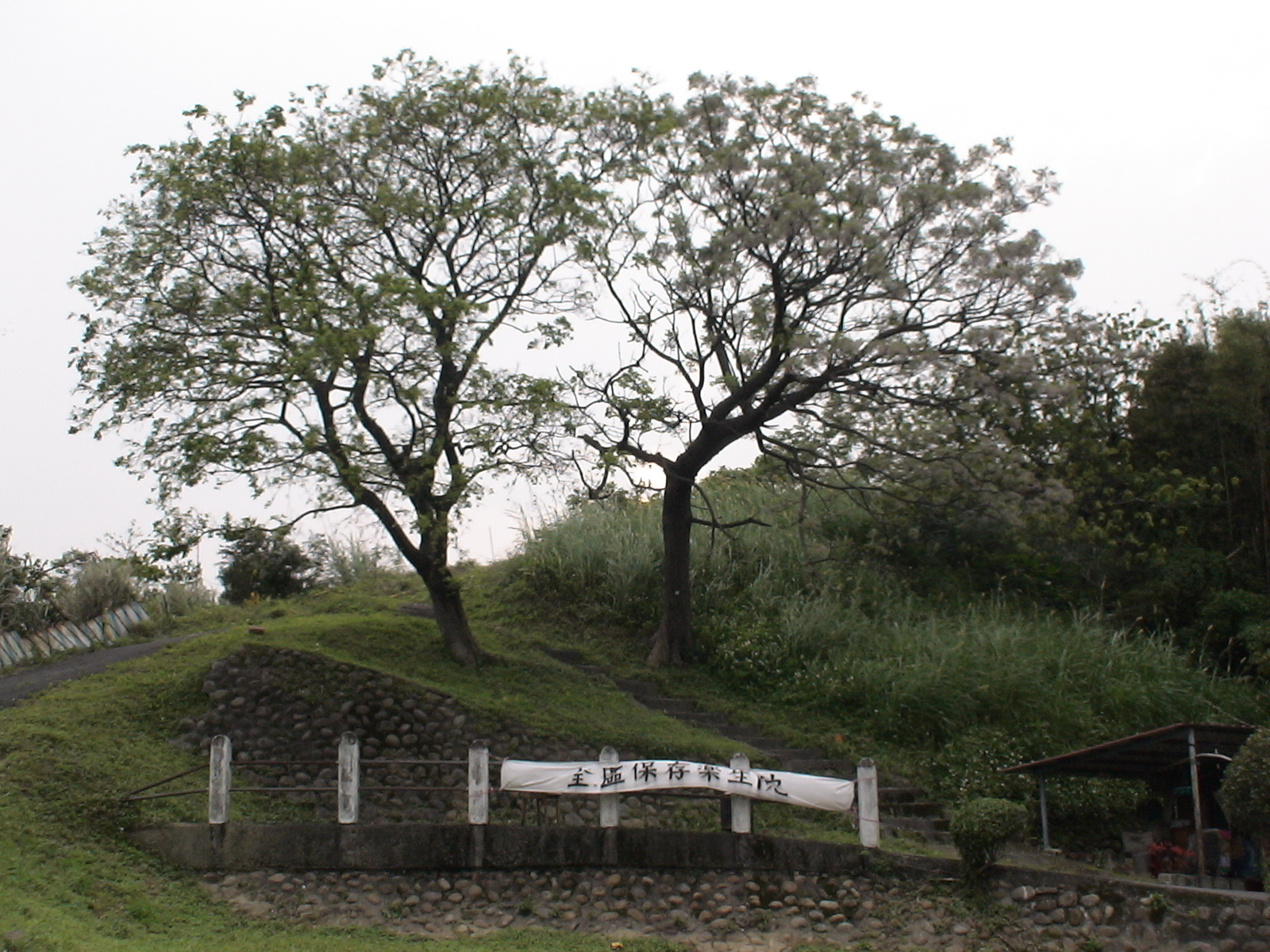
"Keep Losheng completely"

== See also ==
- Leper colony
- Leprosy
