= Nanhua District =

District in Tainan, Taiwan

Coordinates: 23.043484°N 120.477079°E

Nanhua 南化區
- District
- Nanhua District
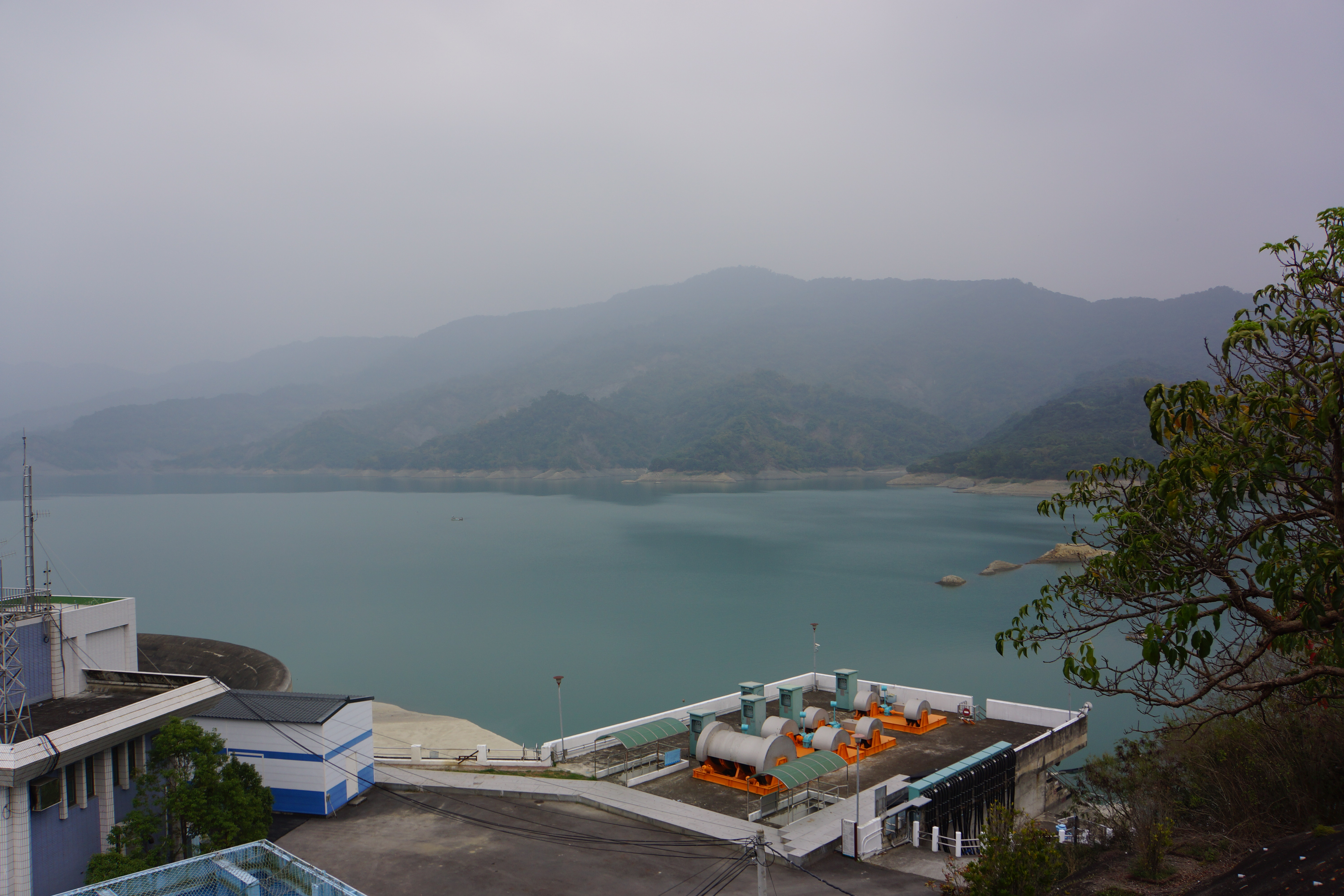
- Nanhua Reservoir

- Nanhua District in Tainan City
- Location: Tainan, Taiwan

Area
  - Total: 172 km^{2} (66 sq mi)

Population (May 2022)
  - Total: 8,209
  - Density: 47.7/km^{2} (124/sq mi)
- Website: nanhuadistrict.tainan.gov.tw (in Chinese)

Nanhua District (Chinese: 南化區; pinyin: Nánhuà Qū; Pe̍h-ōe-jī: Lâm-hoà-khu) is a rural district of about 8,209 residents in Tainan, Taiwan. It has two reservoirs, the larger one being the Nanhua Reservoir. It is the largest district in the city.

== History ==
After the handover of Taiwan from Japan to the Republic of China in 1945, Nanhua was organized as a rural township of Tainan County. On 25 December 2010, when Tainan County merged with Tainan City, Nanhua became a district of Tainan City.

== Administrative divisions ==
Administrative divisions of Nanhua District

The district consists of Nanhua, Xiaolun, Zongken, Beiping, Donghe, Xipu, Beiliao, Yushan and Guanshan Village.

== Tourist attractions ==
- Baoguang Temple
- Houde Zizhu Temple
- Longhu Temple
- Nanhua Dam
- Nanhua Ecological Park
- Wushan Macaque Preservation Area
