= Yoichi Hatta =

Japanese engineer (1886–1942)

- 八田與一 はった よいち
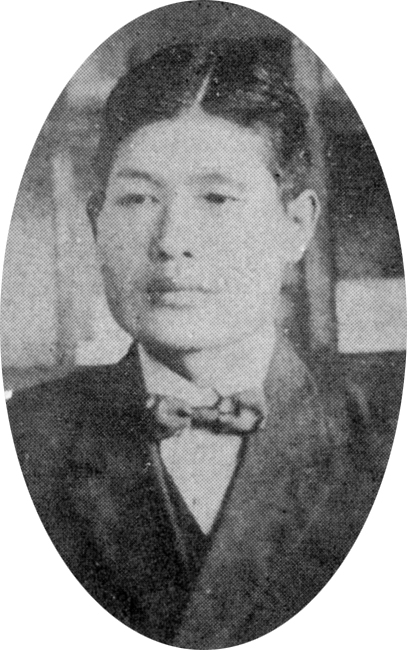
- Born: February 21, 1886; Hanazono Village, Kahoku County, Ishikawa Prefecture, Empire of Japan
- Died: May 8, 1942 (aged 56); Off the coast of the Gotō Islands, Nagasaki Prefecture, Empire of Japan
- Education: Tokyo Imperial University
- Occupation: Hydraulic engineer
- Notable work: Construction of Wushantou Dam

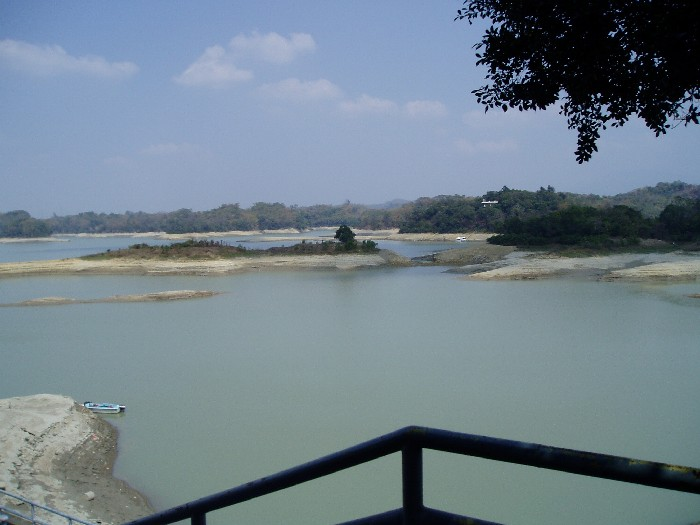
Wusanto Reservoir

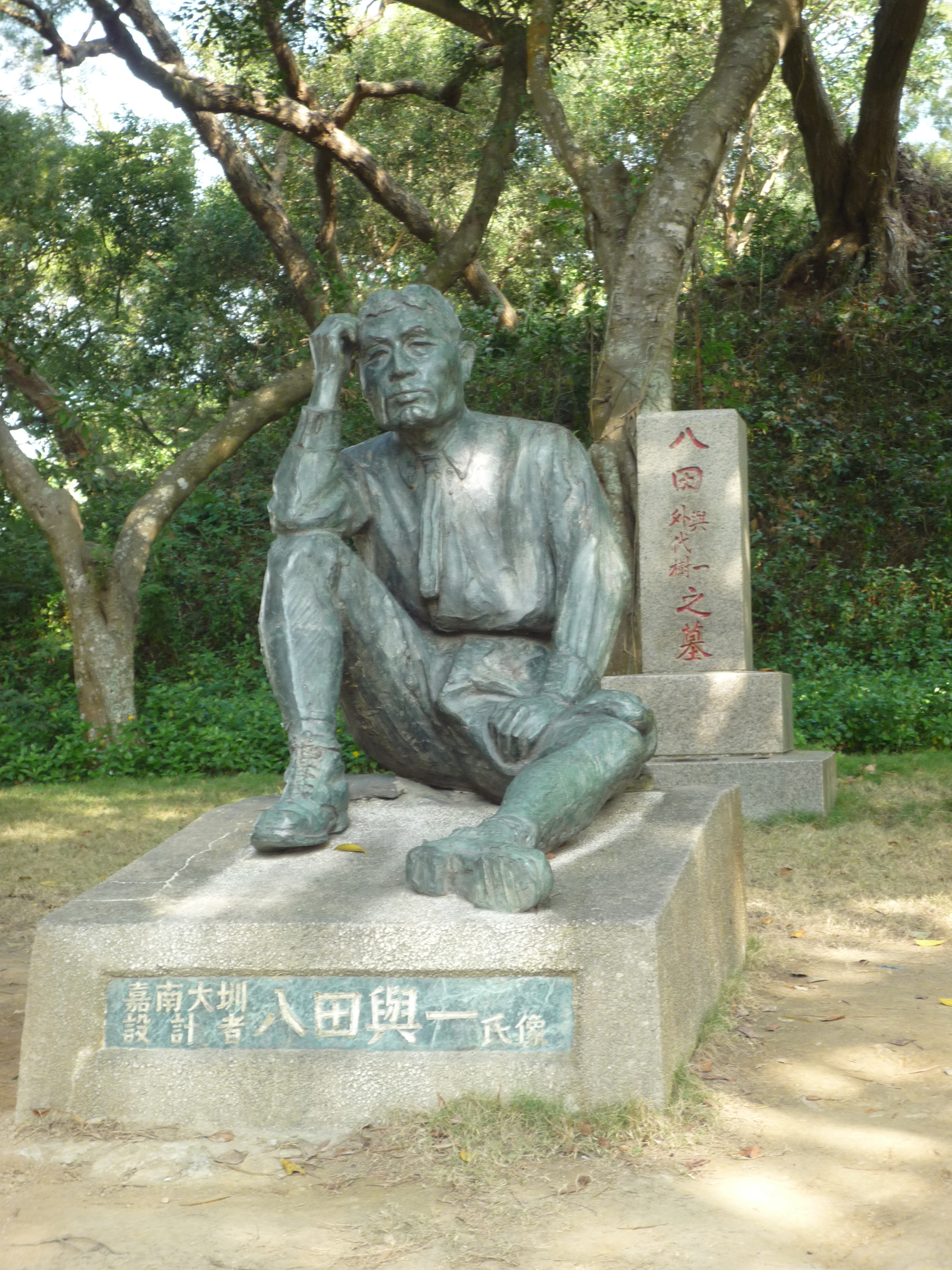
Yoichi Hatta's statue and tomb with his wife Toyoki, located in Wushanto Reservoir, Tainan city, Taiwan.

Yoichi Hatta (八田 與一, Hatta Yoichi; February 21, 1886 – May 8, 1942) was a Japanese engineer, known for his contributions in hydraulic engineering in the Japanese-ruled Taiwan. Hatta was born in Kanazawa, Ishikawa. After graduating from Tokyo Imperial University in 1910, he joined the Seat of Governor-General of Taiwan and served as a technician of the government. He was the designer of Chianan Canal and Wusanto Reservoir.

He was killed on board the transport ship Taiyō Maru, when it was torpedoed and sunk on May 8, 1942 by US submarine Grenadier.

In contemporary Taiwan, he is honored for his contributions to irrigation.

== See also ==
- Pattenrai!! ~ Minami no Shima no Mizu Monogatari
