= Chianan Irrigation =

Irrigation system in Taiwan

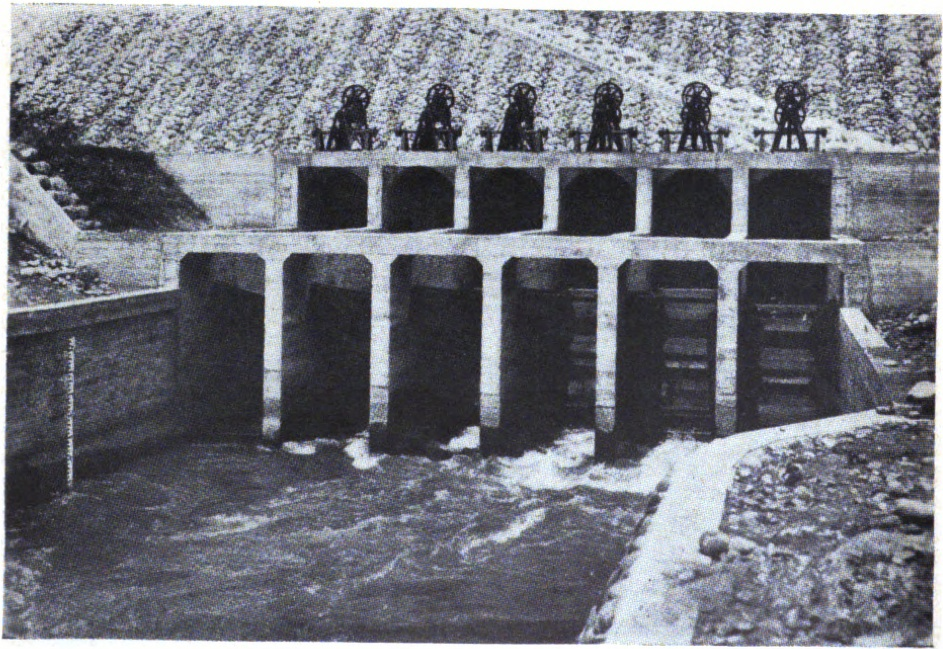
A control gate photographed in Japanese era.

The main streams of Chianan Canal.

Chianan Irrigation (Chinese and Japanese: 嘉南大圳; pinyin: Jianán Dàzùn; rōmaji: Kanan Taishū; lit. 'Chianan Great Ditch'), also known as the Kanan Irrigation System, was built to support agricultural production in the Chianan Plain of Taiwan. The name "chia-nan" was derived from two place names within its surrounding area called Chiayi and Tainan. Although it includes some other facilities, such as the Wusanto Reservoir, the term "Chianan Canal", in a narrow sense, would only mean the canals of this system.

The main designer of the Chianan Canal is Yoichi Hatta, a civil engineer of the Japanese government. Its main streams pass through today's Tainan, Chiayi and Yunlin, formerly parts of Tainan Prefecture. The architectural work of canal was launched in 1920 and completed in 1930, during Japanese rule. The canal improved the plantable area for rice from 5000 to 150,000 hectares, and made the rice crops in its irrigated area able to be harvested three times annually.

In 2009 it was listed as a potential World Heritage Site.

== See also ==
- Economic history of Taiwan
- Peikang River
- Tsengwen River
