= Chiayi–Tainan Plain =

Alluvial plain in western Taiwan

Chiayi–Tainan Plain 嘉南平原
- Alluvial plain
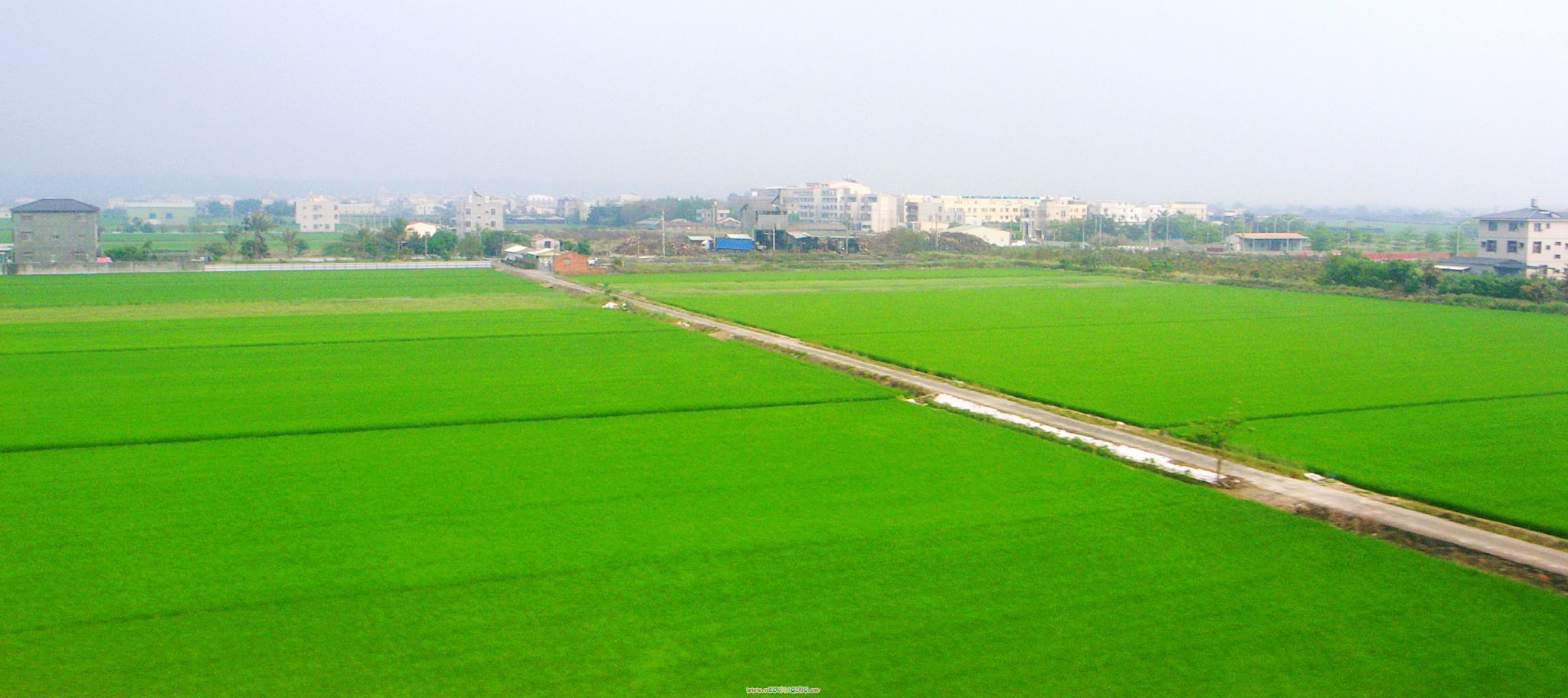

- Location within Taiwan
- Coordinates: 22°59′N 120°11′E
- Location: Taiwan
- Geology: Alluvial plain

Area
  - Total: 4,550 km^{2} (1,760 sq mi)

Dimensions
  - Length: 110 km (68 mi)
  - Width: 71 km (44 mi)

The Jianan, or Chianan Plain (Chinese: 嘉南平原; pinyin: Jiānán Píngyuán), is the main plain of the island, located at the central-southern region of western Taiwan.

It lies in Tainan City and Chiayi County/Chiayi City, from which the name of the plain derived. It also includes some portions of Taichung, Yunlin County, Changhua County, and Kaohsiung City. There are several rivers flowing through it, such as the Zengwun River.

Historically, the plain was mostly inhabited by Taiwanese Aborigines, a small fraction of the population today. Since the era of the Qing Dynasty, the Chianan Plain became a main destination of Han immigrants. This area also supplies many food crops to the whole island of Taiwan since the Japanese-ruled era.

== Geography ==
The alluvial plain of the Choshui River (colored green) is a part of the Chianan Plain (colored yellow) in a broad sense. The borders of plains in this image are in accordance with the groundwater zones of Taiwan.

The Chianan Plain faces the Taiwan Strait on the west, Taichung Basin on the north, Pingtung Plain on the southeast, and lies to the west of foothills that extend from the Alishan Mountains. The area determined by dividing the groundwater zones of Taiwan is about 4,550 km^{2} (1,757 sq mi). Between broadest points, the plain is about 71 km (44 mi) wide and 110 km (68 mi) long.

Average rainfall in this area is about 1600 mm, lowest in the whole island of Taiwan, and the rainy season is in summer, thus the plain lacks rain in winter. Rivers which pass through this region are the Peikang River, Putzu River, Pachang River, Chishui River, Tsengwen River, Yenshui River and Erhjen River. These rivers flow over the plain roughly from the eastern mountainous area to the western seacoast, and discharge into the Taiwan Strait.

== History ==
About 6000 years ago, the lands near the seacoast of the Chianan Plain were flooded by seawater, and emerged gradually since 5000 years ago. Several archaeological sites are located here, including some late neolithic cultures such as the Tahu Culture, which existed between 3500 and 2000 years ago. The Iron Age Niaosung Culture appeared from 2000 to 500 years ago.

The Hoanya people are known in written history to have lived in the northern part of Chianan Plain, and the Siraya people lived in the south. Han Chinese began to immigrate to the Chianan Plain since the European-ruled era of Taiwan. After the Koxinga defeated the Dutch to claim Taiwan in 1662, Han people ruled this region, and became the majority later. Most of them came from Zhangzhou and Quanzhou of Fujian, and Chaozhou of Guangdong, in the era of the Qing Dynasty.

Japanese started to rule Taiwan in 1895. In this era, the colonial government launched infrastructure and businesses on the Chianan Plain, such as the Western Line railway, the irrigation system of the Chianan Canal, and sugar production companies which were later combined into the Taiwan Sugar Corporation. After the Japanese Empire collapsed, the Republic of China held Taiwan. National Highway No. 1 and National Highway No. 3, which pass through this region, were built in the late 20th century.

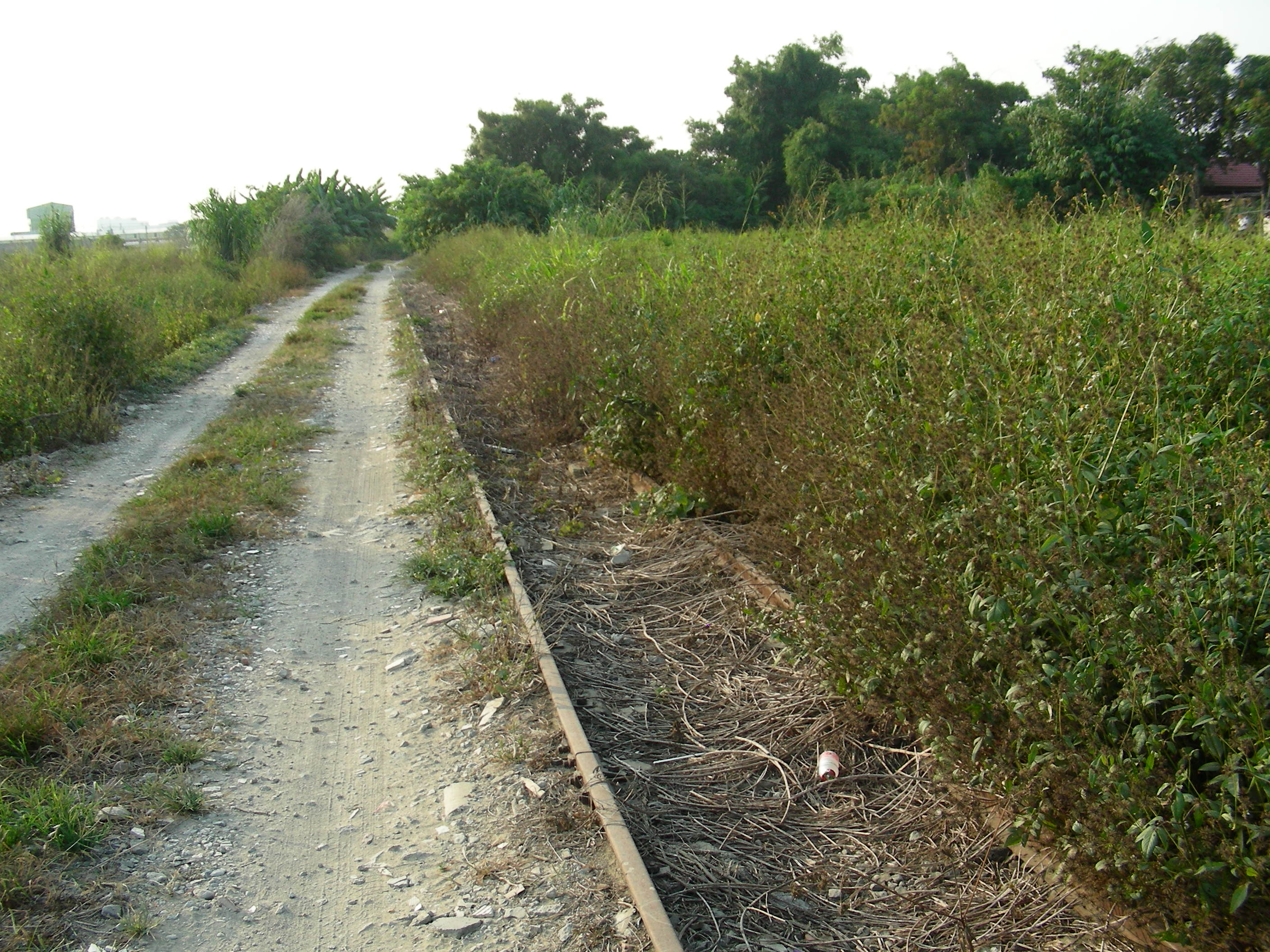
A disused sugar railway in the Chianan Plain. It belonged to the Guanmiao Line of the Taiwan Sugar Corporation.

== Economy ==
The Chianan Plain is a place of cultivation of wet rices and other minor food grains. It is the main planting area of sugarcane in Taiwan, but sugar production is being gradually reduced. The area can reap three rice harvests annually since the Chianan Canal was established, and also produces peanuts, corn, sweet potatoes and some floricultural plants and vegetables. The plain was once a place of salt production, but most of the salt evaporation ponds have been abandoned in recent years. Additionally, many fish farms are located along the seacoast.

There are several industrial parks located in Chianan Plain, such as Changhua Coastal Industrial Park and Linhai Industrial Park. Heavy industries situated in this area include oil refining, steel making and shipbuilding. It also has two relatively newer high-tech industrial parks named Tainan Science Park and Kaohsiung Science Park.

== Climate ==
The Chianan Plain belongs to the subtropical monsoon climate and tropical monsoon climate, characterized by heavy rainfall in summer and warm temperatures throughout the year.

== See also ==
- List of Taiwanese superlatives
