= Guantian District =

Coordinates: 23°11′N 120°20′E

Guantian 官田區
- District
- Guantian District
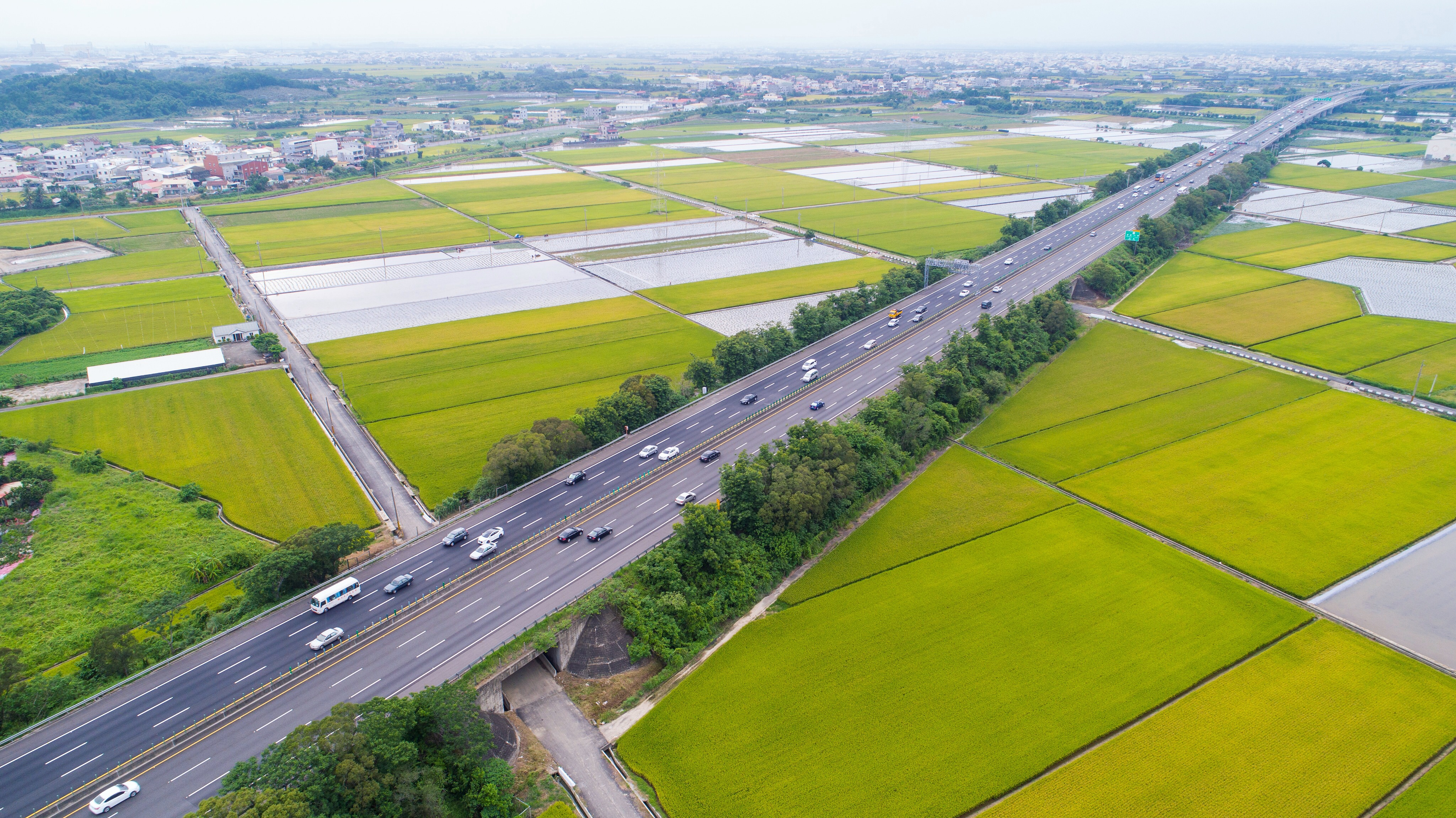

- Guantian District in Tainan City
- Country: Taiwan
- Special municipality: Tainan

Area
  - Total: 70.80 km^{2} (27.34 sq mi)

Population (January 2023)
  - Total: 20,866
- Website: guantian132.tainan.gov.tw/en/

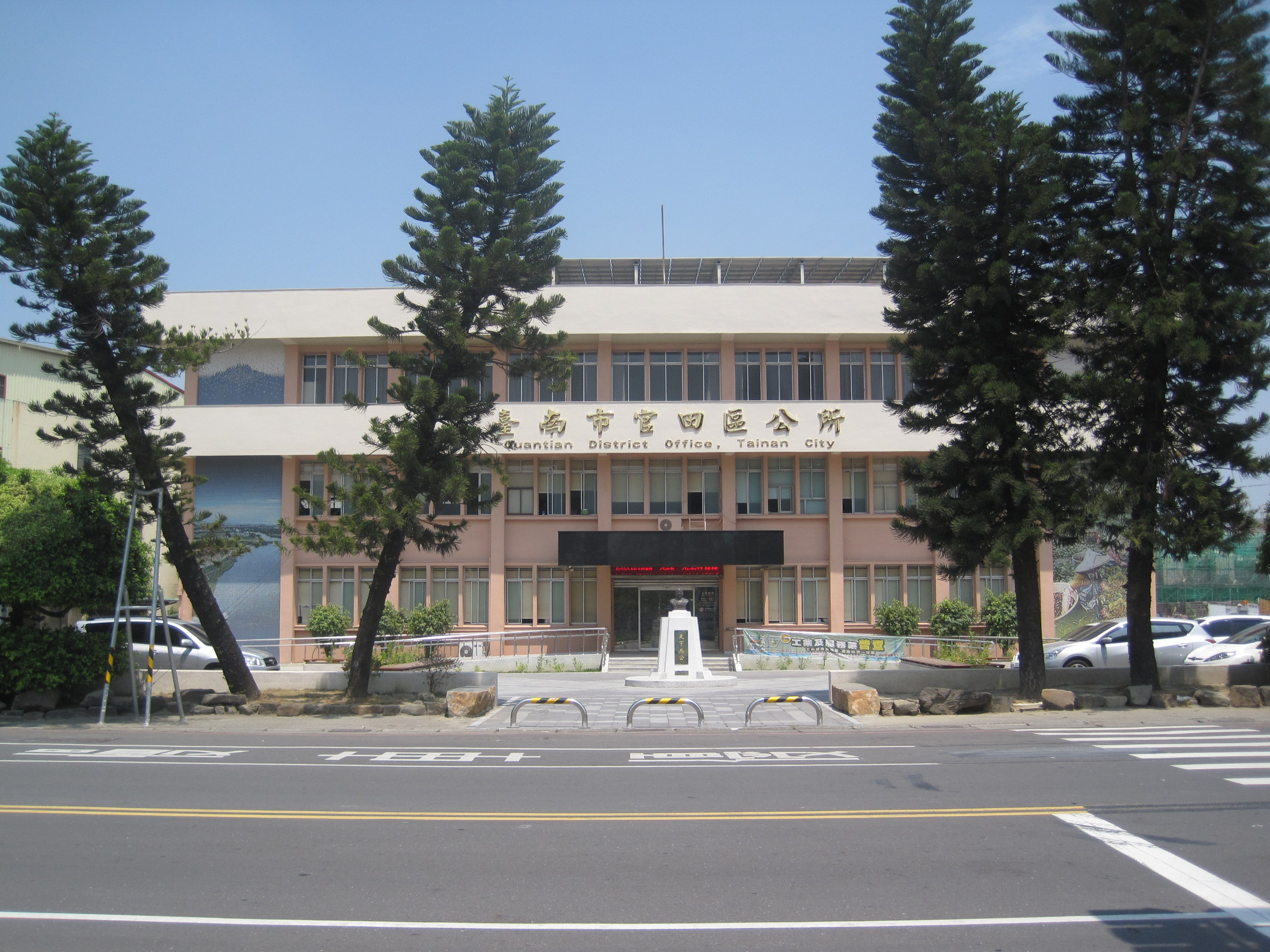
Guantian District office

Guantian District (Chinese: 官田區; pinyin: Guāntián Qū; Wade–Giles: Kuan^{1}-t‘ien^{2} Ch‘ü^{1}; Pe̍h-ōe-jī: Koaⁿ-tiān-khu) is a rural district in central Tainan, Taiwan. It is the hometown of former Taiwanese President Chen Shui-bian. It hosts a population of 20,866 residents.

== History ==
Guantian (官田) was formerly known as the "Guantian" (官佃). During Dutch rule, this area belonged to the government as "Wang Tian" (王田). During Ming Zheng rule, Wang Tian was changed to "Guantian", and the land was handed over to the civil and military officials, who can then recruit the farmers. Among them, the Chen Yonghua family had the most commitments and gradually formed a Han Chinese settlement, hence the name "Guantian" (官佃).

Under the Qing rule, it became "Guantian village" (官佃庄). During the Japanese colonial era in 1920, it was renamed as "Guantian village" (官田庄), belonging to Zengwun County, Tainan Prefecture. In 1953 after the war, it became "Guantian Township" (官田鄉). On 25 December 2010, it was renamed as "Guantian District" (官田區).

Guantian District had human activities since three thousand years ago, but it was only officially established a hundred years ago under Japanese rule. Although the district administration of Guantian District is young, the history of the people and the land can be traced back to ancient times.

== Administrative divisions ==
The district consists of Guantian, Erzhen, Daqi, Longtian, Longben, Nanbu, Shezi, Wushantou, Duba and Tungxizhuang Village.

== Education ==
=== Universities ===
- Tainan National University of the Arts

=== Schools ===
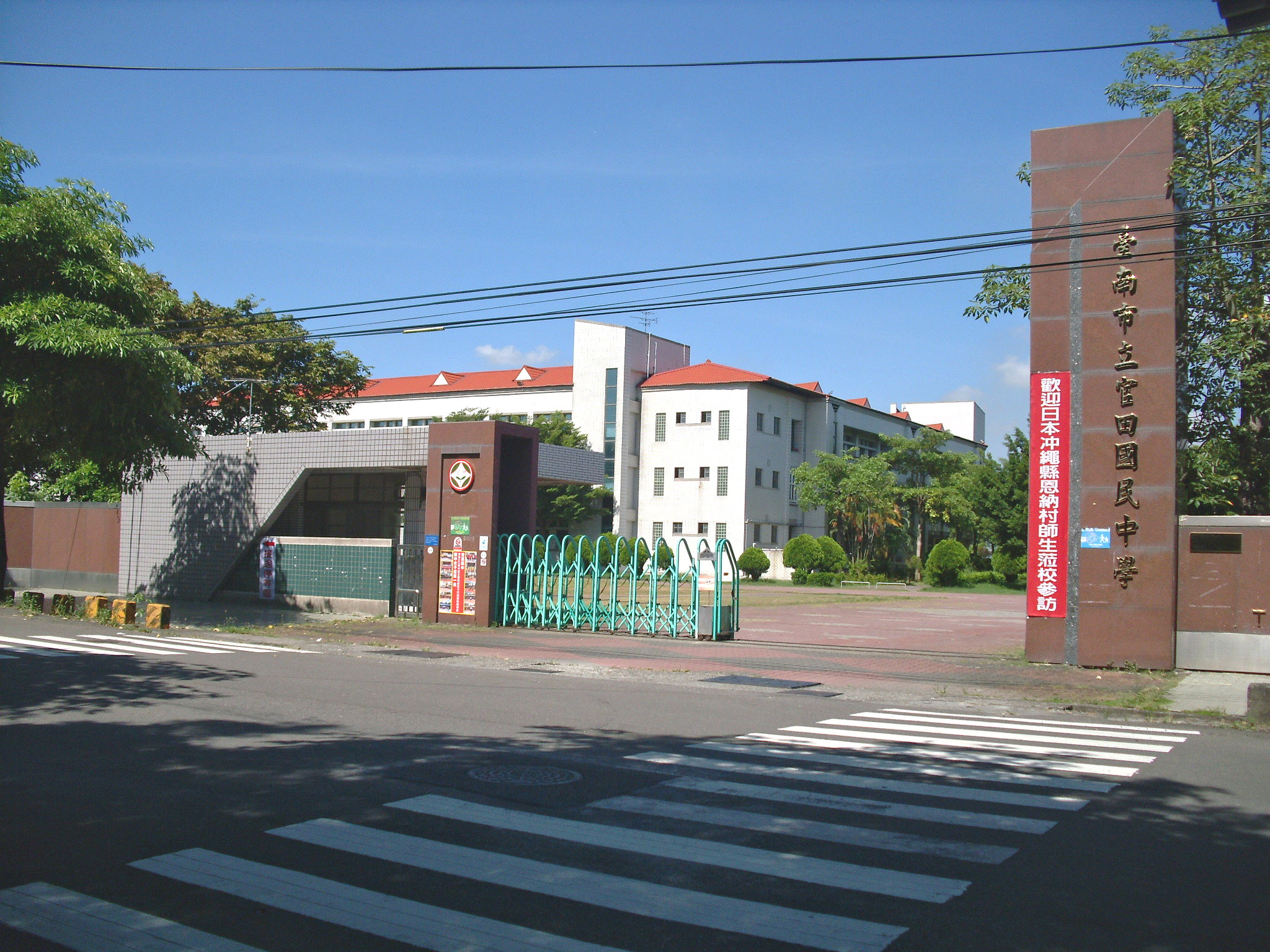
Guantian Junior High School

- Guantian Junior High School
- Chianan Elementary School
- Duba Elementary School
- Guantian Elementary School
- Lungtian Elementary School

== Transportation ==
- Balin railway station
- Longtian railway station
- Exits 329 and 334 of Freeway 3
- Exits 21 and 26 of Provincial Highway 84
- Provincial Highway 1
- City Routes 165, 171, and 176

== Tourist attractions ==
- Holiday Villa Mango Market
- Hulu Pond Water Chestnut Field
- Longtian Distillery
- Longtian Night Market
- Sijhuang Village Residence of President Chen Shui-Bian
- Wushantou Reservoir

== Notable people ==
- Chen Shui-bian, President of the Republic of China (2000–2008)
- Hsu Tain-tsair, Mayor of Tainan City (2001–2010)
