= Zengwen River =

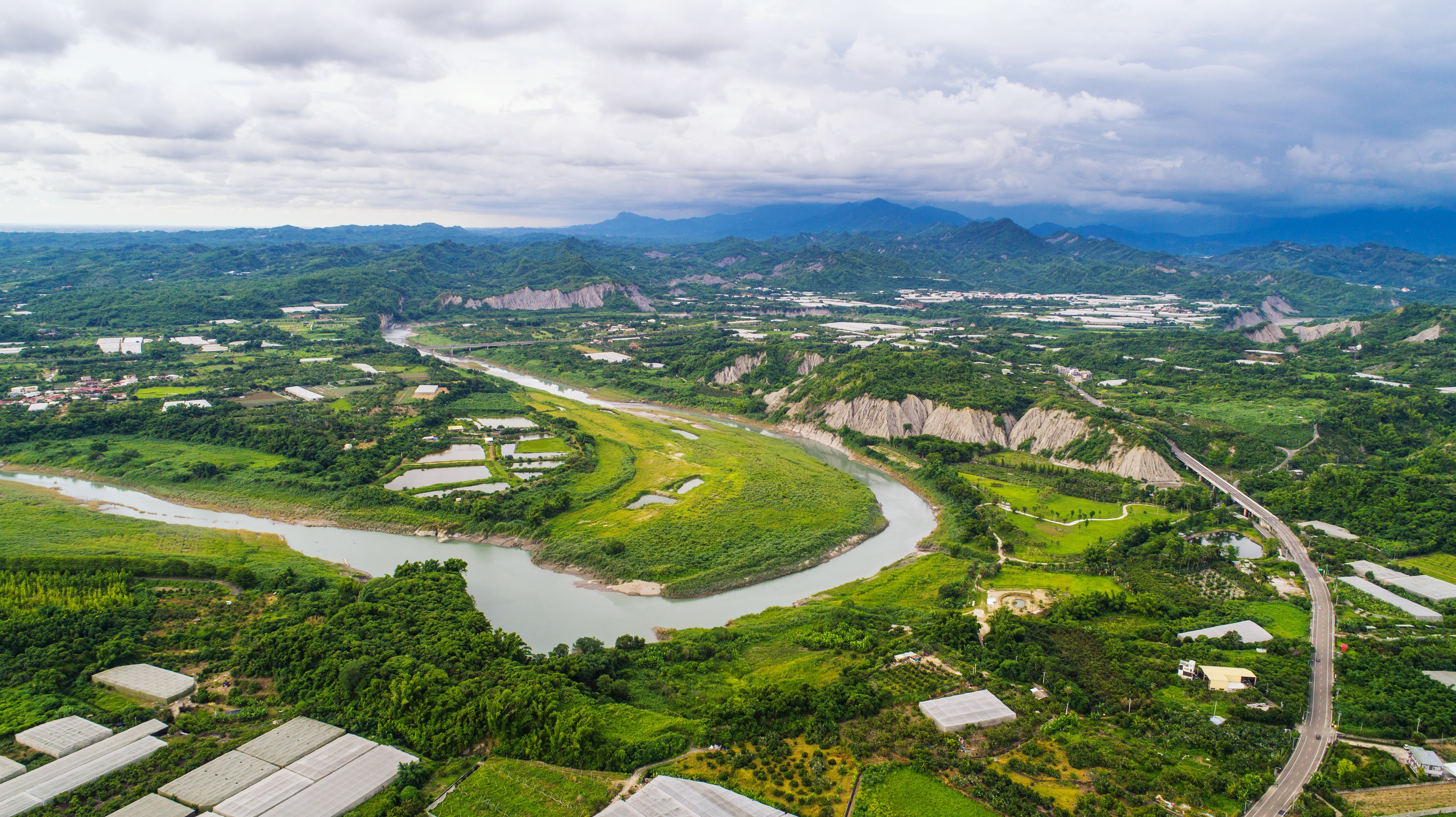

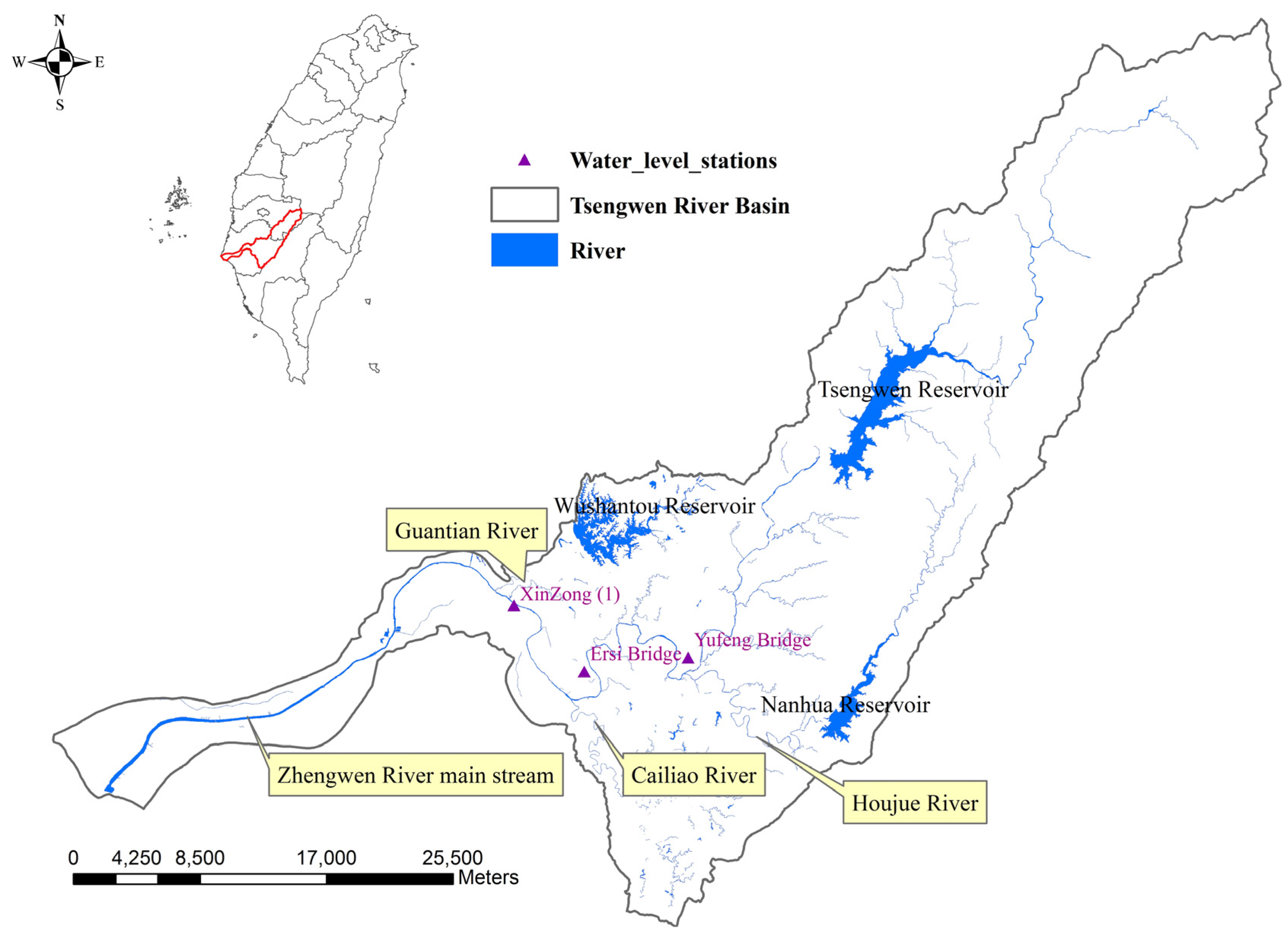
- Zengwen River basin
- Native name: 曾文溪 (Chinese)

Location
- Country: Taiwan

Physical characteristics
- Source
  - location: Alishan, Chiayi County
  - elevation: 2,609 m (8,560 ft)
- Mouth: Taiwan Strait
  - location: Tainan
  - coordinates: 23.050°N 120.067°E
  - elevation: 0 m (0 ft)
- Length: 146 km (91 mi)
- Basin size: 1,176.64 km^{2} (454.30 sq mi)
- Discharge
  - average: 74 m^{3}/s (2,600 cu ft/s)

Basin features
- Tributaries
  - left: Houku River

Zengwen River
- Chinese: 曾文溪
- Postal: Tsengwen
Transcriptions
Standard Mandarin
- Hanyu Pinyin: Zéngwén Xī
- Wade–Giles: Tseng-wen Hsi
Southern Min
- Hokkien POJ: Chan-bûn-khoe

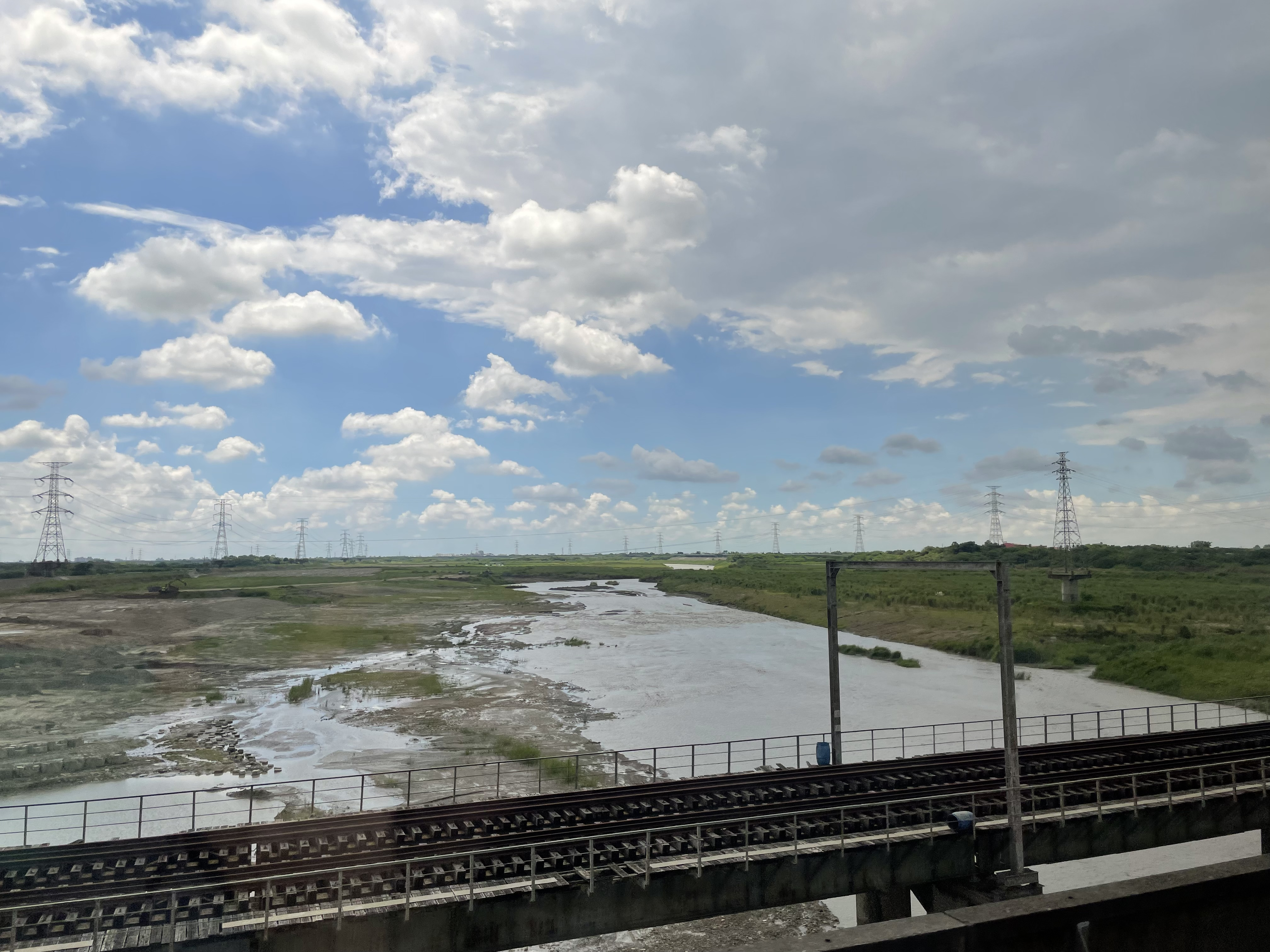
Zengwen River, located in Guantian District

The Zengwen River is the fourth longest river in Taiwan after the Zhuoshui River, Gaoping, and Tamsui, with a total length of about 146 km (91 mi). It flows through Tainan and Chiayi County.It is located in the southwestern part of the island.

== Names ==
Zéngwén is the pinyin romanization of the Mandarin pronunciation of the river's Chinese name 曾文溪. The river was formerly known as the Tsan-bun from the Hokkien pronunciation of the same name.

It was formerly known as the Taiwanfu from a former name of Tainan, when it was the headquarters of Qing administration on the island as a district of Fujian Province.

== Reservoir ==
The largest reservoir in Taiwan, Zengwen Reservoir, formed by Zengwen Dam, is located Located upstream of Zengwen River.

== National Park ==
Taijiang National Park encompasses parts of the Zengwen estuary as well as nearby coastal areas. The endangered black-faced spoonbills come every winter as migrants and inhabit downstream near the estuary, where many other waterfowls are also found. A conservation area has been set up to protect the spoonbills.

== See also ==
- List of rivers in Taiwan
