= Geography of Taiwan =

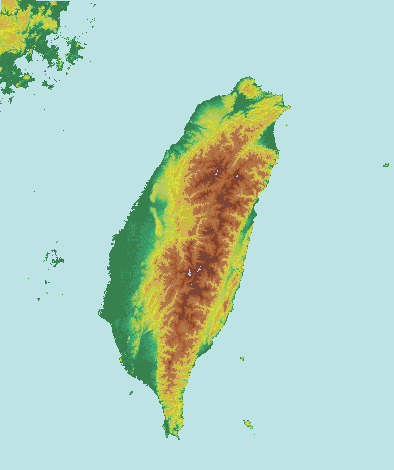
- Taiwan is mostly mountainous in the east, with gently sloping plains in the west. The Penghu Islands appear in the Taiwan Strait to the west of the main island.

- Region: East Asia
- Area: Ranked 134
  - Total: 36,197 km^{2} (13,976 sq mi)
  - Land: 89.7%
  - Water: 10.3%
- Coastline: 1,566.3 km (973.3 mi)
- Highest point: Yu Shan, 3,952 m (12,966 ft)
- Climate: Tropical marine
- Natural resources: Small deposits of coal, natural gas, limestone, marble, asbestos, arable land, rice
- Environmental issues: Air pollution, water pollution from industrial emissions and raw sewage, contamination of drinking water, trade in endangered species, low-level radioactive waste disposal
- Exclusive economic zone: 83,231 km^{2} (32,136 mi^{2})

Taiwan, officially the Republic of China (ROC), is a country in East Asia comprising primarily the island of Taiwan, which has an area of approximately 35,887 km^{2} (13,856 sq mi) and makes up approximately 99.14% of the ROC's territory. (Note: The ROC's territory has an area of approximately 36,197 km².) It lies about 180 km (112 mi) across the Taiwan Strait from the southeastern coast of mainland China's Fujian Province. The East China Sea is to the north of the island, the Philippine Sea to its east, the Luzon Strait directly to its south, and the South China Sea to its southwest. The ROC also controls a number of smaller islands, including the Penghu archipelago in the Taiwan Strait, Kinmen and Matsu in Fuchien near the mainland coast, as well as Pratas and Taiping in the South China Sea.

Geologically, the main island comprises a tilted fault block, characterized by the contrast between the eastern two-thirds, consisting mostly of five rugged mountain ranges running parallel to the east coast, and the flat to gently rolling plains of the western third, where the majority of the population resides. Several peaks exceed 3,500 m in height – the highest, Yu Shan at 3,952 m (12,966 ft), makes Taiwan the world's fourth-highest island. The tectonic boundary that formed these ranges remains active, and the island experiences many earthquakes, some of them highly destructive. There are also many active submarine volcanoes in the Taiwan Straits.

The climate ranges from tropical in the south to subtropical in the north, and is governed by the East Asian monsoon. On average, four typhoons strike the main island each year. The heavily forested eastern mountains provide a habitat for a diverse range of wildlife, while human land use in the western and northern lowlands is intensive.

== Physical boundaries ==
The total land area of Taiwan is 36,197 km^{2} (13,976 sq mi), slightly larger than Belgium. It has a coastline of 1,566.3 km (973.3 mi). The ROC claims an exclusive economic zone of 83,231 km^{2} (32,136 mi^{2}) with 200 nmi (370.4 km; 230.2 mi) and a territorial sea of 12 nmi (22.2 km; 13.8 mi).

The island of Taiwan, the largest of the archipelago, was known in the West until after World War II as Formosa, from the Portuguese Ilha Formosa ([ˌiʎɐ fuɾˈmɔzɐ]), "beautiful island". It is 394 km (245 mi) long and 144 km (89 mi) wide, and has an area of 35,808 km^{2} (13,826 sq mi). The northernmost point of the island is Cape Fugui in New Taipei's Shimen District. The central point of the island is in Puli Township, Nantou County. The southernmost point on the island is Cape Eluanbi in Hengchun Township, Pingtung County.

The main island is separated from the southeast coast of mainland China by the Taiwan Strait, which ranges from 220 km (140 mi) at its widest point to 130 km (81 mi) at its narrowest. Part of the continental shelf, the Strait is no more than 100 m (330 ft) deep, and has become a land bridge during glacial periods. Niushan Island in Nanlai village, Aoqian town, Pingtan County, Fuzhou, Fujian is the closest China (PRC)-administered island to the main island.

To the south, the main island is separated from the Philippine island of Luzon by the 250 km (155 mi)-wide Luzon Strait. The South China Sea lies to the southwest, the East China Sea to the north, and the Philippine Sea to the east.

Smaller islands of the archipelago include the Penghu islands in the Taiwan Strait 50 km (31 mi) west of the main island, with an area of 127 km^{2} (49 sq mi), the tiny islet of Xiaoliuqiu off the southwest coast, and Orchid Island and Green Island to the southeast, separated from the northernmost islands of the Philippines by the Bashi Channel. The islands of Kinmen and Matsu near the coast of Fujian across the Taiwan Strait have a total area of 180 km^{2} (69 sq mi); the Pratas and Taiping islets in the South China Sea are also administered by the ROC, but are not part of the Taiwanese archipelago.

== Geology ==
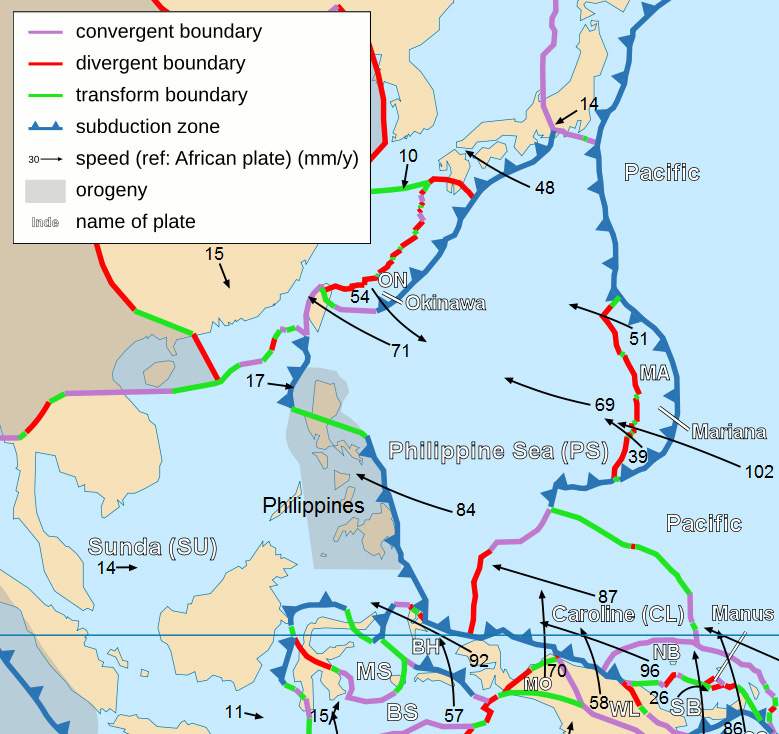
Taiwan lies on the western edge of the Philippine Plate.

The island of Taiwan was formed approximately 4 to 5 million years ago at a complex convergent boundary between the Philippine Sea Plate and the Eurasian Plate. In a boundary running the length of the island and continuing southwards in the Luzon Volcanic Arc (including Green Island and Orchid Island), the Eurasian Plate is sliding under the Philippine Sea Plate.

Most of the island comprises a huge fault block tilted to the west. The western part of the island, and much of the central range, consists of sedimentary deposits scraped from the descending edge of the Eurasian Plate. In the northeast of the island, and continuing eastwards in the Ryukyu Volcanic Arc, the Philippine Sea Plate slides under the Eurasian Plate.

The tectonic boundary remains active, and Taiwan experiences 15,000 to 18,000 earthquakes each year, of which 800 to 1,000 are noticed by people. The most catastrophic recent earthquake was the magnitude-7.3 Chi-Chi earthquake, which occurred in the centre of Taiwan on 21 September 1999, killing more than 2,400 people. On 4 March 2010 at about 01:20 UTC, a magnitude 6.4 earthquake hit southwestern Taiwan in the mountainous area of Kaohsiung County. Another major earthquake occurred on 6 February 2016, with a magnitude of 6.4. Tainan was damaged the most, with 117 deaths, most of them caused by the collapse of a 17-story apartment building.

== Terrain ==
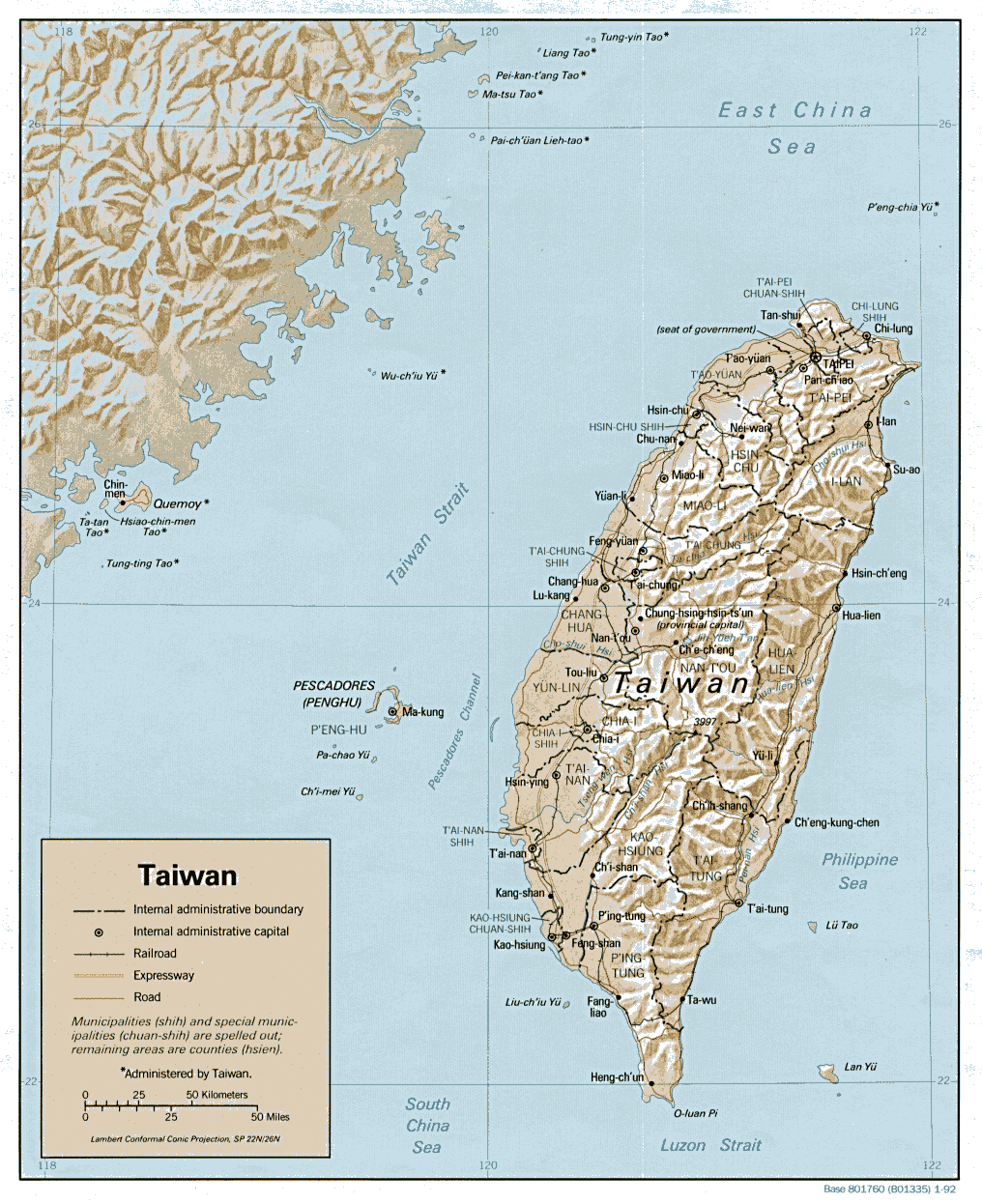
A relief map of Taiwan

The terrain in Taiwan is divided into two parts: the flat to gently rolling plains in the west, where 90% of the population lives, and the mostly rugged forest-covered mountains in the eastern two-thirds.

The eastern part of the island is dominated by five mountain ranges, each running from north-northeast to south-southwest, roughly parallel to the east coast of the island. As a group, they extend 330 km (210 mi) from north to south and average about 80 kilometres (50 mi) from east to west. They include more than two hundred peaks with elevations of over 3,000 m (9,800 ft).

The Central Mountain Range extends from Su'ao in the northeast to Eluanbi at the southern tip of the island, forming a ridge of high mountains and serving as the island's principal watershed. The mountains are predominantly composed of hard rock formations resistant to weathering and erosion, although heavy rainfall has deeply scarred the sides with gorges and sharp valleys. The relative relief of the terrain is usually extensive, and the forest-clad mountains with their extreme ruggedness are almost impenetrable. The east side of the Central Mountain Range is the steepest mountain slope in Taiwan, with fault scarps ranging in height from 120 to 1,200 m (390 to 3,900 ft). Taroko National Park, on the steep eastern side of the range, has good examples of mountainous terrain, gorges and erosion caused by a swiftly flowing river.

The East Coast Mountain Range extends down the east coast of the island from the mouth of the Hualien River in the north to Taitung County in the south, and chiefly consist of sandstone and shale. It is separated from the Central Range by the narrow Huatung Valley, at an altitude of 120 m (390 ft). Although Hsinkangshan (新港山), the highest peak, reaches an elevation of 1,682 m (5,518 ft), most of the range is composed of large hills. Small streams have developed on the flanks, but only one large river cuts across the range. Badlands are located at the western foot of the range, where the ground water level is the lowest and rock formations are the least resistant to weathering. Raised coral reefs along the east coast and the frequent occurrences of earthquakes in the rift valley indicate that the fault block is still rising.

The ranges to the west of the Central range are divided into two groups separated by the Sun Moon Lake Basin in the centre of the island. The Dadu and Zhuoshui Rivers flow from the western slopes of the Central Range through the basin to the west coast of the island.

The Xueshan Range lies to the northwest of the Central Mountain Range, beginning at Sandiaojiao, the northeast tip of the island, and gaining elevation as it extends southwest towards Nantou County. Xueshan, the main peak, is 3,886 m (12,749 ft) high.

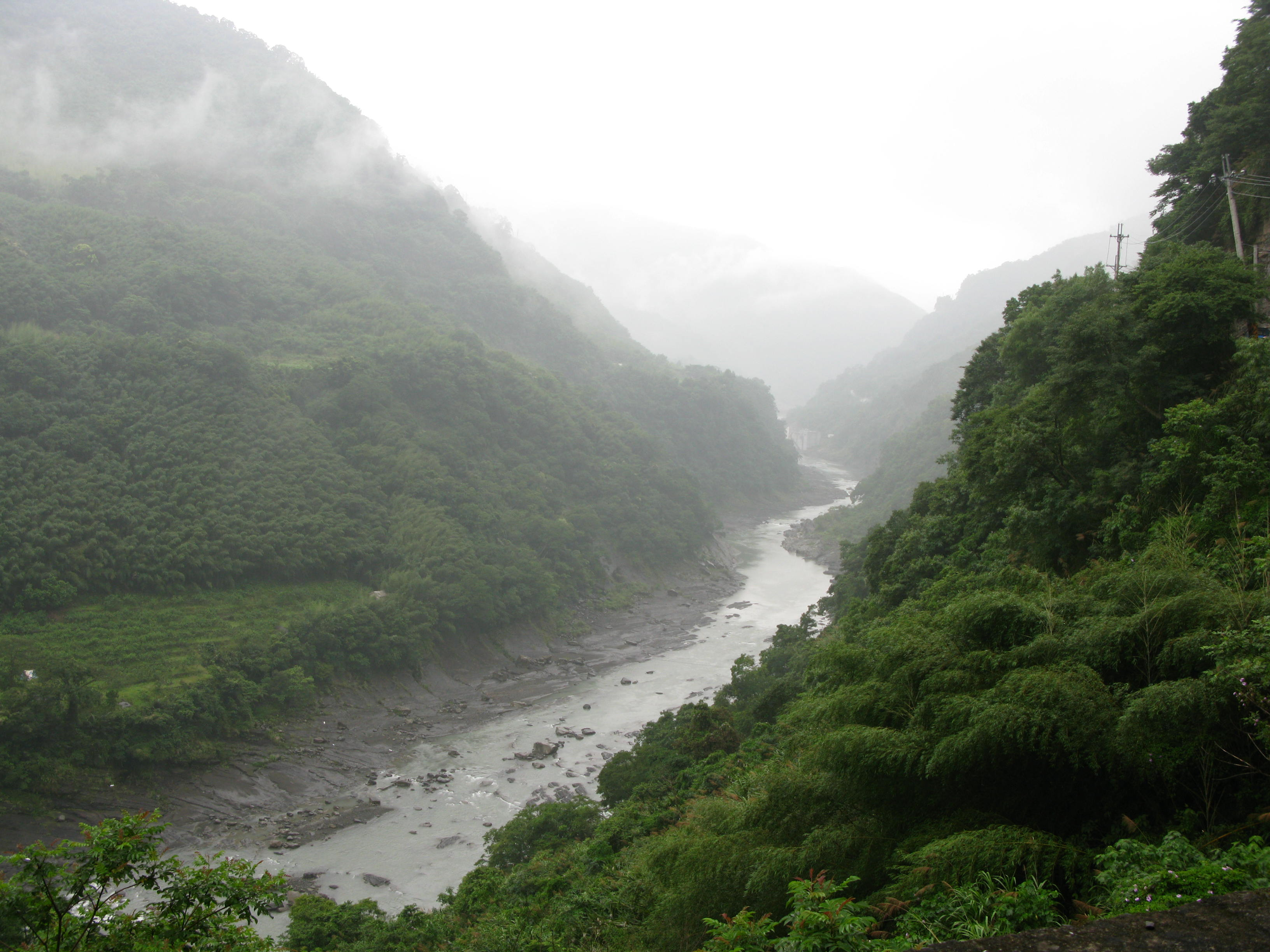
The Sanguang River in northwestern Taiwan

The Yushan Range runs along the southwestern flank of the Central Range. It includes the island's tallest peak, the 3,952 m (12,966 ft) Yu Shan ('Jade Mountain') which makes Taiwan the world's fourth-highest island, and is the highest point in the western Pacific region outside of the Kamchatka Peninsula, New Guinea Highlands and Mount Kinabalu.

The Alishan Range lies west of the Yushan Range, across the valley of the south-flowing Kaoping River. The range has major elevations between 1,000 and 2,000 m (3,300 and 6,600 ft). The main peak, Data Mountain (大塔山), towers 2,663 m (8,737 ft).

Below the western foothills of the ranges, such as the Hsinchu Hills and the Miaoli Hills, lie raised terraces formed of material eroded from the ranges. These include the Linkou Plateau, the Taoyuan Plateau and the Dadu Plateau. About 23% of Taiwan's land area consists of fertile alluvial plains and basins watered by rivers running from the eastern mountains. Over half of this land lies in the Chianan Plain in southwest Taiwan, with lesser areas in the Pingtung Plain, Taichung Basin and Taipei Basin. The only sizable plain on the east coast is the Yilan Plain in the northeast.

== Climate ==
Köppen climate classification of Taiwan

The island of Taiwan lies across the Tropic of Cancer, and its climate is influenced by the East Asian monsoon. Northern Taiwan has a humid subtropical climate, with substantial seasonal variation of temperatures, while parts of central and most of southern Taiwan have a tropical monsoon climate where seasonal temperature variations are less noticeable, with temperatures typically varying from warm to hot. During the winter (November to March), the northeast experiences steady rain, while the central and southern parts of the island are mostly sunny. The summer monsoon (from May to October) accounts for 90% of the annual precipitation in the south, but only 60% in the north. The average rainfall is approximately 2,600 mm per year.

Typhoons are most likely to strike between July and October, with on average about four direct hits per year. Intensive rain from typhoons often leads to disastrous mudslides.

Climate change in Taiwan has caused temperatures to rise by 1.4 degrees Celsius in the last 100 years. Sea level rise around Taiwan is occurring at twice the global rate. The government pledged to reduce emissions by 20% in 2030 and 50% in 2050, compared to 2005 levels.

Taipei (humid subtropical)

Climate chart (precipitation, max. and min. temperature)
J	F	M	A	M	J	J	A	S	O	N	D
83 19 14	170 20 14	180 22 16	178 26 19	235 29 22	326 32 25	245 34 26	322 34 26	361 31 25	149 28 22	83 24 19	73 21 16
- █ Average max. and min. temperatures in °C
- █ Precipitation totals in mm
- Source: Central Weather Bureau
Imperial conversion
J	F	M	A	M	J	J	A	S	O	N	D
3.3 66 57	6.7 67 58	7.1 72 60	7 78 66	9.2 85 72	13 90 76	9.6 94 79	13 93 79	14 88 77	5.9 82 72	3.3 76 67	2.9 69 60
- █ Average max. and min. temperatures in °F
- █ Precipitation totals in inches

Taichung (dry-winter humid subtropical)

Climate chart (precipitation, max. and min. temperature)
J	F	M	A	M	J	J	A	S	O	N	D
36 22 13	88 22 14	94 25 16	135 28 20	225 30 23	343 32 24	246 33 25	317 33 25	98 32 24	16 30 22	19 27 18	26 24 14
- █ Average max. and min. temperatures in °C
- █ Precipitation totals in mm
- Source: Central Weather Bureau
Imperial conversion
J	F	M	A	M	J	J	A	S	O	N	D
1.4 72 55	3.5 72 57	3.7 76 61	5.3 82 67	8.9 86 73	13 89 76	9.7 91 77	12 91 77	3.9 89 75	0.6 86 71	0.7 81 65	1 74 58
- █ Average max. and min. temperatures in °F
- █ Precipitation totals in inches

Kaohsiung (tropical savanna)

Climate chart (precipitation, max. and min. temperature)
J	F	M	A	M	J	J	A	S	O	N	D
16 24 16	21 25 17	39 27 19	70 29 22	197 31 25	415 32 26	391 32 26	417 32 26	242 31 26	43 30 24	19 28 21	16 25 17
- █ Average max. and min. temperatures in °C
- █ Precipitation totals in mm
- Source: Central Weather Bureau
Imperial conversion
J	F	M	A	M	J	J	A	S	O	N	D
0.6 75 60	0.8 76 62	1.5 80 67	2.7 84 72	7.8 87 77	16 89 79	15 90 80	16 89 79	9.5 89 78	1.7 86 75	0.7 82 70	0.6 77 63
- █ Average max. and min. temperatures in °F
- █ Precipitation totals in inches

== Flora and fauna ==
Before extensive human settlement, the vegetation on Taiwan ranged from tropical rainforest in the lowlands through temperate forests, boreal forest and alpine plants with increasing altitude.

Most of the plains and low-lying hills of the west and north of the island have been cleared for agricultural use since the arrival of the Chinese immigrants during the 17th and 18th century. However the mountain forests are very diverse, with several endemic species such as Formosan cypress (Chamaecyparis formosensis) and Taiwan fir (Abies kawakamii), while the camphor laurel (Cinnamomum camphora) was once also widespread at lower altitudes.

Over 4000 species of plants are indigenous to Taiwan, with over 1000 of them found nowhere else in the world.

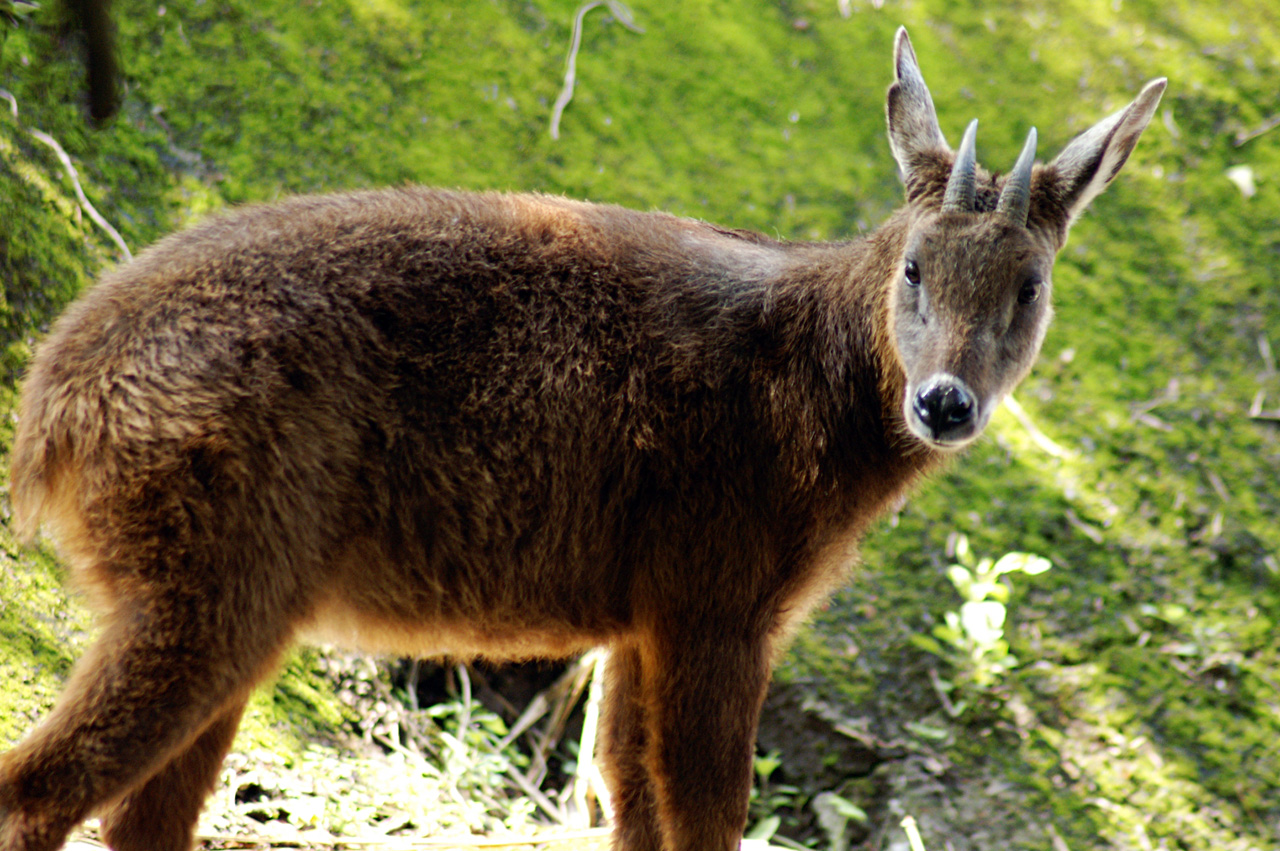
Formosan serow

Before the country's industrialization, the mountainous areas held several endemic animal species and subspecies, such as the Swinhoe's pheasant (Lophura swinhoii), Taiwan blue magpie (Urocissa caerulea), the Formosan sika deer (Cervus nippon taiwanensis or Cervus nippon taiouanus) and the Formosan landlocked salmon (Oncorhynchus masou formosanus). A few of these are now extinct, and many others have been designated endangered species. Taiwan had relatively few carnivores, 11 species in total, of which the Formosan clouded leopard is likely extinct and the otter is restricted to Kinmen island. The largest carnivore is the Formosan black bear (Selanarctos thibetanus formosanus), a rare and endangered species.

Taiwan is a centre of bird endemism (see List of endemic birds of Taiwan).

Taiwan has 65 species of fireflies, the third highest density after Jamaica and Costa Rica. Fireflies are protected and their numbers are increasing, but they are threatened by climate change in the long term.

Nine national parks in Taiwan showcase the archipelago's diverse terrain, flora and fauna. Kenting National Park on the southern tip of Taiwan contains uplifted coral reefs, moist tropical forest and marine ecosystems. Yushan National Park has alpine terrain, mountain ecology, forest types that vary with altitude, and remains of ancient roads. Yangmingshan National Park has volcanic geology, hot springs, waterfalls, and forest. Taroko National Park has a marble canyon, cliff, and fold mountains. Shei-Pa National Park has alpine ecosystems, geological terrain, and valley streams. Kinmen National Park has lakes, wetlands, coastal topography, flora and fauna-shaped island. Dongsha Atoll National Park has the Pratas reef atolls for integrity, a unique marine ecology, and biodiversity, and is a key habitat for the marine resources of the South China Sea and Taiwan Strait.

== Natural resources ==
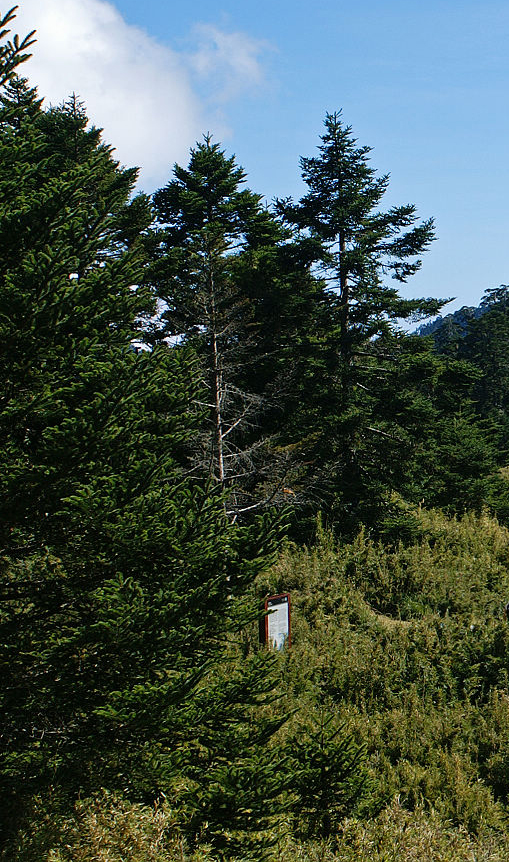
Taiwan fir (Abies kawakamii)

Natural resources on the islands include small deposits of gold, copper, coal, natural gas, limestone, marble, and asbestos. The island is 55% forest and woodland (mostly on the mountains) and 24% arable land (mostly on the plains), with 15% going to other purposes. 5% is permanent pasture and 1% is permanent crops.

Because of the intensive exploitation throughout Taiwan's history, the island's mineral resources (e.g. coal, gold, marble), as well as wild animal reserves (e.g. deer), have been virtually exhausted. Moreover, much of Taiwan's forestry resources, especially firs were harvested during Japanese rule for the construction of shrines and have only recovered slightly since then. To this day, forests do not contribute to significant timber production mainly because of concerns about production costs and environmental regulations.

=== Agriculture ===
The few natural resources with significant economic value remaining in Taiwan are agriculture-associated. Sugarcane and rice have been cultivated in western Taiwan since the 17th century. Camphor extraction and sugar refining played an important role in Taiwan's exports from the late 19th century through the first half of the 20th century. The importance of these industries declined mainly due to the reduction of international demand rather than the exhaustion of related natural resources.

Domestic agriculture (rice being the dominant kind of crop) and fisheries retain some importance. Still, they have been greatly challenged by foreign imports since Taiwan's accession to the World Trade Organization in 2002. Consequently, upon the decline of subsistence, Taiwan's agriculture now relies heavily on the marketing and export of specialty crops, such as bananas, guavas, lychees, bell fruits, and high-mountain tea.

=== Energy resources ===
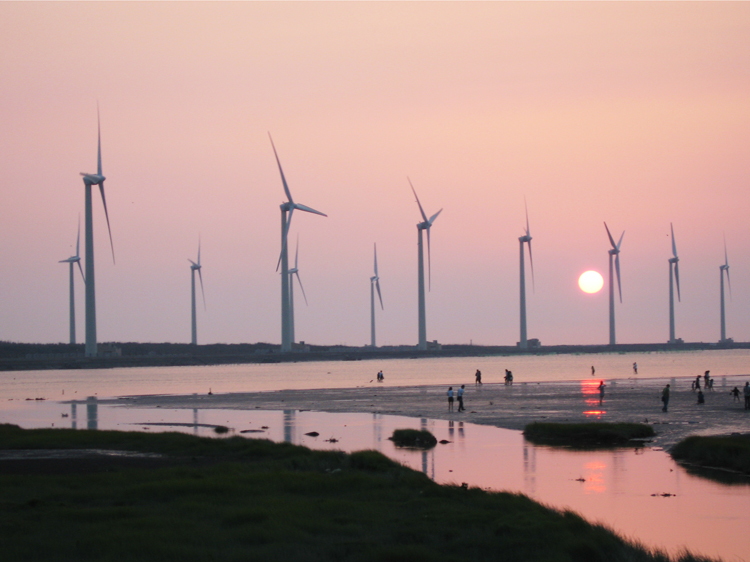
Wind turbines in Taichung

Taiwan has significant coal deposits and some insignificant petroleum and natural gas deposits. As of 2010, oil accounts for 49.0% of the total energy consumption. Coal comes next with 32.1%, followed by nuclear energy with 8.3%, natural gas (indigenous and liquefied) with 10.2%, and energy from renewable sources with 0.5%. Taiwan has six nuclear reactors and two under construction. Nearly all oil and gas for transportation and power needs must be imported, making Taiwan particularly sensitive to fluctuations in energy prices. Taiwan is rich in wind energy resources, with wind farms both onshore and offshore, though limited land area favours offshore wind resources. By promoting renewable energy, Taiwan's government hopes to also aid the nascent renewable energy manufacturing industry, and develop it into an export market.

== Human geography ==
Population density map of Taiwan

Taiwan has a population of over 23 million, the vast majority of whom live in the lowlands near the western coast of the island. The island is highly urbanized, with nearly 9 million people living in the Taipei–Keelung–Taoyuan metropolitan area at the northern end, and over 2 million each in the urban areas of Kaohsiung and Taichung.

Taiwanese indigenous peoples comprise approximately 2% of the population, and now mostly live in the mountainous eastern part of the island. Most scholars believe their ancestors arrived in Taiwan by sea between 4000 and 3000 BC, most likely from southeastern China.

Han Chinese make up over 95% of the population. Immigrants from southern Fujian began to farm the area around modern Tainan and Kaohsiung from the 17th century, later spreading across the western and northern plains and absorbing the indigenous population of those areas. Hakka people from eastern Guangdong arrived later and settled the foothills further inland, but the rugged uplands of the eastern half of the island remained the exclusive preserve of the indigenous peoples until the early 20th century. A further 1.2 million people from throughout China entered Taiwan at the end of the Chinese Civil War in 1949.

=== Environmental issues ===
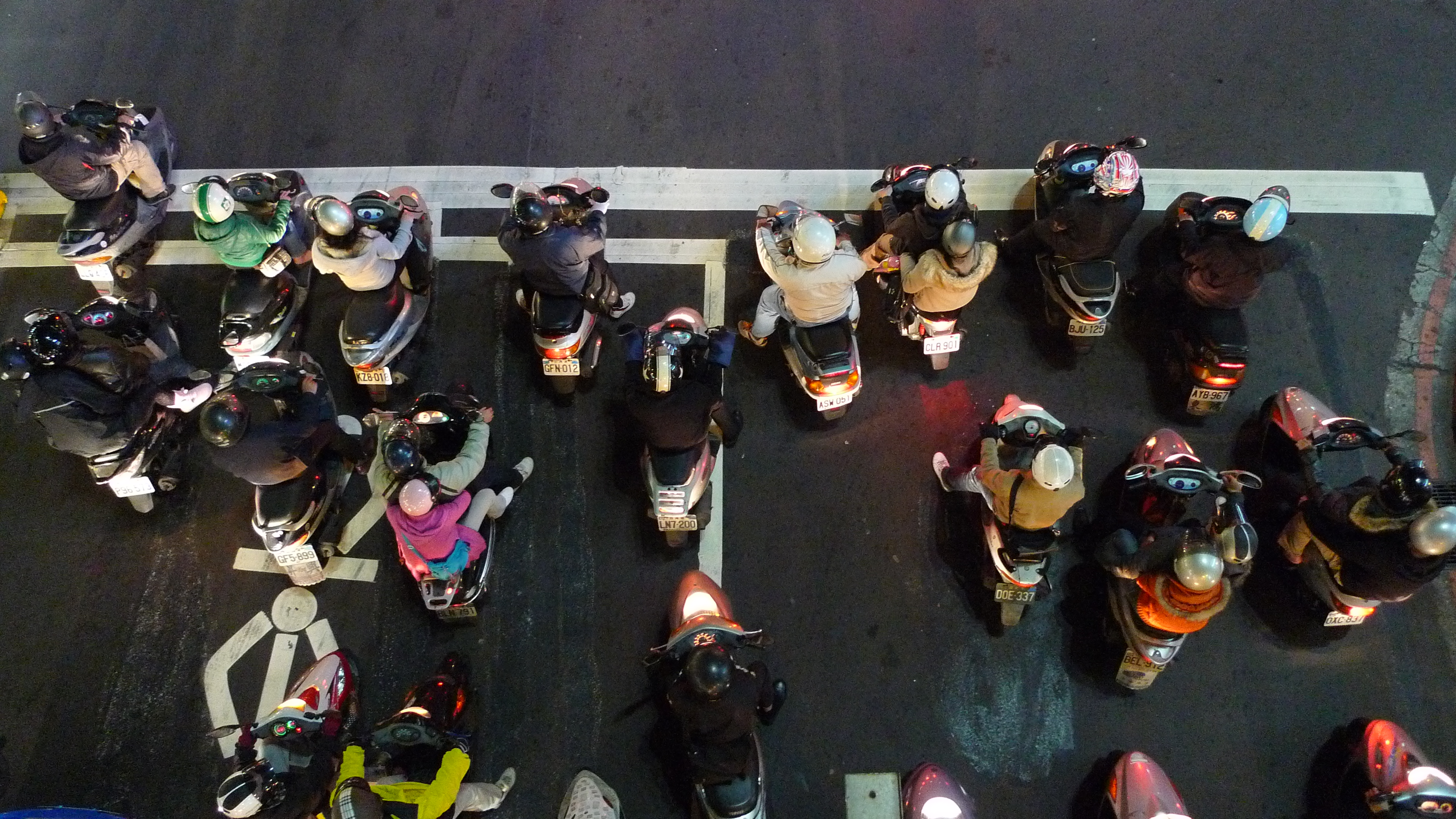
Motor scooters are a very common means of transportation in Taiwan and contribute to urban air pollution.

Some areas in Taiwan with high population density and many factories are affected by heavy pollution. The most notable areas are the southern suburbs of Taipei and the western stretch from Tainan to Lin Yuan, south of Kaohsiung. By the late 20th century, Taipei suffered from extensive vehicle and factory air pollution, but after the government required mandatory use of unleaded petrol and established the Environmental Protection Administration in 1987 to regulate air quality, the air quality of Taiwan has improved dramatically. Motor scooters, especially older or cheaper two-stroke versions, which are ubiquitous in Taiwan, contribute disproportionately to urban air pollution. The Taichung Power Plant also contributes significantly to air pollution, producing more CO_{2} than the country of Switzerland.

Other environmental issues include water pollution from industrial emissions and raw sewage, contamination of drinking water supplies, trade in endangered species, and low-level radioactive waste disposal. Though regulation of sulfate aerosol emissions from petroleum combustion is becoming stringent, acid rain remains a threat to the health of residents and forests. Atmospheric scientists in Taiwan estimate that more than half of the pollutants causing Taiwan's acid rain are carried from China by monsoon winds.

Taiwan historically had a serious problem with the illegal dumping of household and industrial waste which became so severe that Taiwan was known as "garbage island". This high level of pollution led to civil and government action, by 2022 the recycling rate was one of the highest in the world at 55%. Community activism was key to this change along with innovations such as garbage trucks which play music.

Illegal extraction by Chinese sand dredging vessels has caused significant damage to the marine environment of Taiwan's outlying areas. The Taiwan Banks are a particularly hard hit target. Bottom trawling is a controversial practice due to the environmental damage it causes. Bottom trawlers with a tonnage under 50 are restricted from trawling within 5 km of shore and those over 50 tons are restricted from trawling within 12 km of shore. In 2023 the maximum penalty for ocean pollution was raised from US$48,820 to US$3.25 million.
