= Shihmen Dam =

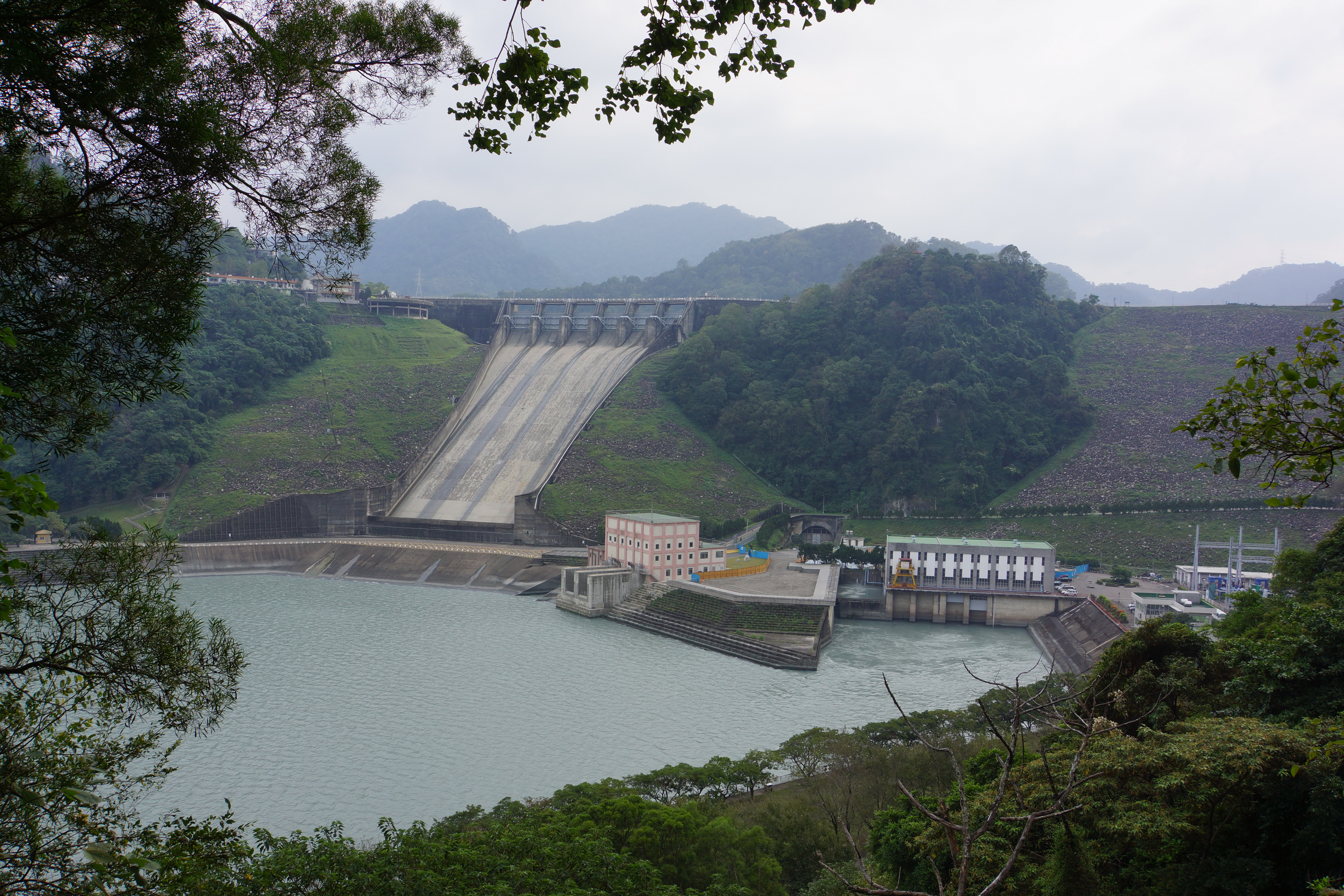
- View from below the dam, showing the main rock fill dam (right) and the spillway.
- Interactive map of Shihmen Dam
- Official name: 石門水庫
- Location: Fuxing, Taoyuan City, Taiwan
- Coordinates: 24°48′38″N 121°14′39″E
- Construction began: July 1955; 71 years ago
- Opening date: June 14, 1964; 62 years ago
- Construction cost: NT$1.4 billion
- Owner: Taiwan Water Resources Agency

Dam and spillways
- Type of dam: Rolled rockfill
- Impounds: Dahan River
- Height: 133.1 m (437 ft)
- Length: 360 m (1,180 ft)
- Spillway type: Gated overflow
- Spillway capacity: 11,400 m^{3}/s (400,000 cu ft/s)

Reservoir
- Creates: Shihmen Reservoir
- Total capacity: 309,120,000 m^{3} (250,610 acre⋅ft) (nominal); 251,880,000 m^{3} (204,200 acre⋅ft) (1997)
- Catchment area: 763.4 km^{2} (294.8 mi^{2})
- Surface area: 8.0 km^{2} (2,000 acres)

Power Station
- Turbines: 2x 45 MW
- Installed capacity: 90 MW
- Annual generation: 200 million KWh

Shihmen Dam (Chinese: 石門水庫; lit. 'Stone Gate Dam'; also spelled Shimen or Shihman) is a major rock fill dam across the Dahan River in northern Taoyuan City. It forms the Shihmen Reservoir (石門水庫), Taiwan's third largest reservoir or artificial lake. It provides irrigation in Taoyuan, flood control for the Taipei Basin, and hydroelectricity and domestic water supply for more than three million people in northern Taiwan.

Completed in 1964 after nine years of construction, Shihmen was Taiwan's first multi-purpose water project and a major step towards the island's economic independence after World War II. Year-round water releases from the dam enabled additional rice harvests and doubled Taoyuan's annual agricultural output, while the reservoir became a tourist destination due to its scenery and plentiful fisheries. However, the project was criticized for its high cost and its impact on local communities, as more than 2,000 people were displaced to make way for the reservoir.

Like some other reservoirs in Taiwan, Shihmen has suffered from sedimentation, reducing its capacity by over a third. Efforts to reduce the rate of sediment accumulation, including dredging, check dam construction and watershed restoration work, have had a limited effect. This has diminished both the Shihmen Dam's capability to contain floods and provide water during droughts.

== History ==
=== Background ===
The Dahan River is the main river in northwestern Taiwan and is one of two tributaries that join in Taipei to form the Tamsui, Taiwan's largest river system. Originating in the Xueshan Range, the river begins life as a fast-flowing mountain stream prone to flooding during typhoons. The Dahan skirts, but does not cross, the Taoyuan Plateau, which lacks a reliable water supply of its own. The plateau has been farmed since 1680 using thousands of artificial ponds to capture rainfall; in 1928, when Taiwan was under Japanese rule, the Taoyuan Canal was dug to divert water from the Dahan (then known as the Takekan River) onto the plateau. River water enabled the irrigation of an additional 20,000 hectares (49,000 acres) of land in the Taoyuan area. Due to the limited storage capacity of the small Taoyuan ponds, there was often not enough water for irrigation in the November–April dry season, demonstrating the need for a large reservoir.

A dam at the "stone gates" (Shihmen), a deep canyon formed where the Dahan river exits the mountains, was proposed as early as 1938, but plans were dropped at the beginning of World War II with the strain on industrial resources. After the war, the Republic of China was faced with food shortages and a rapidly increasing population. By the 1960s, the annual population growth had reached 350,000. In order to improve its economic self-sufficiency, the government initiated the construction of Shihmen Dam, Taiwan's first multi-purpose water project. The Shihmen Development Commission was established to oversee the project. The initial budget for the dam was NT$1.4 billion, with approximately half of that as low-interest aid loans from the United States through the Agency for International Development.

=== Construction ===
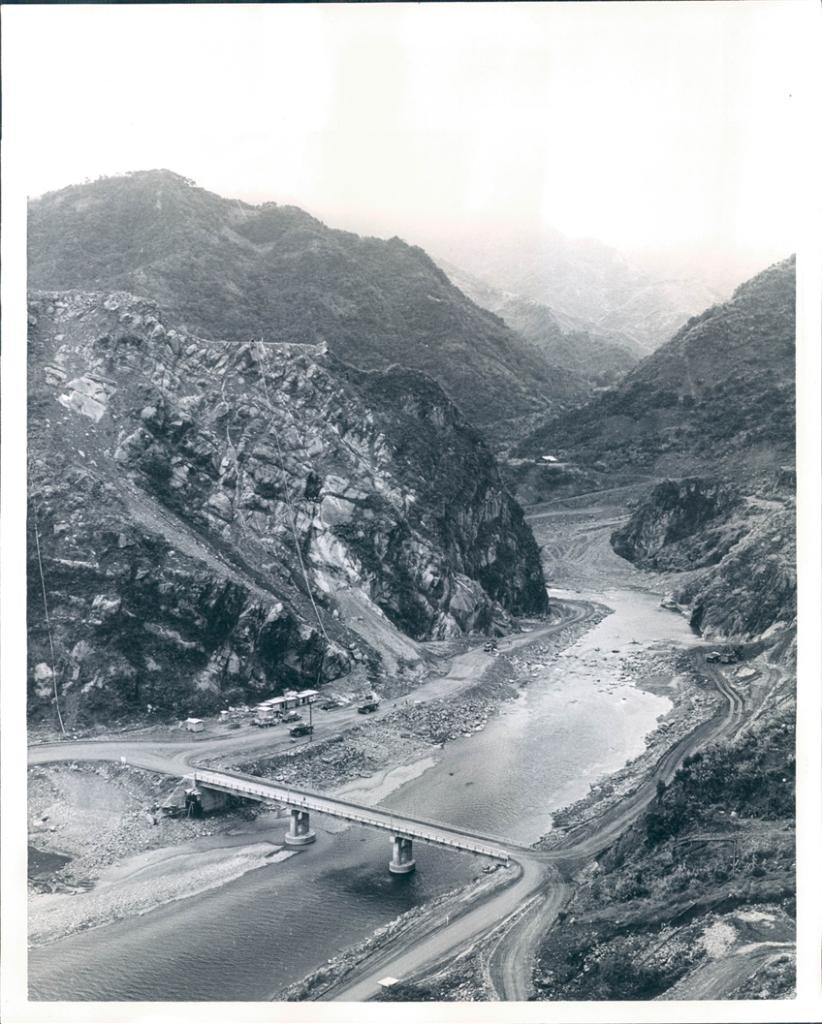
Shihmen Dam site before construction, looking upstream at the "stone gates".

Starting in July 1955, access roads and worker facilities were constructed at the dam site, and the area of the future reservoir was prepared to accommodate flooding. About 2,000 people (416 families) living in the Dahan River valley would be displaced by the project; they were relocated starting in 1956 to areas along Taiwan's northwest coast. Although the government built new homes, schools and other infrastructure as well as providing land compensation to families, the resettlement programme was the subject of bitter controversy.

The dam was designed by Tippetts-Abbett-McCarthy-Stratton, with construction overseen by Morrison-Knudsen (known previously for its work on Hoover Dam). Heavy construction began in late 1959 when large equipment arrived at the dam site. Although work was interrupted several times by typhoon flooding, the river was successfully diverted into a tunnel in December 1960. The concrete cofferdam, later to serve as the core of the dam, was finished in 1962; notably, it was the first use of roller-compacted concrete in dam construction. About 120 hectares (300 acres) of nearby farmland were purchased by the government to provide 6,675,000 cubic metres (235,700,000 ft^{3}) of earth and rock needed to build the dam.

With the dam only partially complete in May 1963, the diversion tunnel was plugged, allowing the reservoir to begin storing water. In July 1963, Typhoon Wendy struck Taiwan, causing massive flooding; the new reservoir was able to reduce the flood crest on the Dahan River by 25 percent. The embankment was topped out in June 1964, at a final cost of NT$ 4.85 billion. The dam was dedicated on June 14, 1964 by Vice President Chen Cheng, to a crowd of more than four thousand people. A total of 7,500 people were employed in the construction of the dam, with as many as 6,000 workers on the site at one time. Thirty-two people were killed during construction; out of 2,881 injured, 87 were left permanently disabled.

=== Later history ===
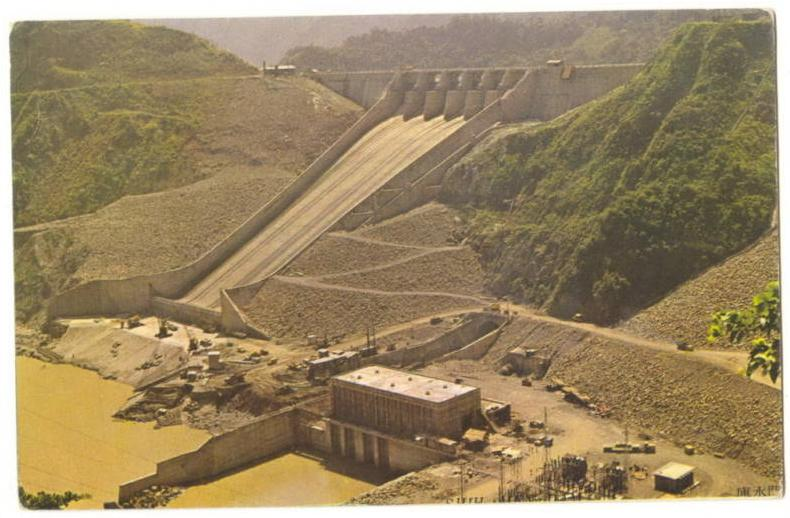
The spillway, nearing completion in 1964

Engineers estimated that the natural sedimentation rate would give the reservoir a useful life of at least 71 years without any sediment removal. However, just four months after the reservoir began filling, Typhoon Gloria struck Taiwan, and the resulting floods washed 19 million cubic metres (670 million ft^{3}) of sediment into the reservoir – taking 23 years off its expected lifespan. As the reservoir filled, it also inundated several historic landmarks, including the former summer villa of Chiang Kai-shek, the Amuping Stone Bridge and a nearby Earth God shrine.

Irrigation was the primary goal of the Shihmen reservoir; about 22,000 hectares (54,000 acres) of new farmland came into production after the dam was built, bringing the total to 57,000 hectares (140,000 acres). The annual crop was more than doubled due to an increased water supply for pre-existing farmland. Individual farmers' income rose by almost 20 percent. About 27 kilometres (17 mi) of canals were added to the existing irrigation system, including the new Shihmen Canal, bringing the total to 175 kilometres (109 mi), and a treatment plant with 30,000 tons per day capacity was constructed to provide municipal water supply. Despite the scale of the project, the increase in agricultural production was estimated to feed 500,000 people, or less than two years of population growth. The importance of the dam for irrigation has been decreasing since the 1990s as Taoyuan County saw significant urbanization; in the meantime, demand for cleaner domestic water has risen.

The government allocated NT$21 million to develop the Shihmen Reservoir as a recreational area. Boating facilities and about 31 kilometres (19 mi) of new roads were constructed to improve access to the reservoir. The reservoir would also be stocked with game fish, and its shores would eventually be developed with "temples, museums, monuments, pagodas, hostels and residences." After the dam was completed, it brought prosperity via tourism to this rural area, helping to diversify its economy from one solely reliant on agriculture. However, due to the project's high capital cost, the actual annual return on investment was only 1.5 percent: "It stands as an engineering monument of which the Chinese people may be proud. But it was purchased at far too high a cost in terms of tens of millions of dollars of alternative developmental opportunities foregone."

== Dam details ==
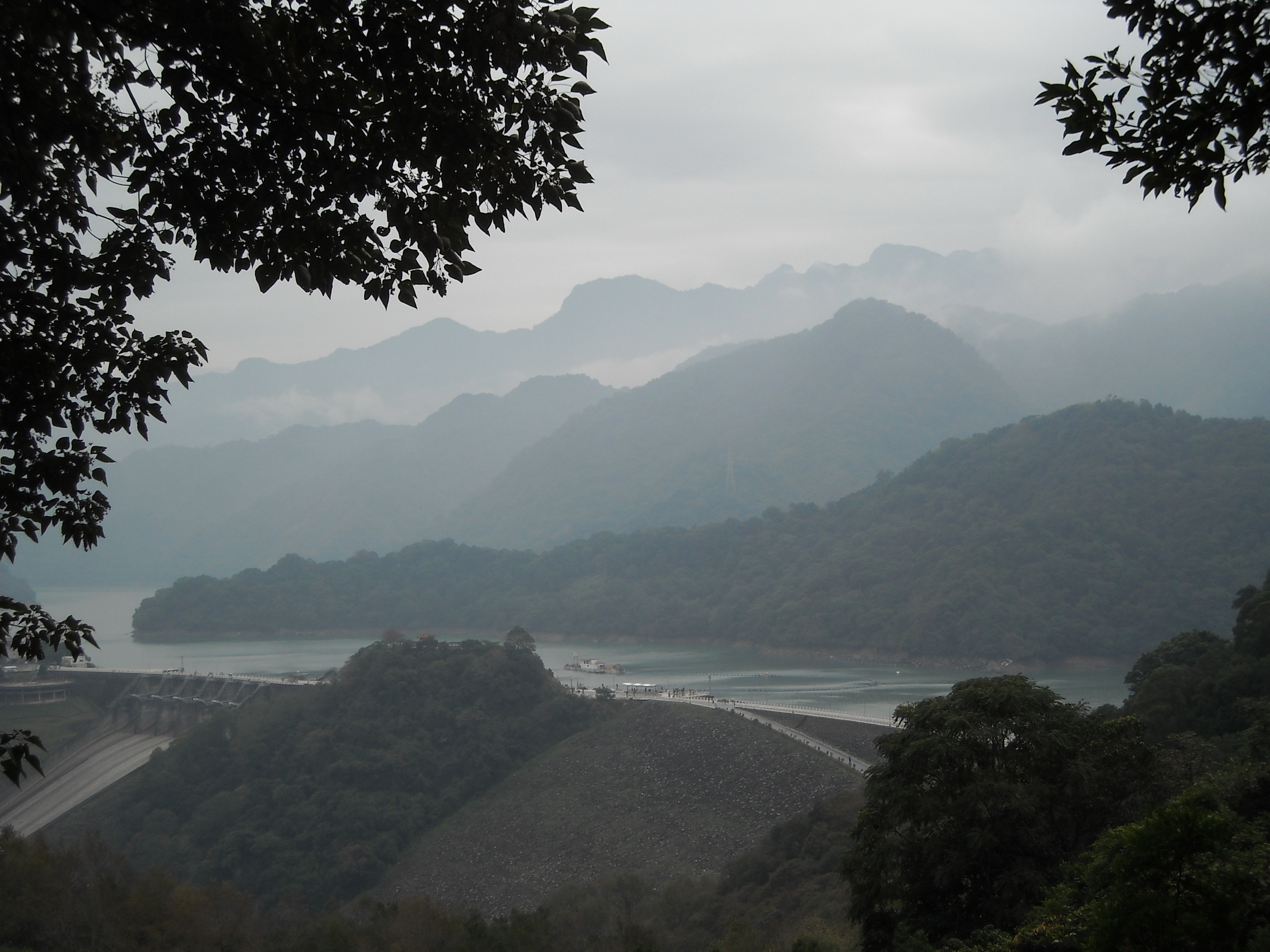
View from a nearby mountain, showing the main dam (center) and spillway (lower left).

=== Embankment and spillways ===
Shihmen Dam is a rolled rockfill embankment dam 133.1 metres (437 ft) high and 360 metres (1,180 ft) long, constructed over a 70-metre (230 ft) high concrete core. The main body of the dam contains some 7.06 million cubic metres (9.23 million yd^{3}) of material. At the crest, the dam is 11.5 metres (38 ft) wide, with an elevation of 252.1 metres (827 ft) above sea level. The normal water level is 245 metres (804 ft), with a maximum flood level of 249.7 metres (819 ft).

The concrete spillway is located to the east of the dam and is controlled by six radial gates, each 10 metres (33 ft) high and 14 metres (46 ft) wide. The maximum water release is 11,400 cubic metres per second (400,000 cu ft/s). There is also a river outlet works used for normal releases, with a capacity of 34 cubic metres per second (1,200 cu ft/s). The dam also has two additional flood tunnels which were completed in 1978, in order to allow faster evacuation of reservoir storage prior to typhoons. Each tunnel is 375.4 metres (1,232 ft) long, 1.372 metres (4.50 ft) in diameter, with a combined capacity of 2,400 cubic metres per second (85,000 cu ft/s).

=== Power station ===
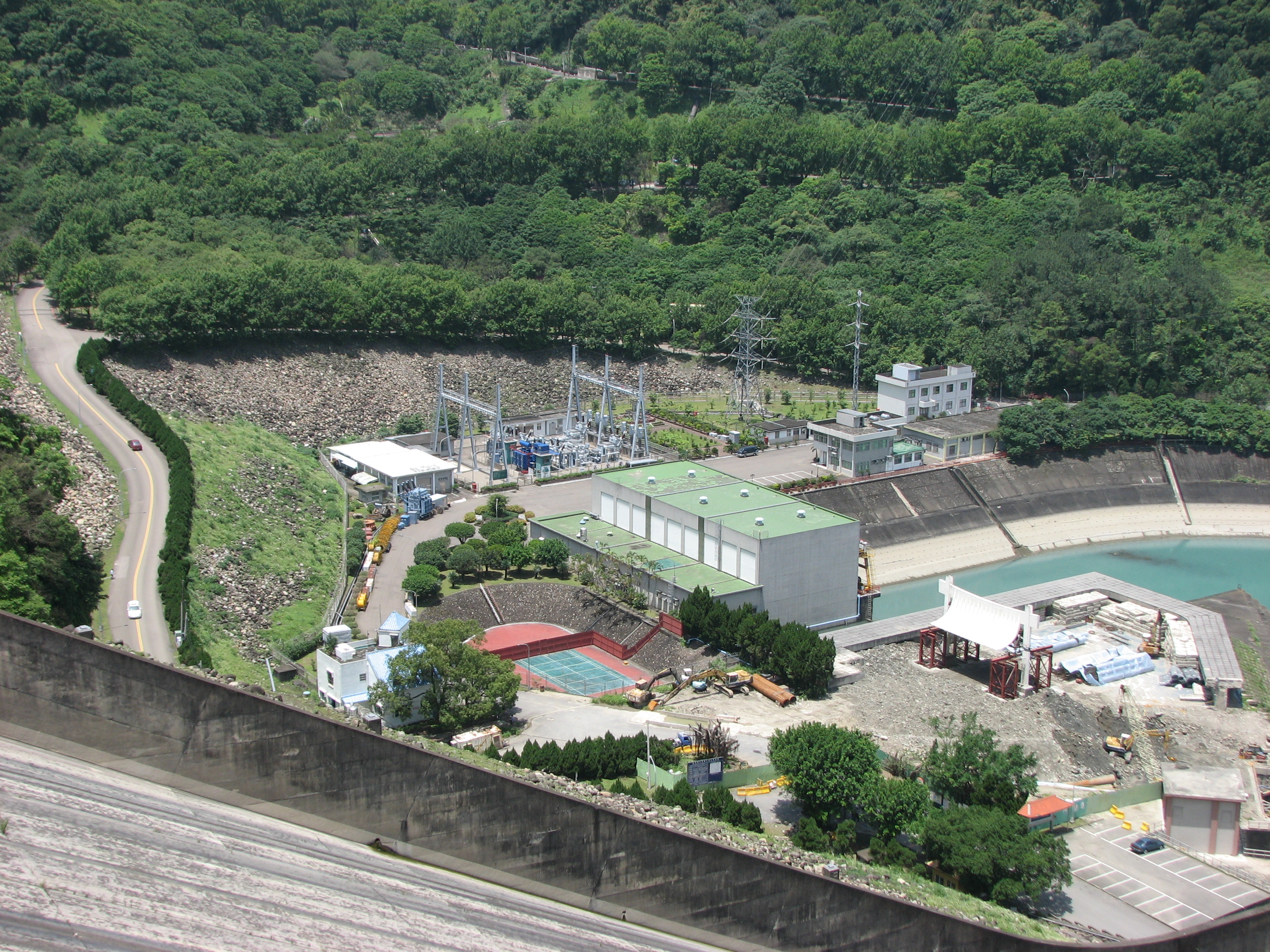
View across the spillway showing Shihmen Power Station

The dam's hydroelectric power station is located on the left bank of the Dahan River at the base of the dam. Two steel 4.57-metre (15.0 ft) diameter penstocks, each 318.8 metres (1,046 ft) long, feed water to two Francis turbines. The maximum water flow through the power plant is 137.2 cubic metres per second (4,850 cu ft/s). Each generator has a capacity of 45,000 kilowatts (KW), for a total capacity of 90,000 KW. The plant produces about 200 million kilowatt hours per year.

=== Reservoir ===
The impounded water behind the dam forms Shihmen Reservoir, one of Taiwan's largest reservoirs with a length of 16 kilometres (9.9 mi) and more than 800 hectares (2,000 acres) of water at full pool. The reservoir had an original total capacity of 309,120 megalitres (250,610 acre⋅ft), with an active or useful capacity of 251,780 ML (204,120 acre⋅ft). Sedimentation reduced the total storage capacity to 251,880 ML (204,200 acre⋅ft) by 1997 – a nearly 20 percent reduction – and the active capacity was decreased to 233,800 ML (189,500 acre⋅ft). As of a 2017 study, the total capacity had been reduced to 216,000 ML (175,000 acre⋅ft).

The Shihmen afterbay reservoir, located below the main dam, regulates the water release into the Dahan River and provides the intake point for the Taoyuan and Shihmen Canals. The afterbay is formed by a 317.5-metre (1,042 ft) long weir and can store up to 2,200,000 cubic metres (1,800 acre⋅ft). The headworks for the Taoyuan Canal have a capacity of 18.6 cubic metres per second (660 cu ft/s), and the Shihmen Canal can carry up to 18.4 cubic metres per second (650 cu ft/s).

=== Operations and usage ===
Water from Shihmen Dam is distributed to 28 districts in Taoyuan City, Hsinchu County and New Taipei, with a combined population of some 3.4 million people and more than 36,500 hectares (90,000 acres) of irrigated land. Each year, Shihmen furnishes 181.6 million m^{3} (147,200 acre feet) of water for irrigation and industrial uses and about 127.4 million m^{3} (103,300 acre feet) for residential use in downstream areas. In addition, an annual minimum river release of 299.6 million m^{3} (242,900 acre feet) is maintained to provide a baseflow in the lower Dahan River. About 386.3 million m^{3} (313,200 acre feet) of the aforementioned releases are utilized for hydroelectric generation. The dam's power station generates roughly 200 million kilowatt hours annually and is integral in meeting peaking power demands in northern Taiwan's electricity grid. Hydroelectric power releases peak in late July and August, largely because of air-conditioning usage in Taiwan's northern cities.

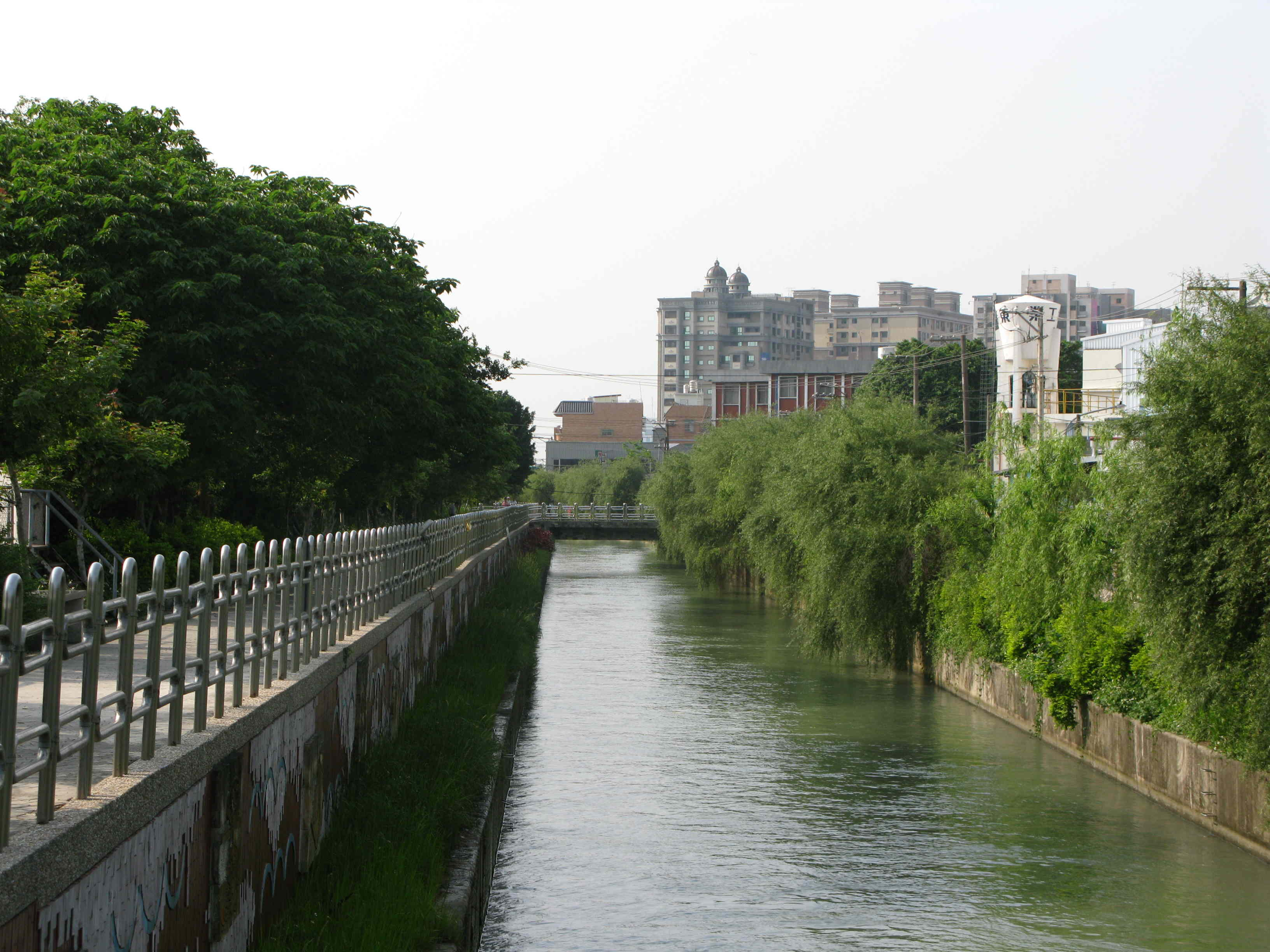
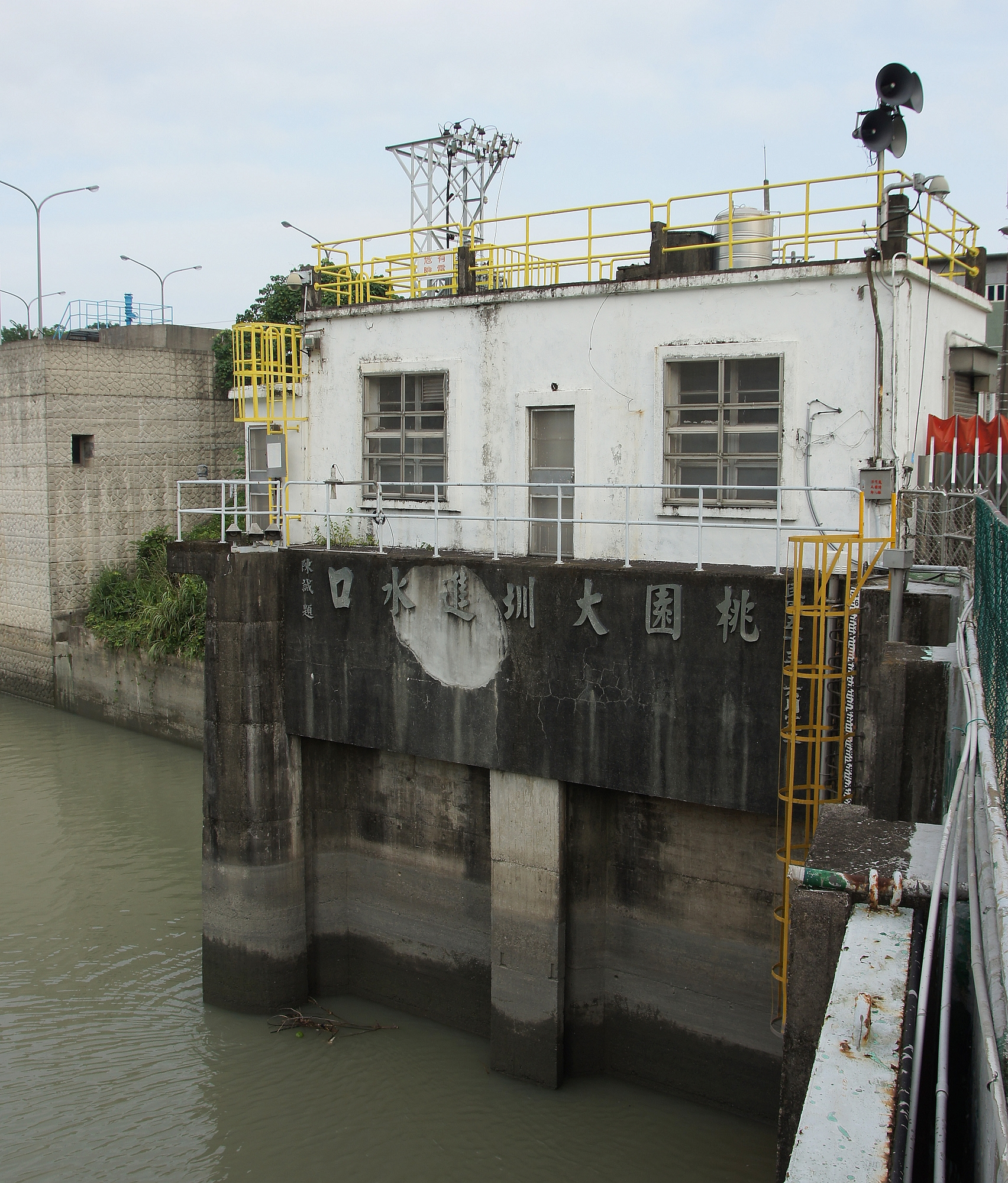
Taoyuan Canal (Left: In Taoyuan City; Right: Intake at Shihmen Afterbay Dam)

Shihmen is one of several key reservoirs in the Tamsui River system used to cut peak flood flows during typhoon events. Dam releases are coordinated with those from Feitsui Dam to the east in order to reduce the severity of flooding. However, sediment accumulation in the reservoir has reduced its effectiveness on large flooding events. As a result, the "frequency with which the Shih-men Dam discharges water down its spillway ranks first among Taiwan's reservoirs. The phrase 'the Shihmen Reservoir is releasing flood water' has become a euphemism for 'your fly is open'." Additionally, large flooding events can cause turbidity levels in the reservoir to increase by over 3,000 times of average, forcing authorities to shut down water supplies. This problem has been exacerbated by the increasing percentage of Shihmen water going to residential and industrial users, who generally demand clearer water than the agricultural users Shihmen was originally intended to supply.

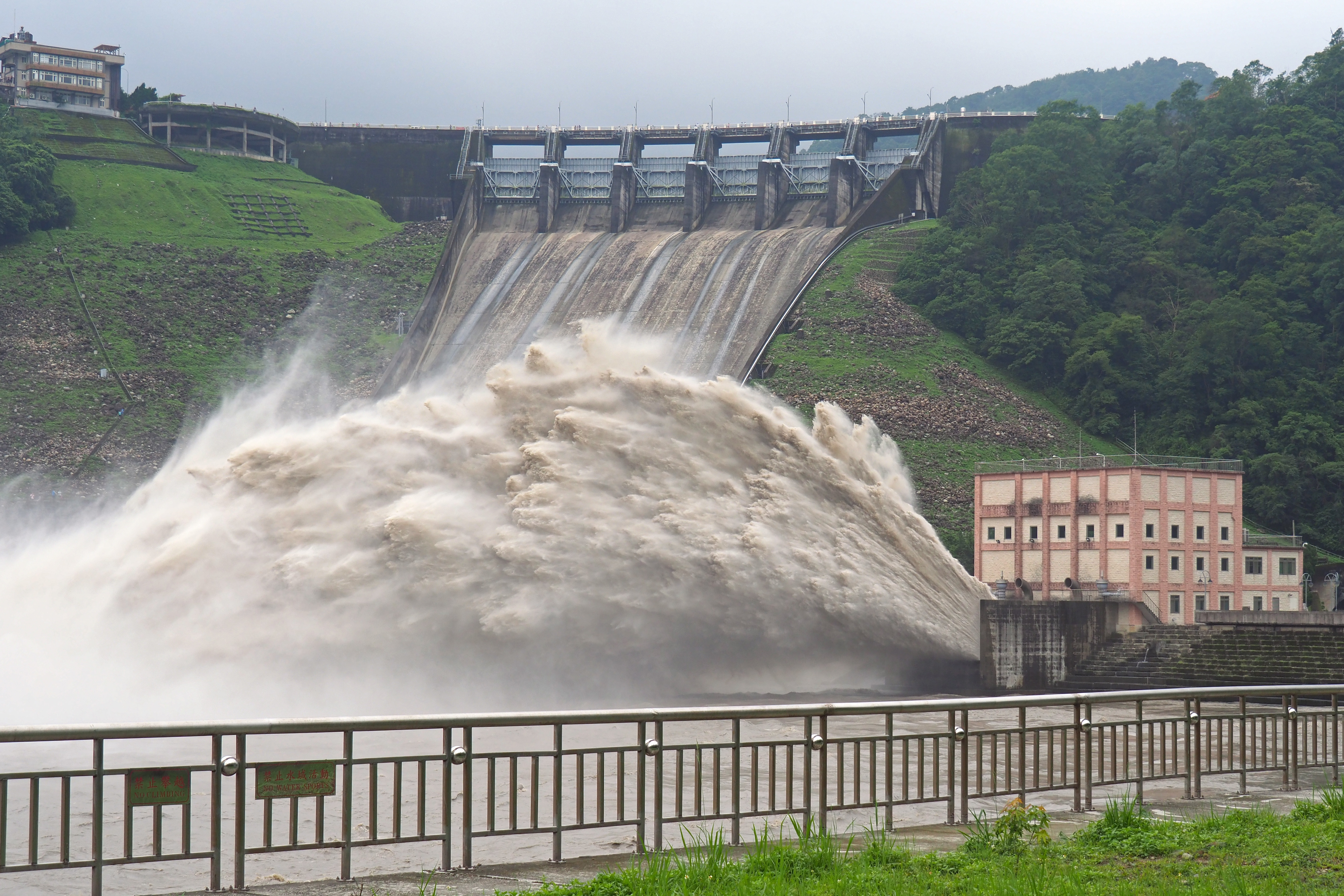
Flood release in June 2017

The reduction in storage capacity has also affected Shihmen's ability to provide water during droughts. Demand often exceeds stored water in Shihmen Reservoir during the dry season, forcing frequent water-supply cuts. For several weeks in 1994, the drought-stricken Shihmen Dam service area was limited to one day of running water in three. This has been further exacerbated by global climate change reducing the length of the rainy season in Taiwan, while increasing the intensity of rainfall when storms do strike the island. In 2015, Taiwan recorded its lowest winter rainfall since 1947, and the Shihmen reservoir fell to a record low of 24.5 percent of capacity, again forcing the government to enact water rationing.

Among the other benefits of the dam and reservoir is recreation. More than 160,000 tourists visit the dam each year, especially during floodwater releases. The reservoir, its surrounding recreation area and towns are visited by a further 1.7 million people each year. It is said that "after its grand opening to the public in 1964, the Shihmen Reservoir has remained one of the top spots on Taiwan's sight-seeing billboards". Recreational and commercial fishing on the reservoir produces about 80,000 kilograms (180,000 lb) of fish each year, generating an annual revenue of NT$29.33 million.

== Environmental issues ==
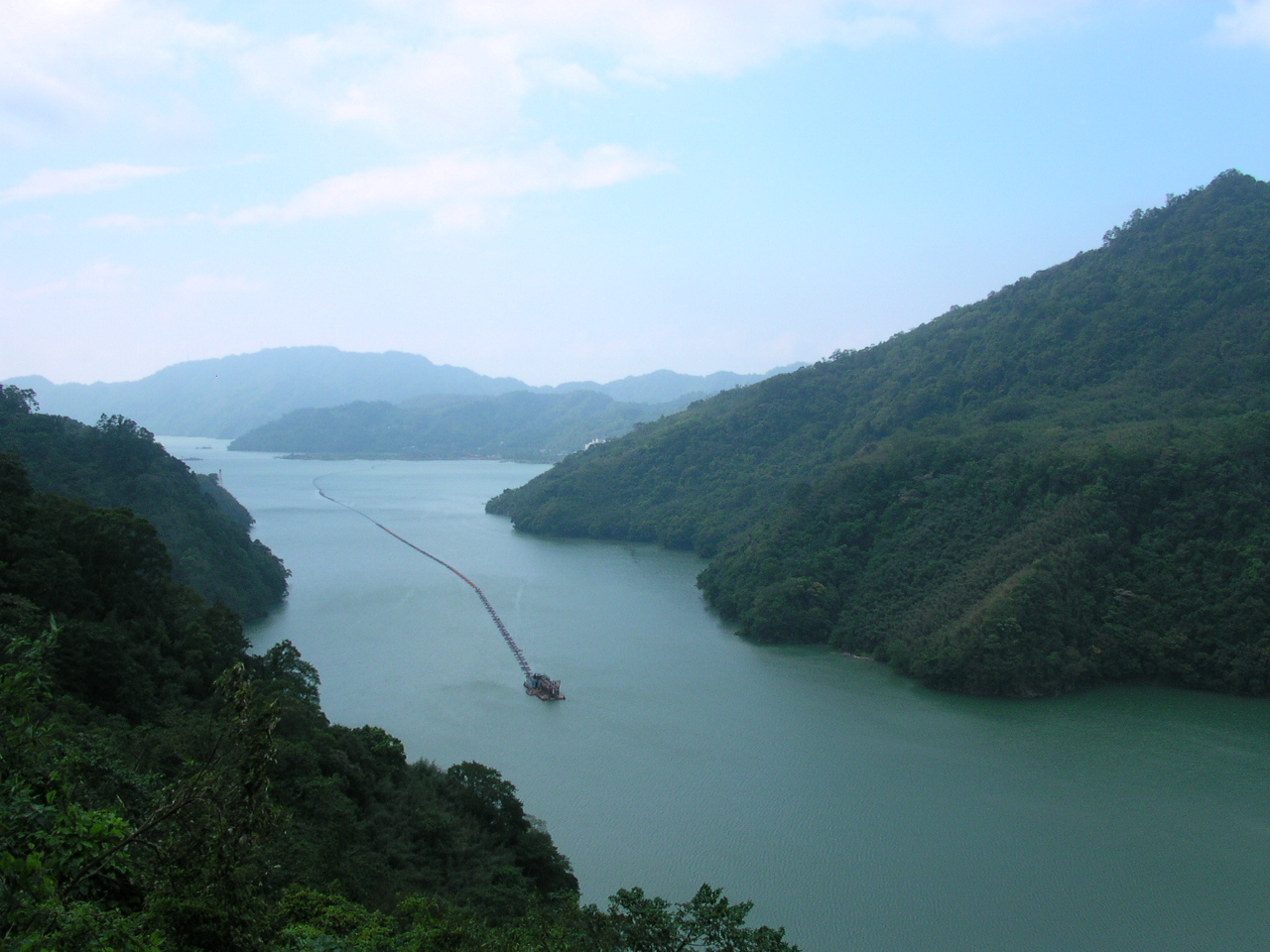
Shihmen Reservoir

Poor land use and construction practices in the catchment area of Shihmen Dam have contributed to a severe sedimentation problem in the reservoir. This sediment mainly comes from landslides and other erosion-related issues in the steep, rugged drainage basin, which have been exacerbated by deforestation, land-clearing for agriculture, and the opening of roads into mountainous areas. The reservoir, which originally had a maximum depth of over 100 metres (330 ft), is estimated to be no more than 40 metres (130 ft) deep today. The textbook The Hydraulics of Open Channel Flow by Hubert Chanson describes the dam as having "become a vast sediment trap with an inappropriate storage capacity to act as a flood control or water supply reservoir."

In 1981 it was estimated that 2.9 million tonnes of sediment flow into the reservoir each year, or a watershed erosion rate of 3,789 tonnes/km^{2}. According to a 2017 Taipei Times report, the amount of sediment flowing into the reservoir was 3.42 million tonnes per year. About 1.17 million tonnes were sluiced through the dam's outlets and another 900,000 tonnes were removed by excavation and dredging. The government has proposed to construct a sediment bypass tunnel, which would prevent another 640,000 tonnes from entering the reservoir. This technology has already been employed at reservoirs in Japan and Switzerland, and would essentially allow river water to be diverted around the reservoir instead of flowing into it during periods of high sediment runoff, such as after typhoons.

=== Sediment prevention projects ===
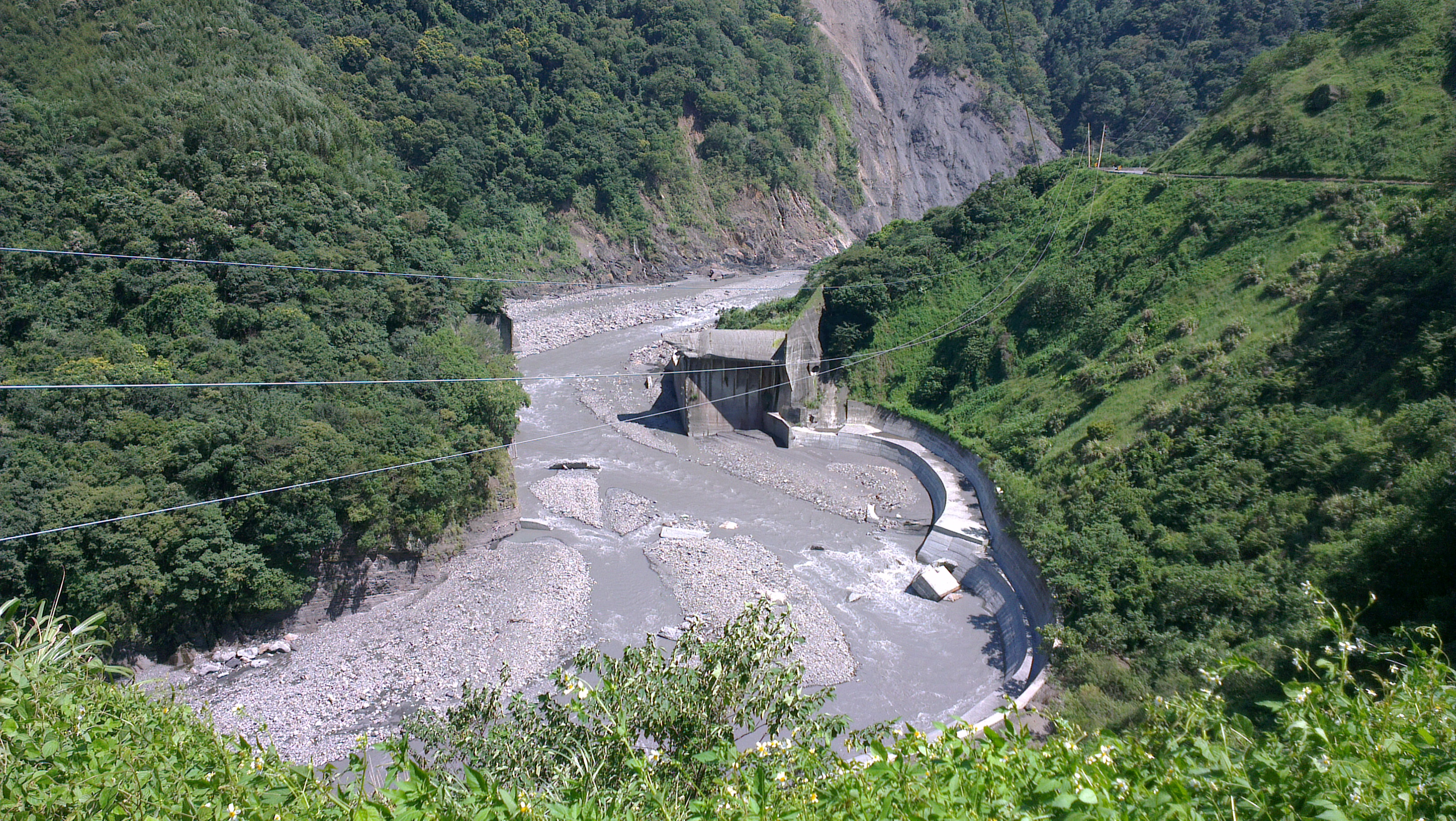
The destroyed Baling Dam, showing severe riverbed erosion typical in the watershed

A number of measures have been taken to try and reduce the amount of sediment flowing into Shihmen Reservoir. Because of the construction of hundreds of sediment-trapping dams or sabo dams, the upper reaches of the Dahan and its tributaries are now among the most heavily impounded river systems in Taiwan, with at least 123 such dams along the main stem alone. The largest 24 sabo dams have collectively prevented some 36 million cubic metres (29,200 acre feet) of sediment from reaching Shihmen Reservoir. Only one, the Junghua Dam, is still collecting sediment, although its 16 million cubic metre (13,000 acre foot) capacity is nearly full. These sediment catching dams have also failed on several occasions causing even more debris and silt to wash into Shihmen. Among these was the failure of Baling Dam during Typhoon Wipha (2007), which caused 10 million cubic metres (8,000 acre feet) of sediment to wash downstream, destroying the village of Baling. Dredging efforts on Shihmen Reservoir have also been only partly successful. Beginning in 1985, seven dredging companies removed more than 10 million cubic metres (8,000 acre feet), but the reservoir continued filling with sediment faster than it could be excavated. The capacity of the silt disposal areas was exhausted in 1995. Other measures taken to decrease sediment flow include the construction of retaining walls and the reforestation of clear-cut areas.

In more recent years, the Taiwanese government has revived the idea of constructing more mega-dams in the Dahan River to increase water retention capacity and trap silt. The Gaotai Reservoir (高台水庫) near the indigenous community of Jianshi would consist of a dam 190 metres (620 ft) high with a 171 million cubic metre (139,000 acre-foot) storage capacity. This project could be built in conjunction with the Bilin Reservoir (比麟水庫) which would divert some water from the Dahan drainage to the Da'an River, increasing the water supply available for Hsinchu County. The dam projects have been strongly criticized as an expensive, yet only marginally effective solution to the problem, and for their effects on local communities.

=== Water quality ===
The large amount of sediment flowing into the reservoir has also caused unusually high nutrient levels, which leads to frequent eutrophication and algae blooms in the summer. As a result, Shihmen is often considered to be among the worst in water quality among all Taiwan's reservoirs. A large water-quality monitoring system is in place, installed circa 2005 at two points in Shihmen Reservoir. Called "Vertical Profiling System" or "YSI 6600EDS", the system measures a series of water quality factors by depth at intervals of 5 metres (16 ft). The turbidity, chlorophyll content, pH level, and dissolved oxygen levels in the reservoir are sent to the operator of the dam every three hours. A future plan for the system is to record algae growth, allowing action to be taken to prevent hypoxic events in the water. In 2008, the Taiwanese Environmental Protection Agency allocated NT$200 million for eutrophication control projects at Shihmen, Feitsui, Zengwun and Kinmen Reservoirs.

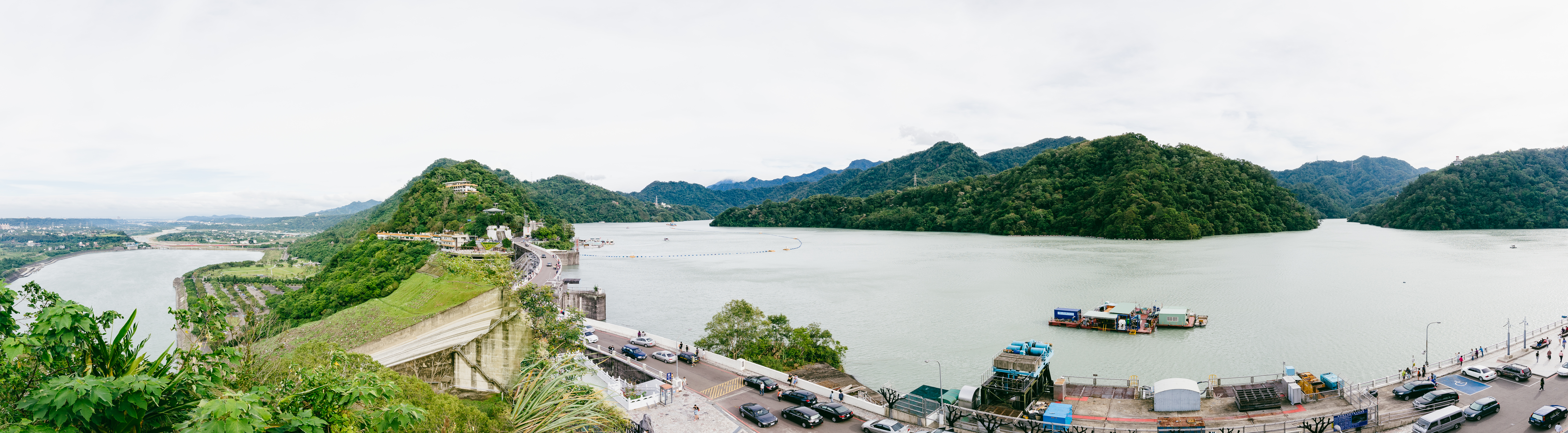
Shihmen Reservoir (right) and afterbay (left), seen from the crest of Shihmen Dam.

== See also ==
- List of power stations in Taiwan
- Feitsui Dam
- List of dams and reservoirs in Taiwan
- Electricity sector in Taiwan
