= Miaoli (disambiguation) =

Miaoli (苗栗市) is a county-controlled city and the county seat of Miaoli County, Taiwan.

Miaoli may also refer to:

- Miaoli County (苗栗縣), a county located in central Taiwan, Republic of China
- Miaoli TRA station, rail station in Miaoli, Miaoli, Taiwan
- Miaoli HSR station, rail station in Houlong, Miaoli, Taiwan
- Miaoli Hills, in Miaoli, Taiwan
- Miaoli, Zhengzhou (庙李镇), town in Jinshui District, Zhengzhou, People's Republic of China

== See also ==
- Miaoli County Council
- Miaoli County Government
- Miao (disambiguation)
- Li (disambiguation)
