= Hsinchu Hills =

Hill in Taiwan

Coordinates: 24°47′N 121°06′E

Hsinchu Hills (Chinese: 新竹丘陵; pinyin: Xīnzhú Qiūlíng) is an area of hills stretching across the Hsinchu County and Hsinchu City of northern Taiwan. The hills lies on the south of Taoyuan Plateau and on the north of Miaoli Hills. It is extended from Hsuehshan Mountain Range as a part of foothills of the range, and adjoins the northwestern seacoast of Taiwan island. The main agricultural products in Hsinchu Hills are Tea plants and some fruits. Hakka people in this region are majority.

== See also ==
- Geography of Taiwan
