= Ronghua Dam =

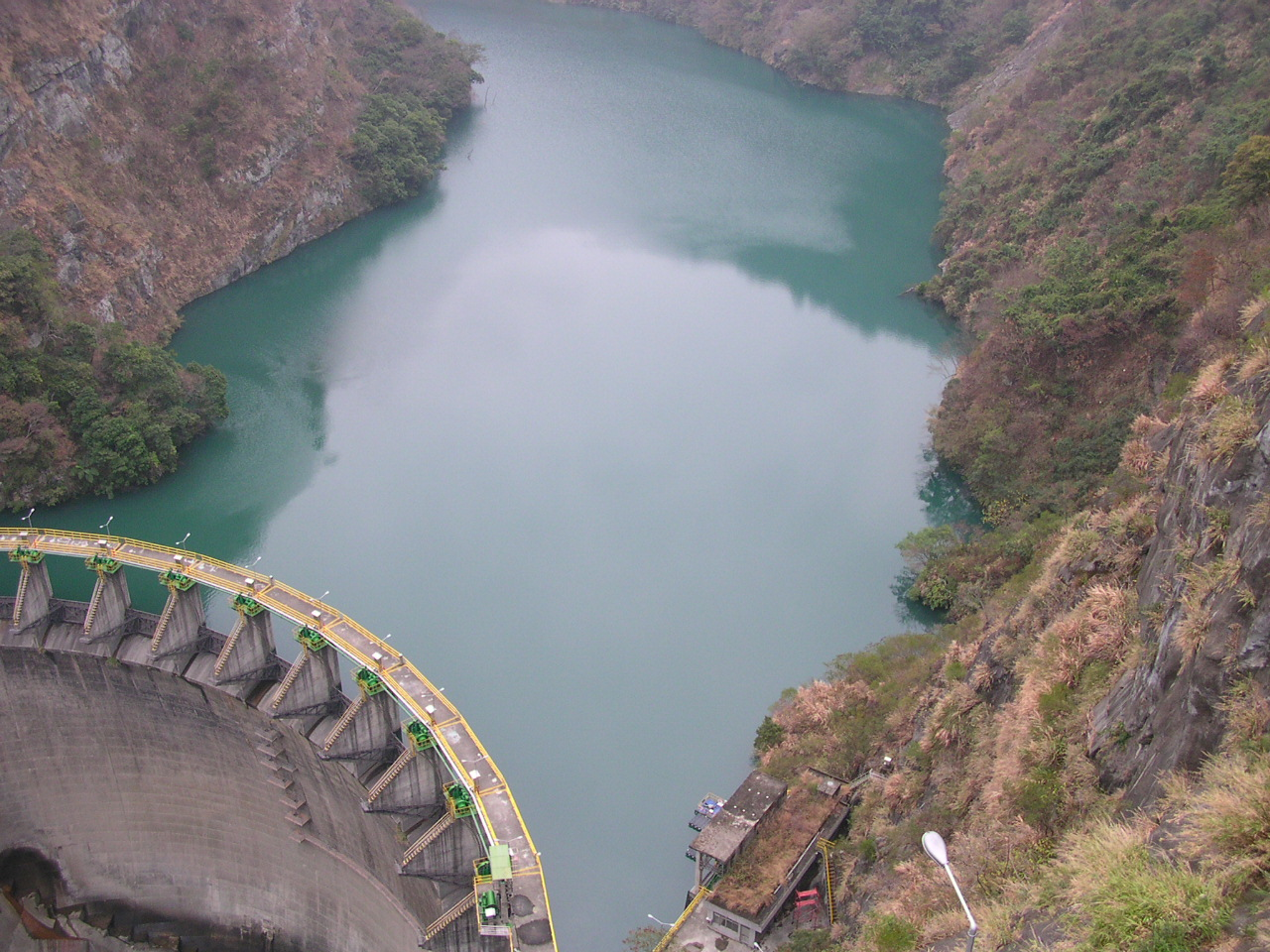
- View of the dam in January 2004
- Location: Taoyuan City, Taiwan
- Coordinates: 24°44′13″N 121°21′03″E
- Construction began: 1978; 47 years ago
- Opening date: 1984; 41 years ago

Dam and spillways
- Impounds: Dahan River
- Height: 82 metres (269 ft)

Reservoir
- Total capacity: 16,700,000 cubic metres (13,500 acre⋅ft)

Power Station
- Installed capacity: 40 MW
- Annual generation: 200 million KWh

Ronghua Dam (Chinese: 榮華大壩; pinyin: Rónghuá Dàbà; Wade–Giles: Jung^{2}-hua^{2} Ta^{4}-pa^{4}) is a concrete arch dam crossing the Dahan River, a tributary to the Tamsui River, in Fuxing District, Taoyuan City, Taiwan.

The dam was started in December 1978 and finished in June 1984. The cost was NT$1.83 billion. The Ronghua Dam is within the catchment area of the Shihmen Reservoir, 27 kilometers upstream of the Shihmen Dam in the Dahan River gorge. The dam's main function is to prevent sand from moving downstream and building up as silt in the Shimen Reservoir. It also serves as a diversion point for sending water to a 40,000 kilowatt hydroelectric plant located 6 kilometres (3.7 mi) downstream.

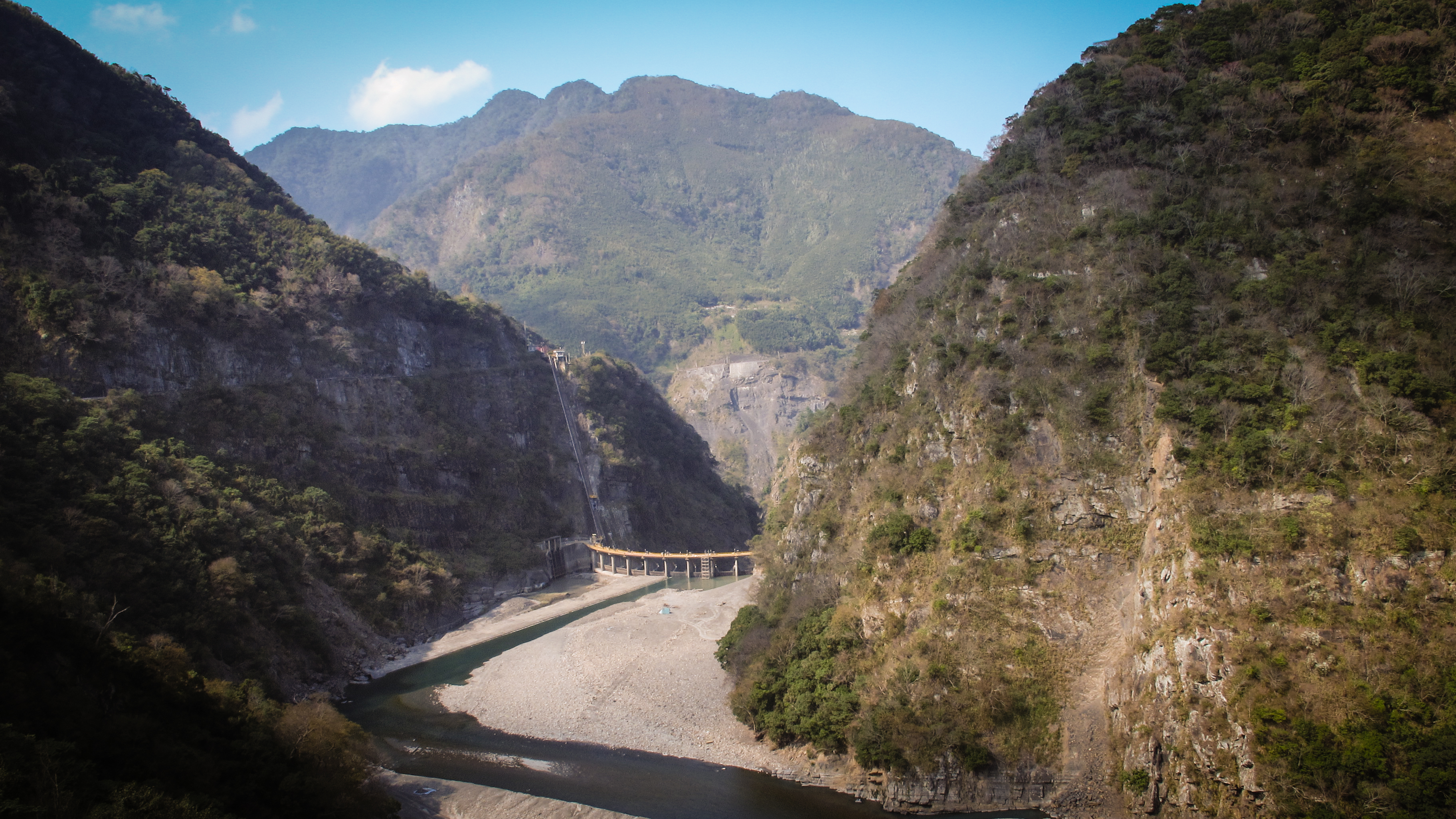
Ronghua Dam in January 2014

As of 2012, the dam has no effective storage capacity, as almost its entire reservoir has been filled by sediment.

== See also ==
- Feitsui Dam
- Shimen Dam
- List of dams and reservoirs in Taiwan
