= Daxi Bridge =

Footbridge in Daxi, Taoyuan City, Taiwan

Daxi Bridge 大溪橋
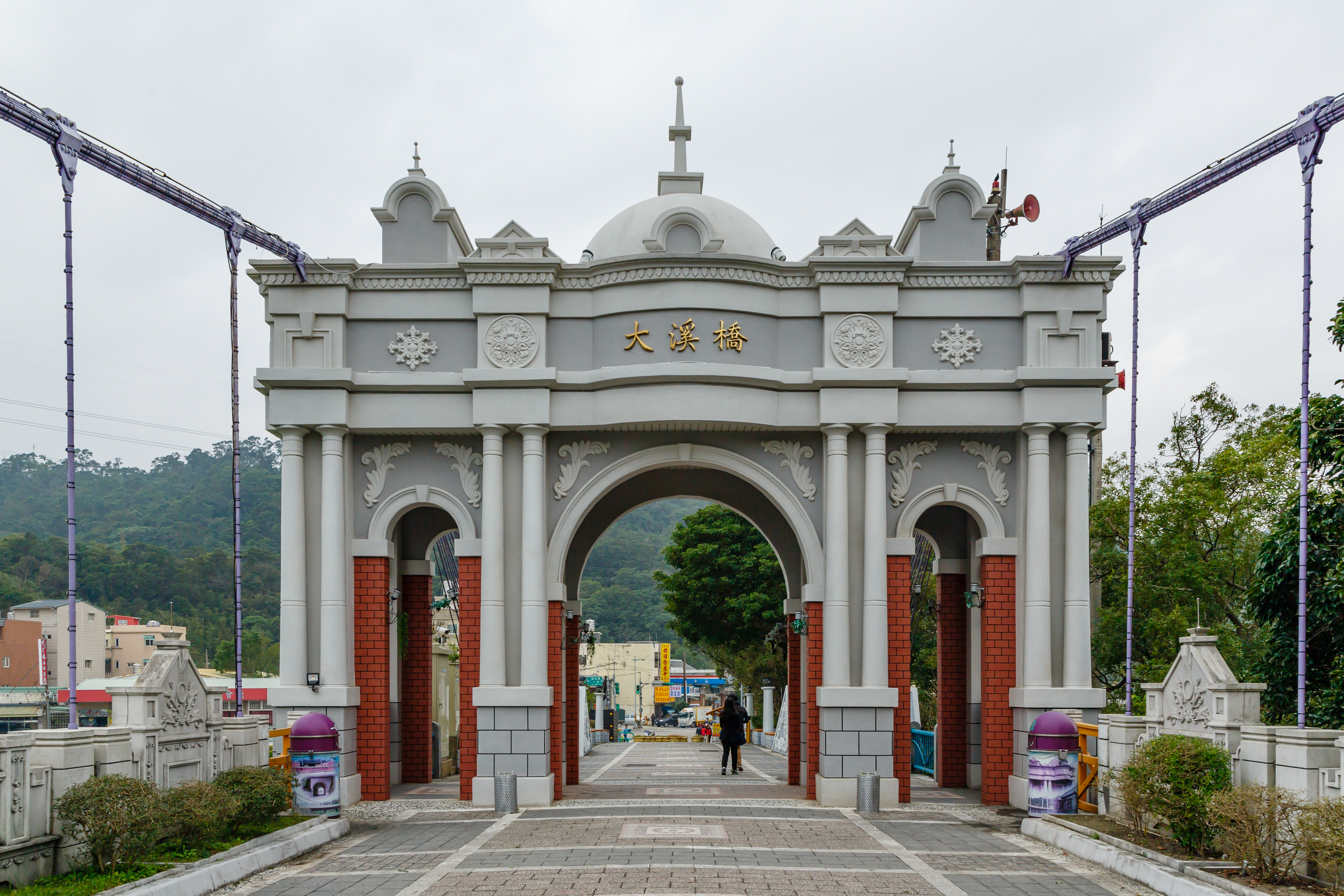
- Coordinates: 24°53′5.6″N 121°17′0.3″E
- Crosses: Dahan River
- Locale: Daxi, Taoyuan City, Taiwan
- Named for: Daxi District

Characteristics
- Design: footbridge
- Total length: 330 meters

History
- Construction end: 1934

Location
- Interactive map of Daxi Bridge

The Daxi Bridge (traditional Chinese: 大溪橋; simplified Chinese: 大溪桥; pinyin: Dàxī Qiáo) is a suspension footbridge in Daxi District, Taoyuan City, Taiwan. It connects Rui'an Road Section 1 and Daxi Old Street. The bridge is also known as the Lover's Bridge.

== History ==
The bridge was originally built in 1934 as a bamboo-wooden bridge constructed from bamboo frames and layered rocks. During the Japanese rule of Taiwan, the bridge was rebuilt into a dual-bored cable suspension bridge with a total length of 280 meters. After the opening of the nearby Wuling Bridge and Second Outer Ring Road, the bridge became gradually less used by the residents. It has seen been reconstructed twice due to the damage caused by typhoons. Lastly, the bridge was renovated again in 2001 after the planning from the Directorate General of Highways and its length became 330 meters.

== Architecture ==
The bridge spans over a length of 330 meters with 13 abutments. It was designed with Baroque-style archway located at its entrance with red tiles. It is also equipped with benches for resting area. The bridge crosses the Dahan River.

== Transportation ==
The bridge is accessible by bus from Taoyuan Station of Taiwan Railway.

== See also ==
- List of bridges in Taiwan
