= Taoyuan Plateau =

Plateau in northern Taiwan

Taoyuan Plateau 桃園台地
- Plateau
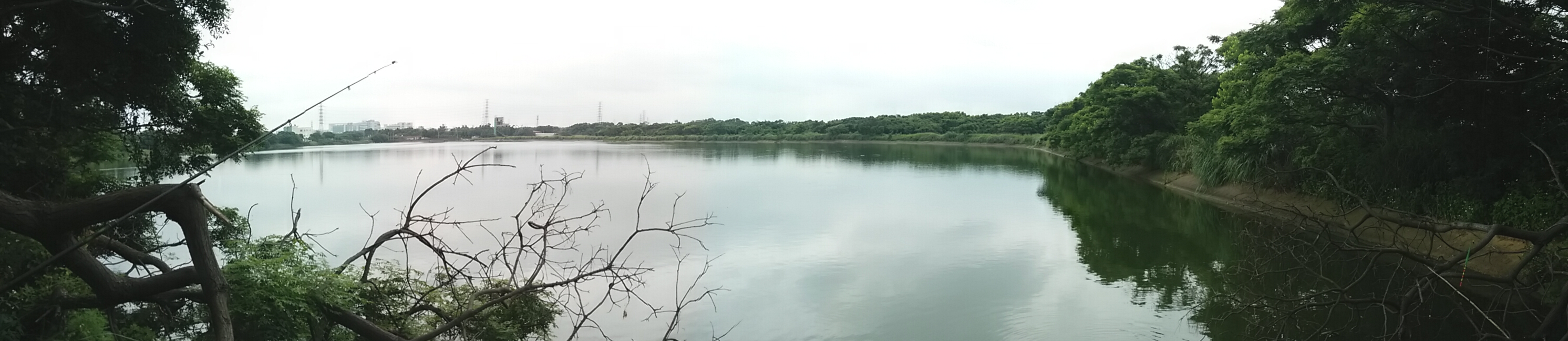
- Location: Taoyuan City, Taiwan
- Geology: Plateau

The Taoyuan Plateau (traditional Chinese: 桃園台地; simplified Chinese: 桃园台地; pinyin: Táoyuán Táidì) is a plateau located in northern Taiwan. It borders the Linkou Plateau in the northeast, the Hsuehshan Range in the southeast, the Hsinchu Hills in the south, and the Taiwan Strait in the west. In order to irrigate this area, many artificial pools have been created across the plateau. It is high, dry, and is full of rice paddies and factories. The basin, in which Taoyuan City is located, is a heavily industrialized region with a population of about 2 million.

== See also ==
- Dahan River
- Geography of Taiwan
