= Taipei Basin =

Geographic region in Taiwan

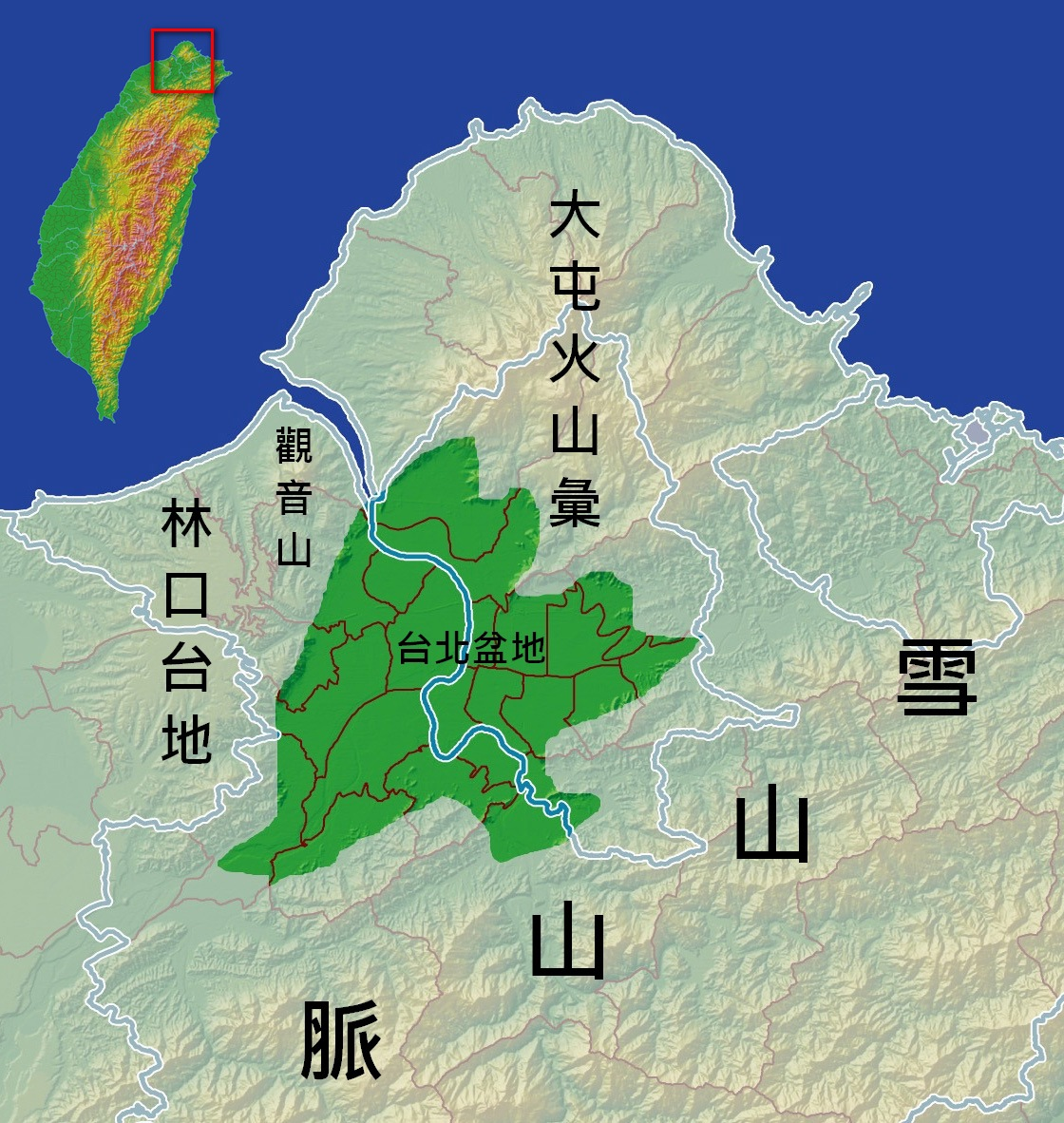
Taipei basin is shown in the map in dark green. The blue lines indicate administrative boundaries.

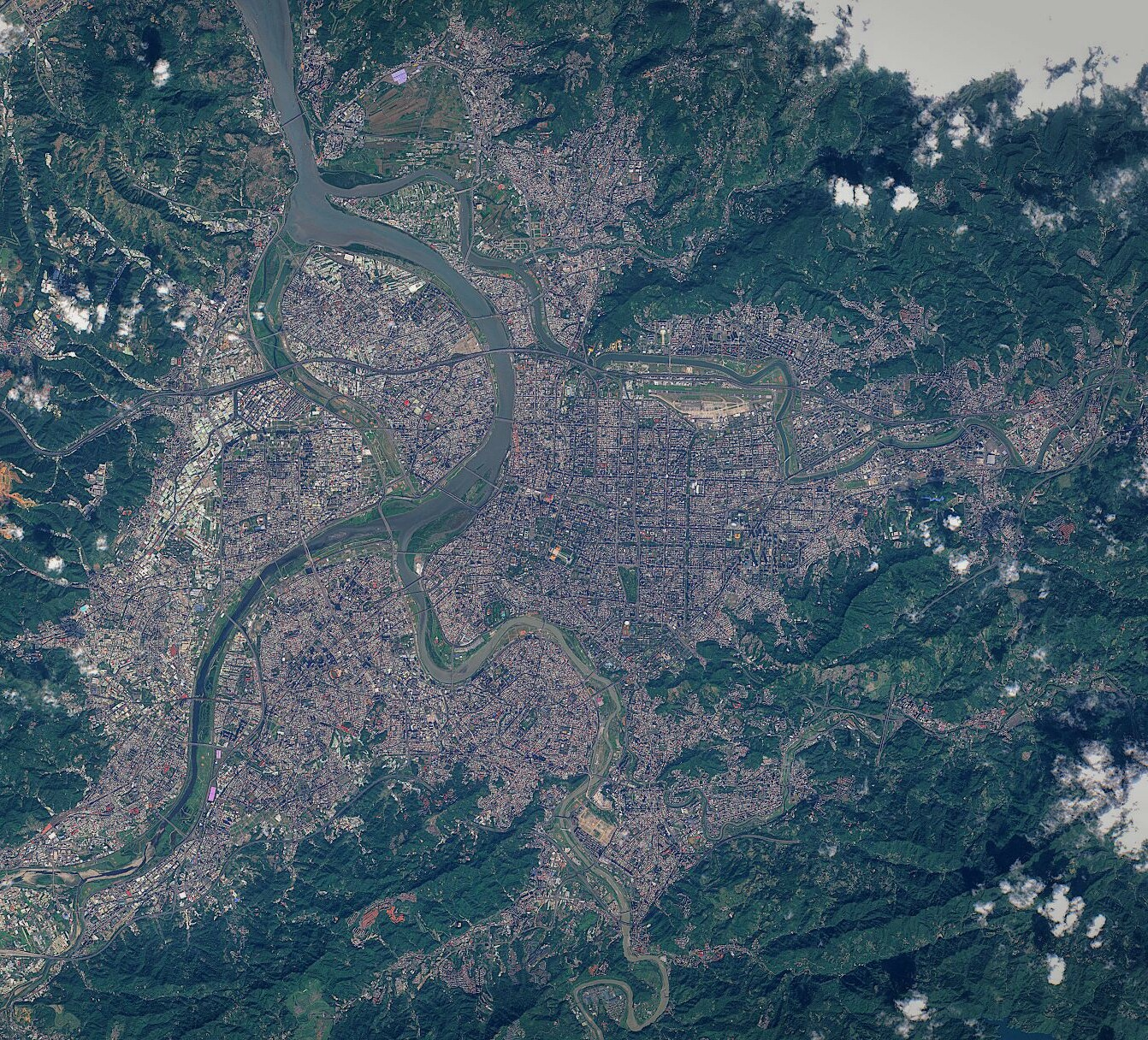
Satellite image of Taipei basin

The Taipei Basin (Chinese: 臺北盆地; pinyin: Táiběi Péndì) is a geographic region in northern Taiwan. It is the largest basin in Taiwan. The basin is bounded by the Yangmingshan to the north, the Linkou Plateau to the west, and the Ridge of Xueshan Range to the southeast. The shape of the basin is close to a triangle. The three vertices are Nangang, Huilong of Xinzhuang, and Guandu of Beitou.

The main rivers in the Taipei Basin include the Tamsui, Keelung, Dahan and Xindian.

In the prehistoric era, the Taipei Basin was home to Ketagalan tribes. Han Chinese did not settle in the region until the 18th century. Today, Taipei Basin is within the boundaries of Taipei City and New Taipei City and is the largest metropolitan area in Taiwan.

== Geology ==
The Taipei Basin is a subsiding half-graben.

== Pollution ==
The Taipei Basin rivers are heavily polluted by both raw sewage and industrial pollution from illegal industry. The natural river restoration is on the agenda of the Taipei City Government and several citizen organizations.

== See also ==
- Geography of Taiwan
