= Dahan River =

River in Northern Taiwan

Coordinates: 25.0426°N 121.4840°E

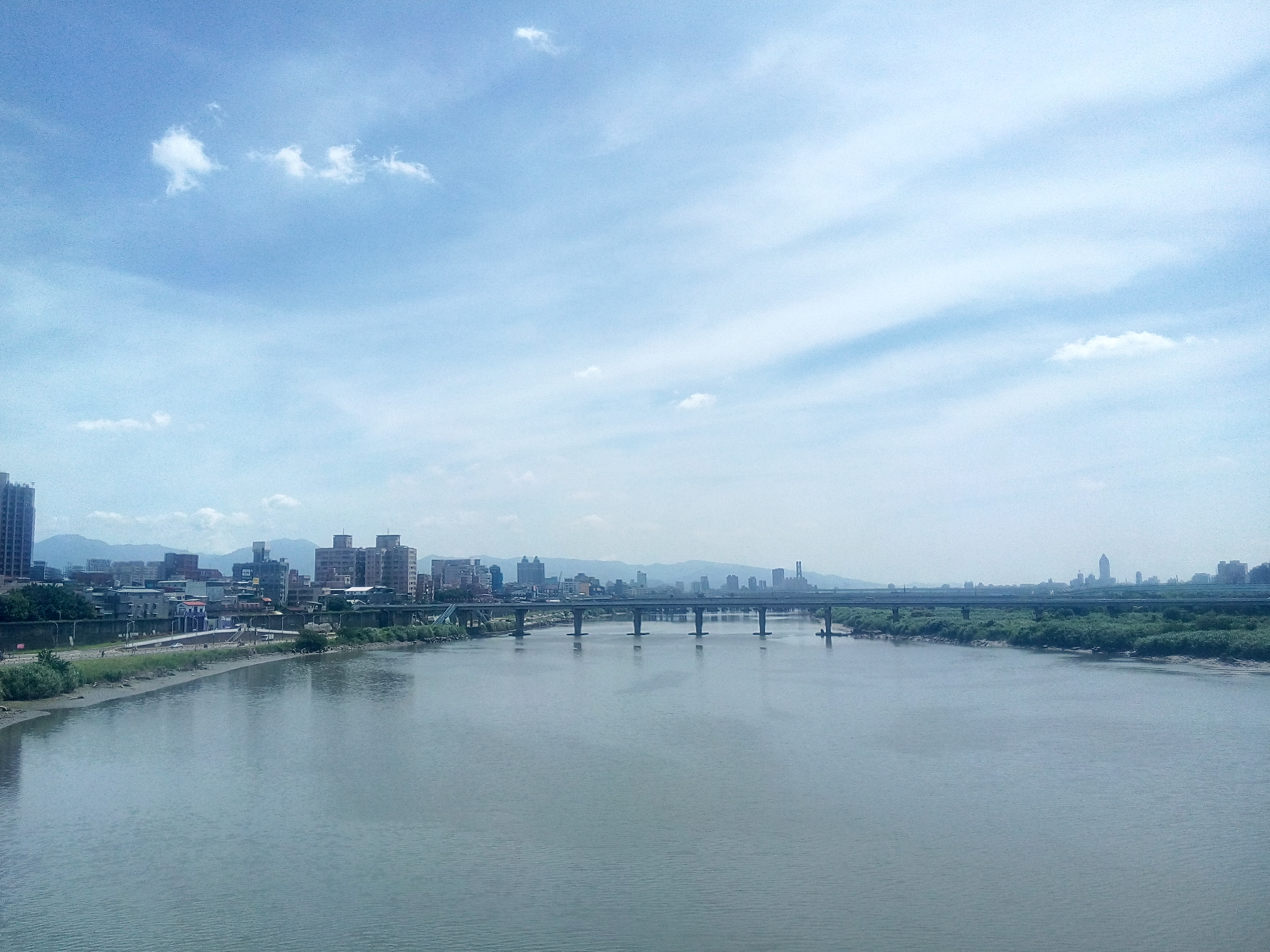
- In New Taipei City

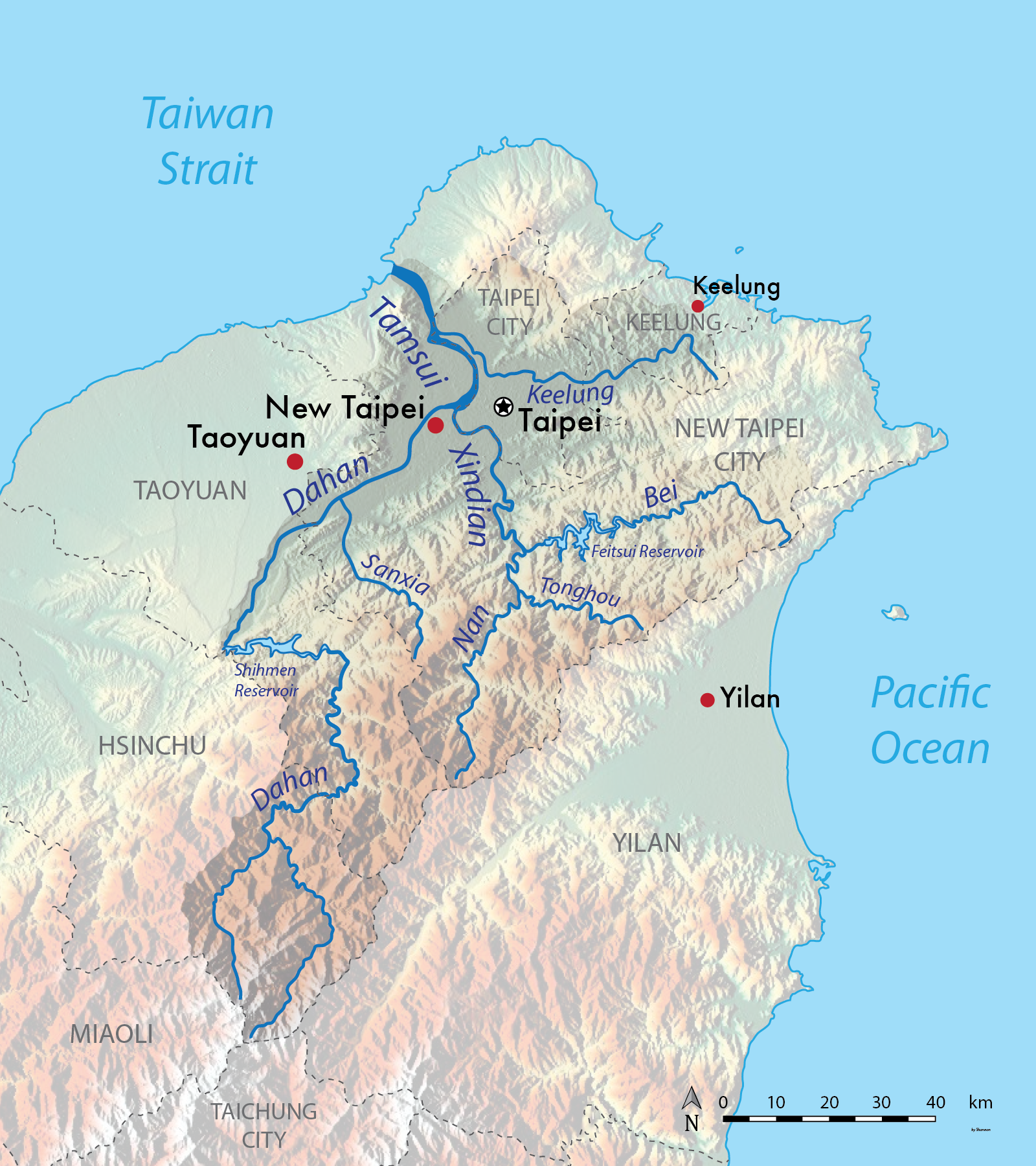
- Map showing the location of the Dahan River within the Tamsui River watershed

Location
- Country: Taiwan

Physical characteristics
- Source: Pintian Mountain
  - location: Hsinchu County
  - elevation: 3,420 m (11,220 ft)
- Mouth
  - location: Tamsui River, Sanchong District, New Taipei City
  - elevation: 10 m (33 ft)
- Length: 135 km (84 mi)
- Basin size: 1,163 km^{2} (449 sq mi)
- Discharge
  - location: mouth
  - average: 59.62 m^{3}/s (2,105 cu ft/s)
  - minimum: 22.94 m^{3}/s (810 cu ft/s)
  - maximum: 13,800 m^{3}/s (490,000 cu ft/s)

Dahan River
- Traditional Chinese: 大漢溪
- Simplified Chinese: 大汉溪
Transcriptions
Standard Mandarin
- Hanyu Pinyin: Dàhàn Xī
Southern Min
- Hokkien POJ: Tāi-hàn-khe

The Dahan River (Chinese: 大漢溪, also spelled Tahan) is a 135 km long river in northern Taiwan. It originates in Hsinchu County and then flows through Taoyuan City and New Taipei City, before it joins Xindian River in Taipei to form the Tamsui River. The upper reaches of the Dahan are also known as Takekan Creek (Chinese: 大嵙崁溪; Pe̍h-ōe-jī: Toā-kho-khàm-khe) or Taigang Creek (Chinese: 泰崗溪). An alternative historical name for the Dahan is the Shihmen River (Chinese: 石門溪).

== Geography and geology ==
The Dahan River begins on Pintian Mountain in Hsinchu County, near the border of Shei-Pa National Park, at the confluence of Takekan Creek (Chinese: 大嵙崁溪) and the Baishi Creek (Chinese: 白石溪) near Jianshi town. The Takekan, the larger of the two is sometimes considered part of the main stem. It flows north through a narrow gorge and receives the major tributaries of Sanguang Creek (Chinese: 三光溪), Lala Creek (Chinese: 拉拉溪), and Xibuqiao Creek (Chinese: 西布喬溪) from the east. At the Dongyanshan (East Eye Mountain) Recreation Area in Fuxing, it turns west and flows into Shihmen Reservoir, which is formed by the Shihmen Dam. Below the dam it flows northeast across Daxi District, then into the Sanxia District of New Taipei City, where it receives the Sanxia River (Chinese: 三峽溪). It continues to flow northeast across New Taipei City until its confluence with the Xindian River, which forms the Tamsui River.

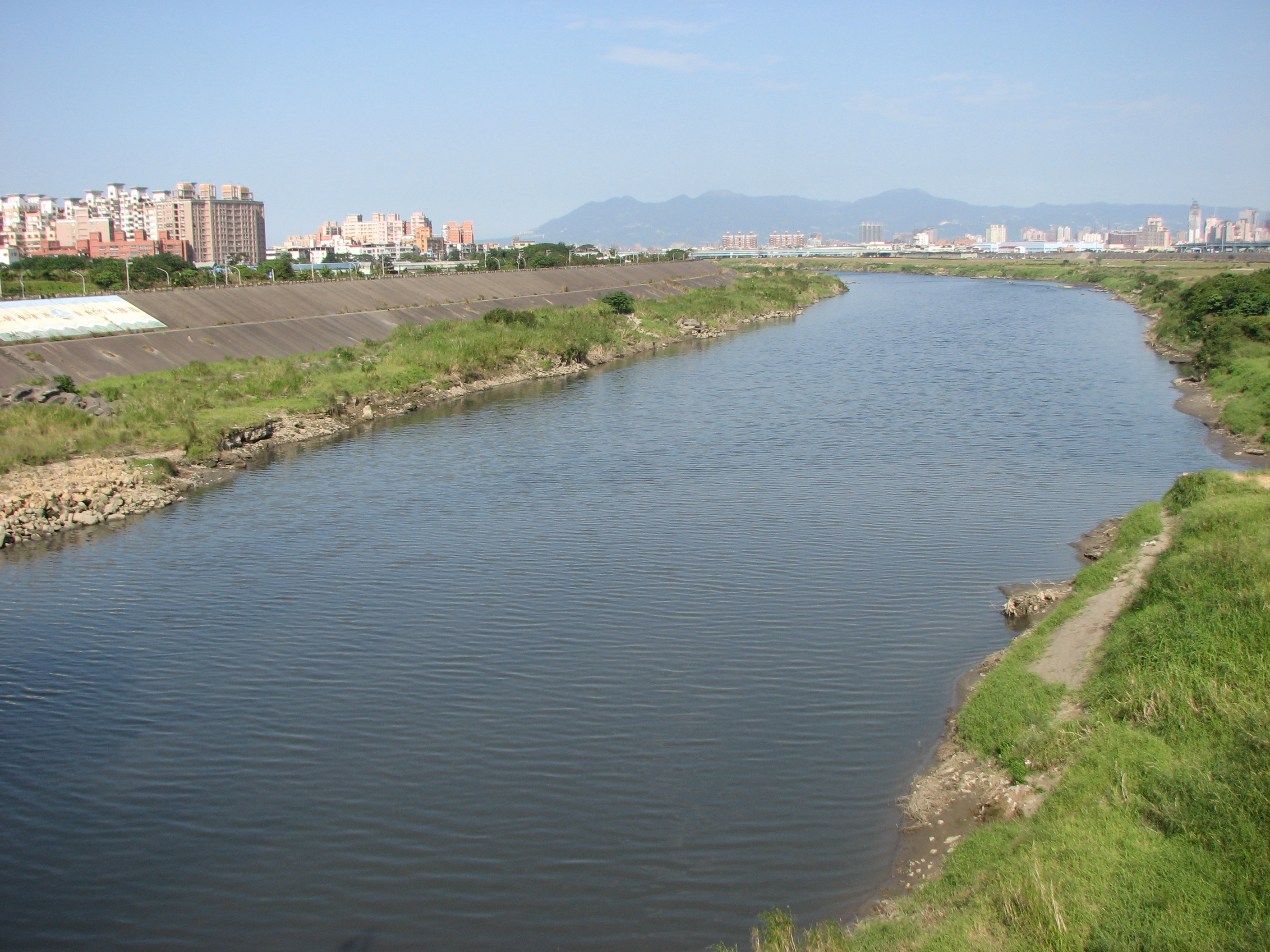
Dahan River in New Taipei

The Dahan River once flowed north through the area of Taoyuan City to empty into the Taiwan Strait about 20 kilometres (12 mi) west of the mouth of the Tamsui River. The Taoyuan Plateau is the ancient alluvial fan of the Dahan River, created by sediments eroded from the mountains. About 30,000 years ago, tectonic movement caused the Taipei Basin to drop in elevation, and the Tamsui River system captured the Dahan River and caused it to flow northeast. As a result the Dahan River cut a canyon through the alluvial sediments for more than 30 kilometres (19 mi) to reach the new lower elevation. The former channels of the Dahan River remain as "beheaded" streams that flow only seasonally across the plateau.

== Dams ==
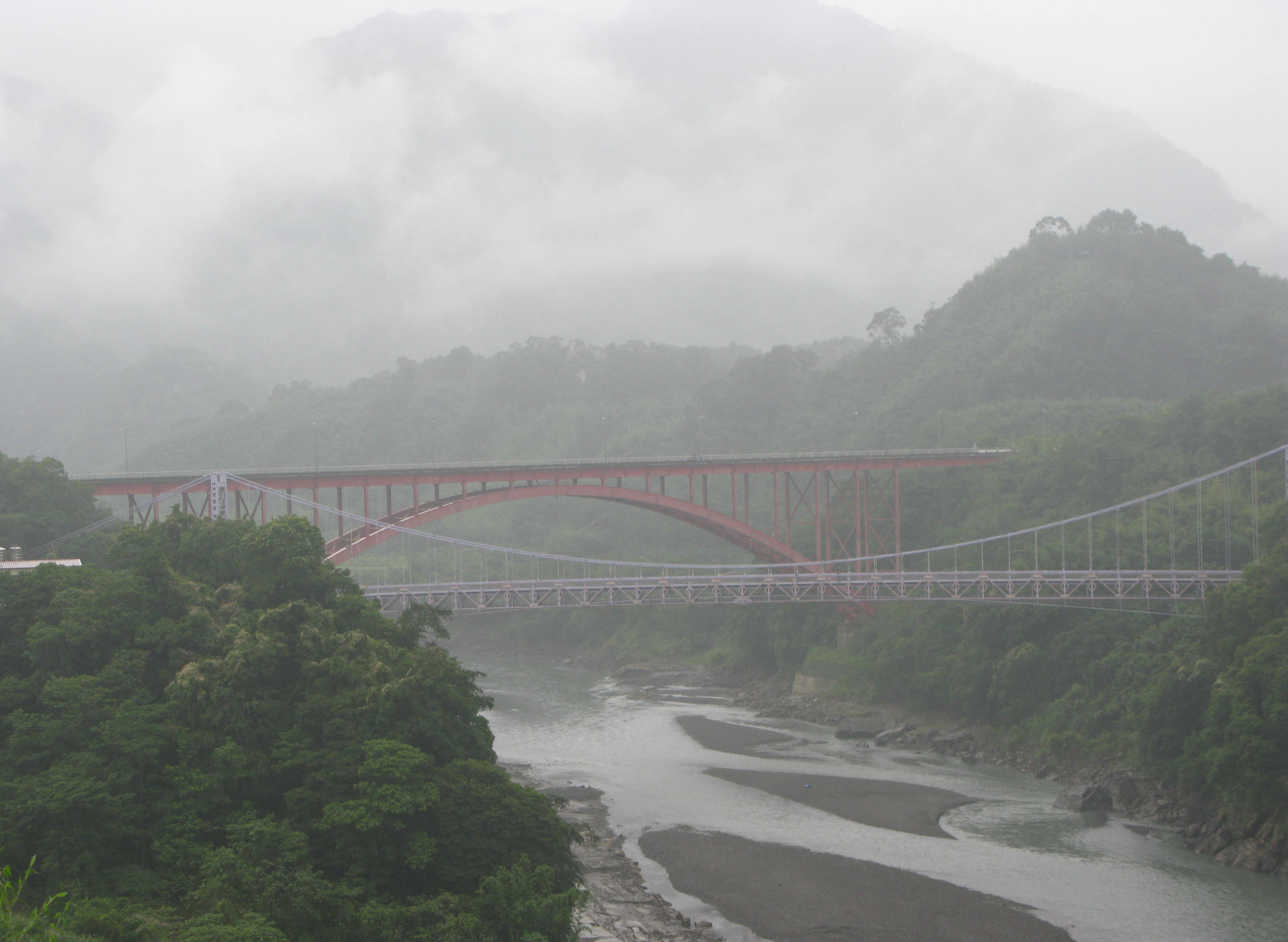
Dahan River and Luo-fu bridge above Shihmen reservoir

Due to the lack of a natural water source for the Taoyuan plateau, thousands of artificial ponds were constructed to capture summer rainfall for irrigation, making the area one of Taiwan's most productive agricultural regions. In 1928 the Taoyuan Canal was dug to divert water from the Dahan River near the present location of Shihmen Dam. The canal enabled a more constant water supply for Taoyuan and effectively returned water to old channels of the river that had been cut off thousands of years ago. Due to urbanization, the Dahan river is increasing in importance as a domestic water source, while the use for irrigation has decreased.

The Shihmen Dam, one of Taiwan's first multi-purpose water projects, was completed in 1964. It provides flood control, irrigation, domestic water supply and hydroelectricity for much of Taoyuan and New Taipei City. The dam has had problems with silt build-up since its construction, due to the high rate of erosion caused by typhoon storms and earthquakes in the upper Dahan River drainage. About 123 "sabo dams" (check dams) have been built along the Dahan River upstream in order to block silt and extend the useful life of the Shihmen reservoir. Chief among these is the Junghua Dam, 26 kilometres (16 mi) upstream. The second largest dam, the Baling dam, failed during Typhoon Wipha in 2007, destroying Baling village and washing 10,000,000 cubic metres (350,000,000 ft^{3}) of silt into the Dahan River.

The Taiwanese government has proposed the construction of a mega-dam on the Takekan Creek known as Gaotai Dam (高台壩) to trap silt and provide additional water storage. This plan has been criticized due to its potential environmental damage, and its limited useful life, because the new reservoir would also eventually fill with silt.

== Bridges ==
- Daxi Bridge
- Luofu Bridge

== See also ==
- List of rivers in Taiwan
