= Linkou Plateau =

Plateau in Taiwan

- Plateau
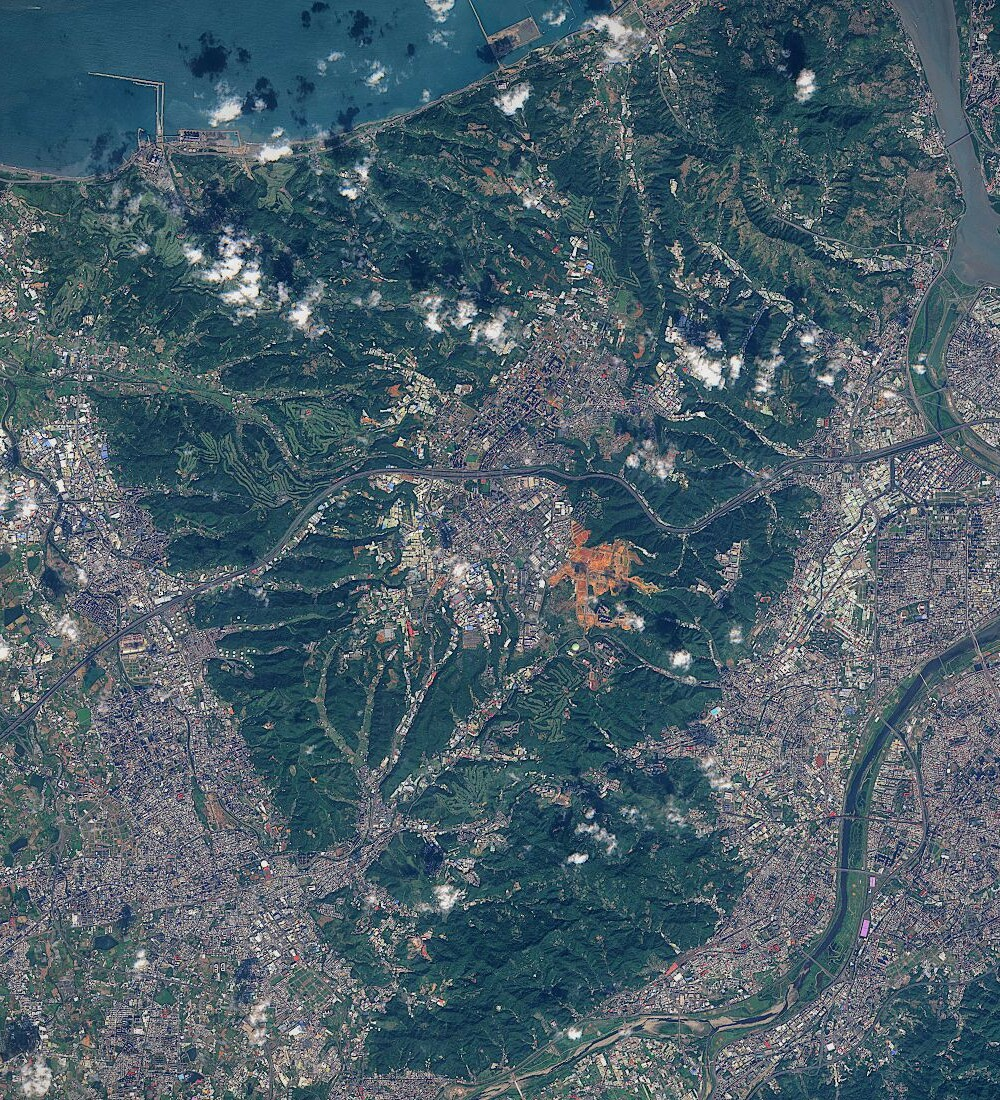
- as seen by Sentinel-2 satellite on 17 November 2016

- Location within Taiwan
- Coordinates: 25.0664°N 121.3644°E
- Location: Linkou District, New Taipei; Guishan District, Taoyuan
- Geology: Plateau

The Linkou Plateau (Chinese: 林口台地; pinyin: Línkǒu Táidì) is a plateau located along the southwest side of the Tamsui River, between Linkou District, New Taipei and Guishan District, Taoyuan, in northern Taiwan. It borders the Taipei Basin in the east, the Taoyuan Plateau in the southwest, the Taiwan Strait in the west, and the Tatun Volcanoes in the northeast. The Xinzhuang Fault (新莊斷層) and Shanjiao Fault (山腳斷層) run between the plateau and the Taipei Basin.
