= Miaoli Hills =

Hill in Miaoli County, Taiwan

Coordinates: 24.4893°N 20.7225°E

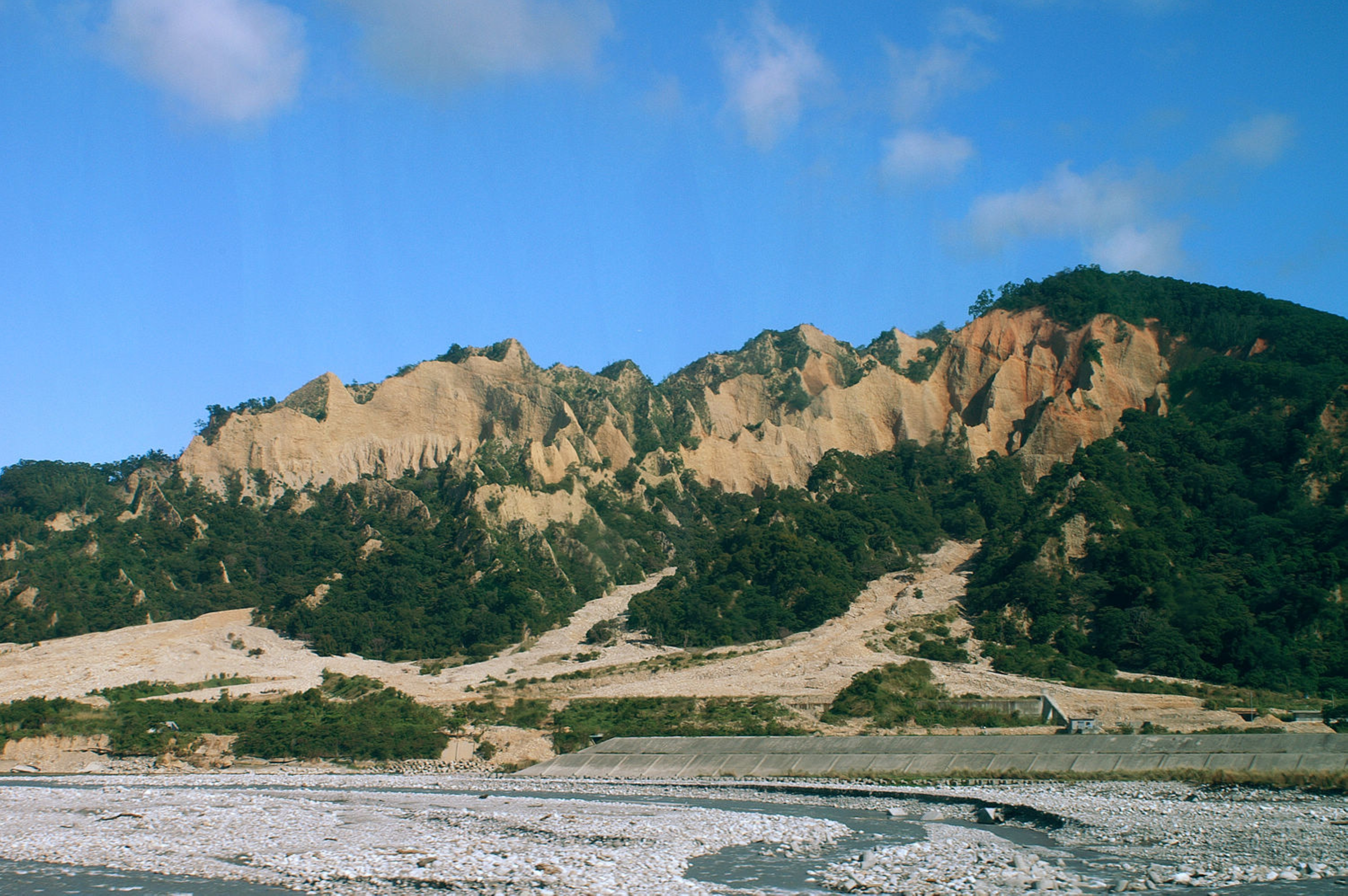
Miaoli Hills

Miaoli Hills (Chinese: 苗栗丘陵; pinyin: Miáolì Qiūlíng) is an area of hills stretching across Miaoli County in north-central Taiwan. The hills lie to the south of Hsinchu Hills and to the north of Taichung. They extend from the Hsuehshan Mountain Range as part of foothills of the range, and adjoin the northwestern seacoast of Taiwan. The Hakka are a majority in this region.

== See also ==
- Geography of Taiwan
