= List of lakes of Taiwan =

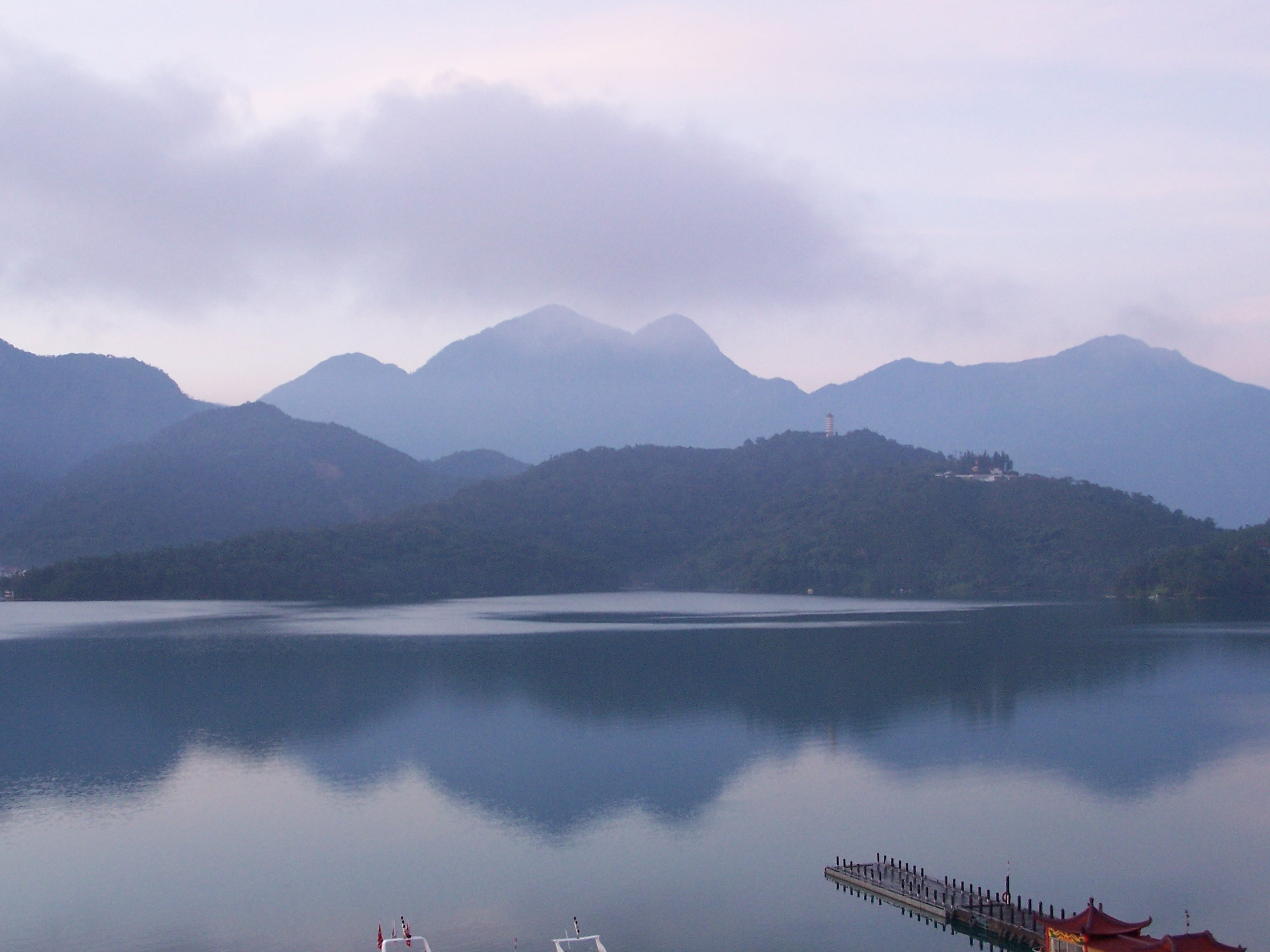
Sun Moon Lake, the largest lake in Taiwan

Taiwan's largest natural lake is Sun Moon Lake. Its largest artificial body of water is the Zengwen Reservoir, formed by the Zengwen Dam. The majority of Taiwan's lakes have multiple functions such as irrigation, electricity generation, water supply and tourist attractions. The volume area of natural lakes tend not to be big.

== Terminologies ==
In Chinese language terminology, smaller bodies of water (ponds) are designated the terms 「池」 ("-chi"), 「塘」("-tang") or 「潭」("-tan"); larger bodies of water are designated as 「湖」("-hu", lake) and 「沼」("-zhao", marsh); while bodies of water with multiple functions such as irrigation, electricity generation, flood control, etc. are called 「水庫」 ("-shuiku", lit. water storage).

== Lists ==
=== Natural lakes ===
Region	Lake	Altitude (Meter)	Source	Type	Area (Hectare)	Capacity (m^{3})	Usage	Notes
Keelung	Lover's Lake	150	Stream	Sightseeing	2		Recreation	
Taipei	Menghuan Lake	870	Rainwater	Wetland, dammed lake	0.3		Conservation	
New Taipei	Songluo Lake	1320	Rainwater	Alpine lakes	5.3		Conservation	
New Taipei	Huangzui Pond	830	Rainwater	Crater lake	0.5		Conservation	
Yilan County	Longtan Lake	20	Rainwater, spring	Tourist attraction	17		Cultivation, recreation, tourist attraction	
Yilan County	Shuanglian Pond	470	Creek	Tourist attraction	9.2		Cultivation, recreation	
Yilan County	Dahu Lake	20	Rainwater, spring	Tourist attraction	6.8		Cultivation, recreation	
Yilan County	Meihua Lake	50	Huotankeng River	Tourist attraction	18.2		Recreation	
Yilan County	Mingchi Pond	1140	Rainwater	Alpine lake	0.3		Recreation	
Yilan County	Cueifong Lake	1850	Rainwater	Alpine lake	8~25			
Taoyuan	Longtan Lake	230	Stream	Tourist attraction	18		Irrigation, recreation	
Taoyuan	Angtian Lake	386	Rainwater	Inland lake	0.4			
Hsinchu County	Yuanyang Lake	1670	Rainwater	Alpine lake	3.6			
Miaoli County	Dexing Pond	400	Spring, rainwater	Tourist attraction	10		Irrigation, recreation	
Miaoli County	Longsheng Lake		Spring	Tourist attraction			Irrigation, recreation	
Miaoli County	Cuichi Pond	3520	Rainwater	Alpine lake	0.004			
Taichung	Taiwantan	160	Spring	Tourist attraction			Recreation	
Nantou County	Malinku	730	Rainwater, spring	Tourist attraction	1.5		Recreation	
Nantou County	Qilintan	620	Rainwater, spring	Tourist attraction	13		Irrigation, recreation	
Nantou County	Liyu Lake	550	Nangang River	Tourist attraction	20		Irrigation, recreation	
Nantou County	Tianluanchi Pond	2900	Rainwater	Alpine lake	0.03			
Kaohsiung	Dagui Lake	2150	Rainwater	Alpine lake	11.87			
Kaohsiung	Nanheng Tianchi Pond	2290	Rainwater	Alpine lake	0.4			
Kaohsiung	Wanshan Shenchi Pond	2150	Rainwater	Alpine lake	1.4			
Pingtung County	Nanren Lake	319	Rainwater	Wetland	124		Conservation	
Hualien County	Qicai Lake	2900	Rainwater	Alpine lake	2.2			
Hualien County	Liyu Lake	140	Spring	Tourist attraction	104		Recreation	
Hualien County	Hualienchi Pond	1100	Rainwater	Alpine lake	1.5			
Hualien County	Baishi Pond	2770	Rainwater	Alpine lake	0.6			
Hualien County	Wanli Pond	2790	Rainwater	Alpine lake	2.8			
Taitung County	Dapo Pond	262		Wetland, tourist attraction	28		Conservation, irrigation, recreation	
Taitung County	Pipa Lake		Beinan River	Tourist attraction			Recreation	
Taitung County	Xiaogui Lake	2040	Rainwater	Alpine lake	5.13			
Taitung County	Chiaming Lake	3310	Rainwater	Alpine lake	0.9			
Taitung County	Lanyu Tianchi Pond	340	Rainwater	Crater lake	0.4		Water supply	

=== Semi-artificial lakes ===
Region	Lake	Altitude (Meter)	Source	Type	Area (Hectare)	Capacity (m^{3})	Usage	Notes
Taipei	Dapi Lake	10	Rainwater	Tourist attraction	8.4		Flood control, recreation	
Taipei	Dahu Lake	10	Rainwater	Tourist attraction	9.2		Flood control, recreation	
Taoyuan	Qianci Lake	250	Caoling River	Tourist attraction	4.8		Recreation	
Taoyuan	Houci Lake	250	Caoling River	Tourist attraction	4.6		Recreation	
Hsinchu	Green Grass Lake	40	Keya River	Reservoir, tourist attraction	16.30		Irrigation, recreation	
Nantou County	Sun Moon Lake	748	Zhuoshui River, Wucheng River (Shuili River tributary)	Reservoir, tourist attraction	840	145,730,000	Power generation, recreation	
Pingtung County	Longluan Lake	18.5	Longluanshan River	Reservoir, wetland	120~175		Conservation, irrigation	

=== Artificial lakes ===
Region	Lake	Altitude (Meter)	Source	Type	Area (Hectare)	Capacity (m^{3})	Usage	Notes
New Taipei	Feicui Reservoir	170	Beishi River	Reservoir	1024	382,870,000 (335,505,000 2023 estimate)	Public water supply, power generation	
New Taipei	Qingtan Weir	22.2	Xindian River	Reservoir	50	700,000	Public water supply	
Keelung	Xishi Reservoir	70	Xishikeng River	Reservoir	9	560,000	Water supply	
Keelung	Xinshan Reservoir	80	Xinshan River	Reservoir	56	10,090,000 (9,959,600 2023 estimate)	Water supply	
New Taipei	Golden Dragon Lake	10	Rainwater	Lake	13.4		Flood control, irrigation	
Yilan County	Jiuqiong Lake	170	Lanyang River	Regulation basin	2.3		Power generation reservoir	
Yilan County	Luodong Weir		Luodong River					
Taoyuan	Shimen Reservoir	245	Dahan River	Reservoir	800	Original water level 309,120,000, 1997 estimate 233,800,000, 2017 estimate 216,000,000, 2023 estimate 205,260,100	Irrigation, power generation, water supply, flood control, landscaping	
Hsinchu County	Baoshan Reservoir	141.6	Chaishu River	Reservoir	60.2	5,470,000	Water supply, irrigation	
Hsinchu County	Baoshan Second Dam	151.73	Zhonggang River	Reservoir	193	31,900,000	Water supply	
Hsinchu County	Dapu Dam	69.6	Emei River	Reservoir	137		Water supply, irrigation	
Miaoli County	Yongheshan Dam	85	Nanzhuang River	Reservoir	165	28,670,000(29,934,300 2023 estimate)	Water supply, irrigation	
Miaoli County	Mingde Dam	61	Laotianliao River	Reservoir	162	12,850,000(12,398,400 2023 estimate)	Water supply, irrigation, recreation	
Miaoli County	Liyutan Dam	300	Liyutan River	Reservoir	432	119,080,000(115,558,700 2023 estimate)	Water supply, irrigation, power generation, recreation	
Taichung	Deji Dam	1408	Dajia River	Reservoir	454	199,830,000(188,663,400 2023 estimate)	Water supply, irrigation, flood control, tourist attraction	
Taichung	Guguan Dam	930	Dajia River	Reservoir	60		Power generation, Regulation basin	
Taichung	Shigang Dam	274.5	Dajia River	Weir	64.5	3,380,000(1,484,100 2023 estimate)	Irrigation, water supply, tourist attraction	
Nantou County	Wushe Dam	1005	Wushe River (Zhuoshui River tributary)	Reservoir	350	53,790,000(36,825,000 2023 estimate)	Regulation basin, recreation, power generation	
Nantou County	Toushe Dam	668	Dasheman River	Reservoir	4.9	230,000	Irrigation	
Chiayi	Lantan Lake	80	Bazhang River	Reservoir	77	9,780,000	Water supply, recreation	
Chiayi County	Renyitan Dam	105	Bazhang River	Reservoir	232	27,100,000(24,802,700 2023 estimate	Water supply, recreation	
Chiayi County / Tainan	Zengwen Dam	227 (230 2023 estimate)	Zengwen River	Reservoir	1,714	708,000,000(1973 full water level) 491,590,000(2013 estimate) 506,852,600(2023 estimate 230 meters above sea level)	Water supply, irrigation, power generation, tourist attraction, flood control	
Tainan	Wushantou Dam	60	Zengwen River	Reservoir	1,300	154,158,000	Water supply, irrigation, recreation	
Tainan	Nanhua Dam	180	Houku River (Zengwen River tributary)	Reservoir	537	115,900,000	Water supply, recreation	
Tainan	Hutoupi	70	Yanshui River, Jialingkan River	Reservoir	25	910,000	Water supply, irrigation, recreation	
Tainan	Baihe Dam	190	Beihe River	Reservoir	197	25,093,448	Water supply, irrigation, recreation	
Tainan	Jianshanpi Dam	45.3	Jishui River	Reservoir	76.17	8,100,000	Water supply, irrigation	
Tainan	Jingmian Dam	143	Zengwen River, Cialiao River	Reservoir	12.50	1,150,000	Water supply, irrigation	
Tainan	Luliao Dam	72	Bazhang River, Touqian River	Reservoir	55.29	3,783,287	Water supply, irrigation	
Kaohsiung	Jinshi Lake	9	Love River	Artificial lake	11		Flood control, recreation	
Kaohsiung	Lotus Pond	11		Artificial lake	42		Flood control, recreation	
Kaohsiung	Meinong Lake	50	Stream	Artificial lake	27		Irrigation, recreation	
Kaohsiung	Chengqing Lake	20	Gaoping River	Artificial lake	103		Water supply, irrigation, recreation	
Kaohsiung	Agongdian Dam	40	Agongdian River	Reservoir	290		Water supply, irrigation, recreation	
Kaohsiung	Fengshan Dam	50	Donggang River	Reservoir	75		Water supply	
Pingtung County	Mudan Dam	132	Rureng River, Mudan River	Reservoir	142	27,930,000	Irrigation, water supply	
Taitung County	Huoshui Lake		Beinan River	Artificial lake	11		Recreation	
Taitung County	Chouqin Dam (Green Island)	27.3	Rainwater	Reservoir	1.23		Water supply	
Penghu County	Chenggong Dam	9	Gangdi River	Reservoir	32		Water supply	
Penghu County	Xingren Dam	11	Rainwater	Reservoir	15		Water supply	
Penghu County	Dongwei Dam	8	Rainwater	Reservoir	8.1		Water supply	
Kinmen County	Cihu Lake							

=== Former lakes ===
Region	Lake	Altitude (Meter)	Source	Type	Description	Notes
Yunlin County, Chiayi County	Caoling Lake	540	Qingshui River	Barrier lake	Created and destroyed four times. Most recent instance from 1999 to 2004.	

Map of Taiwan: Lake

English Name (and Chinese)	Images	Location
Bitan Lake (碧潭湖)		Xindian District, New Taipei City
Changpi Lake (長埤湖)		Sanxing Township, Yilan County
Chengcing Lake (澄清湖)		Niaosong District, Kaohsiung City
Chiaming Lake (嘉明湖)		Haiduan Township, Taitung County
Cueifong Lake (翠峰湖)		Nan-ao Township, Yilan County
Dalun Lake (大崙湖)		Neihu District, Taipei City
Dapo Pond (大坡池)		Chishang Township, Taitung County
Gugang Lake (古崗湖)		Jincheng Township, Kinmen County
Jinshi Lake (金獅湖)		Sanmin District, Kaohsiung City
Lantan Lake (蘭潭水庫)		East District, Chiayi City
Liyu Lake (鯉魚潭)		Shoufeng Township, Hualien County
Longtan Lake (龍潭大池)		Longtan District, Taoyuan City
Meihua Lake (梅花湖)		Dongshan Township, Yilan County
Meinong Lake (美濃湖)		Meinong District, Kaohsiung City
Milk Lake (牛奶湖)		Shilin District, Taipei City
Pipa Lake (琵琶湖)		Taitung City, Taitung County
Sun Moon Lake (日月潭)		Yuchi Township, Nantou County

== See also ==
- Geography of Taiwan
- List of dams and reservoirs in Taiwan
