= Luya River =

River in southeastern Taiwan

Coordinates: 22°53′08″N 121°08′42″E

Luya River (Chinese: 鹿野溪), located in southeastern Taiwan, is a tributary of the Beinan River. Its watershed is distributed in the central and western parts of Taitung County, including most of Yanping Township, the northern end of Beinan Township, the southern end of Luye Township, and the southwestern end of Haiduan Township. The main stream originates from the southeast side of the main peak of Beinan Mountain at an elevation of 3,293 meters. It flows southeastward, then turns eastward near Fengshan, passes through Qingshui, Hongye, and Yanping, and finally joins the Beinan River near Rongshan.
