= Dapi Lake =

Dapi Lake is the former name of two lakes in Taiwan:

- Jinshi Lake, Kaohsiung
- Meihua Lake, Yilan County
