= Dapi =

Dapi or DAPI may refer to:

- Dapi, Yunlin, Taiwan, a rural township
- Dapi Lake, former name of Jinshi Lake, Kaohsiung, Taiwan
- Dapi Lake, former name of Meihua Lake, Yilan County, Taiwan
- DAPI, a fluorescent stain

== See also ==
- Diarylpyrimidines (DAPY), a class of molecules
