= Sizhong River =

River in Taiwan

Coordinates: 22°03′48″N 120°42′27″E

Sizhong River（Traditional Chinese：四重溪), is located in the southern part of Taiwan's Hengchun Peninsula and is classified as a river under central management.

== Geography ==
The main stream's upper reaches are known as Mudan River, which originates in the mountainous area west of Dongyuan Wetland in Dongyuan Village, Mudan Township, Pingtung County. The main stream has a length of 31.91 kilometers and a drainage area of 124.88 square kilometers. It flows through Mudan Township and Checheng Township in Pingtung County, with major tributaries including Liren River, Zhushi River, and Damei River, before finally emptying into the Taiwan Strait near Checheng Bridge.
