= Luliao River =

River in southeastern Taiwan

Luliao River (Traditional Chinese：鹿寮溪), located in southeastern Taiwan, is a tributary of the Beinan River. Its watershed is distributed in the north-central part of Taitung County, including the northwestern part of Luye Township, the northeastern part of Yanping Township, and the southern end of Haiduan Township. The main stream originates from the southern side of Jianshi Mountain at an elevation of 2,862 meters (9,390 ft). It flows southeastward through Wuling and Yongde, and joins the Beinan River near Yonglong.
