= Beinan =

Beinan (Chinese: 卑南) may refer to these topics in Taiwan:

- Beinan, Taitung, a township in Taitung County
- Puyuma people, an aboriginal people in Taitung County, also known as Beinan people
- Beinan River, a small river in Taitung County

== See also ==
- Beinan Cultural Park, an archaeological site in Beinan Township
