= Milk Lake (Taiwan) =

Lake in Shilin, Taipei, Taiwan

- 牛奶湖 (Chinese)
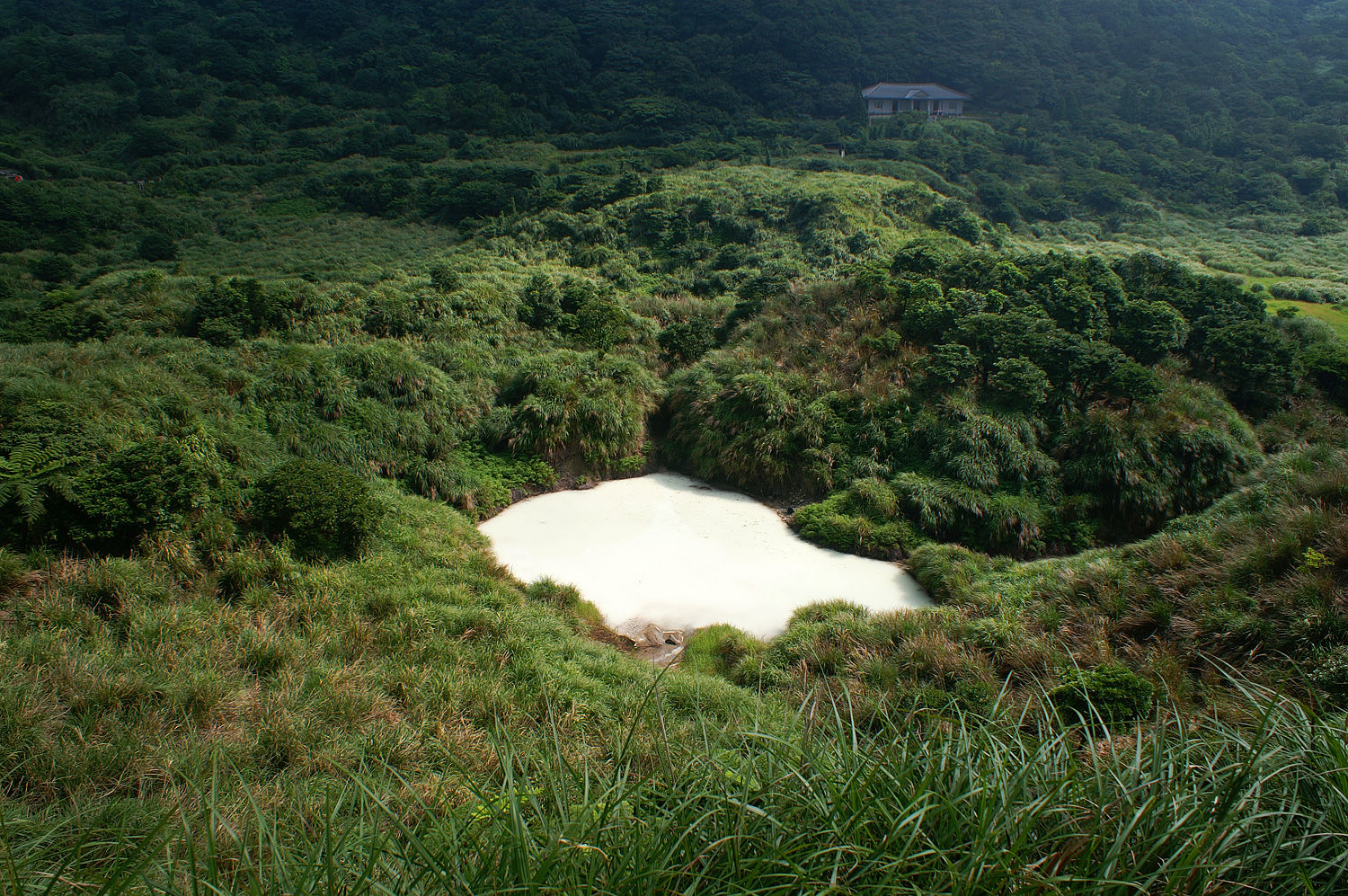

- Taiwan
- Location: Shilin, Taipei, Taiwan
- Coordinates: 25°10′00.6″N 121°33′52.1″E
- Type: Lake

The Milk Lake (Chinese: 牛奶湖; pinyin: Niúnǎi Hú) (also known as Milk pond) is a lake in Shilin District, Taipei, Taiwan. The lake is part of Yangmingshan National Park. The temperature of Milk lake is around 40 °C (104 °F). This lake was formed due to volcanic activities and the surrounding landscape.

== Geology ==
The lake turns white due to the sulfurous fumes vented from the lake bed which turns the water a milky white color. After gradually precipitating, the sulfur forms whitish-yellow or pale grey layers on the lake bed.

== Transportation ==
The lake is accessible by bus from Shilin Station of Taipei Metro.

== See also ==
- Geography of Taiwan
- List of lakes of Taiwan
