= Pipa Lake =

Lake in Taitung City, Taitung County, Taiwan

- 琵琶湖 (Chinese)
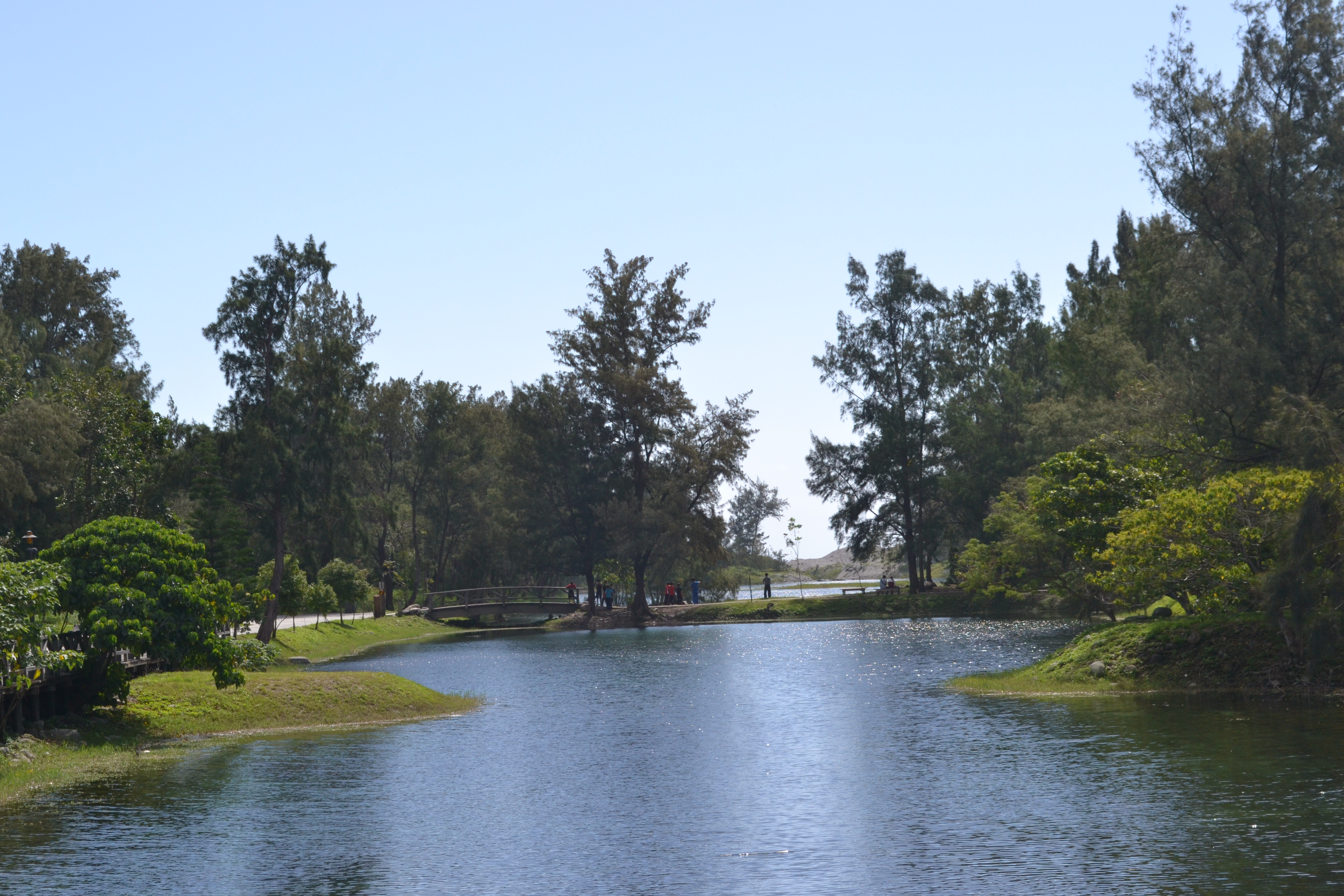

- Location within Taitung County
- Location: Taitung City, Taitung County, Taiwan
- Coordinates: 22°45′25.5″N 121°09′57.6″E
- Type: lake

The Pipa Lake (Chinese: 琵琶湖; pinyin: Pípá Hú) is a lake in Taitung City, Taitung County, Taiwan.

== Name ==
The lake is named Pipa because it resembles the shape of the pipa, the traditional Chinese musical instrument, appearing like two connected water bodies, one seeming bigger than the other.

== Geology ==
The lake is the habitat for aquatic animals and plants, and forms part of the Taitung Forest Park. The lake is equipped with viewing platform, cabin and bike routes.

== See also ==
- Geography of Taiwan
- List of lakes of Taiwan
