= Chiaming Lake =

Lake in Haiduan, Taitung County, Taiwan

- 嘉明湖 (Chinese)
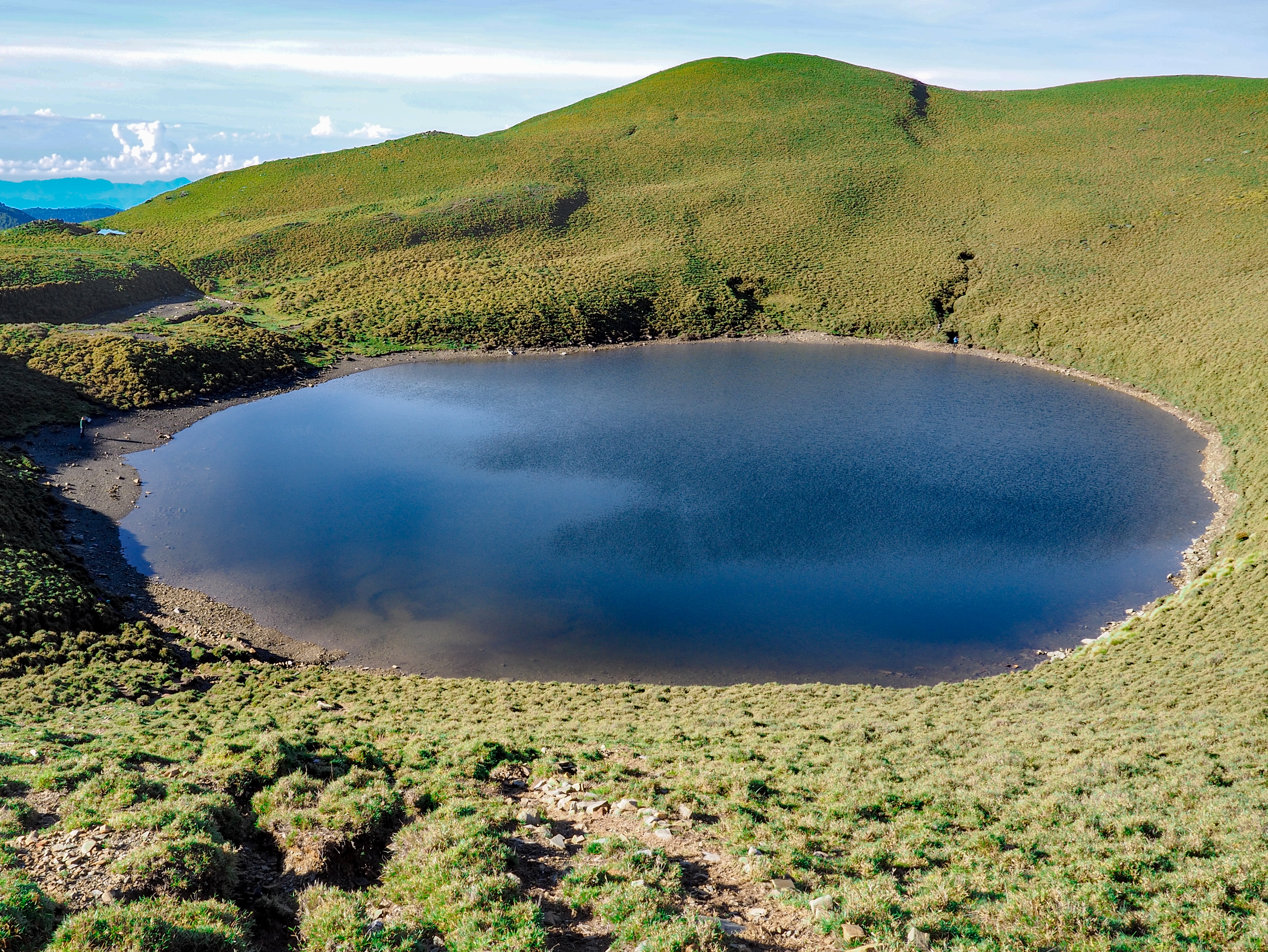

- Location within Taitung County
- Location: Haiduan, Taitung County, Taiwan
- Coordinates: 23°17′34.3″N 121°02′03.1″E
- Type: lake
- Max. length: 120 meters (390 ft)
- Max. width: 80 meters (260 ft)
- Surface elevation: 3,310 meters (10,860 ft)

The Chiaming Lake (Chinese: 嘉明湖; pinyin: Jiāmíng Hú; Bunun：Cidanuman Buan (mirror of the moon)) is a tarn in Haiduan Township, Taitung County, Taiwan. It is the second highest lake in Taiwan.

== Name ==
In Bunun language, Chiaming Lake is called "cidanuman buan", meaning "Mirror of the moon"; in Taiwan, it is traditionally referred as "Angel's teardrop" or, due to its deep blue color, "God's lost sapphire".

== History ==
The lake was formed by glacial movement during the ice age.

The forest authority closed the mountain area for maintenance and restoration works on 10 December 2014 until 31 March 2015. On 5 January 2018, the lake was closed for visitors and will be opened again on 1 April 2018 to allow the natural vegetation restoration of the area around the lake.

== Geography ==
This oval-shaped lake is located along the Southern Cross-Island Highway. The lake surface is 120 meters long and 80 meters wide at an elevation of 3,310 meters. It is surrounded by emerald green forest plantation and wildlife. The area surrounds the lake has lodges and hiking trail with a length of 13 km.

== See also ==
- Geography of Taiwan
- List of lakes of Taiwan
- List of tourist attractions in Taiwan
