= Lisong Hot Spring =

Hot spring in Haiduan, Taitung County, Taiwan

- 栗松溫泉
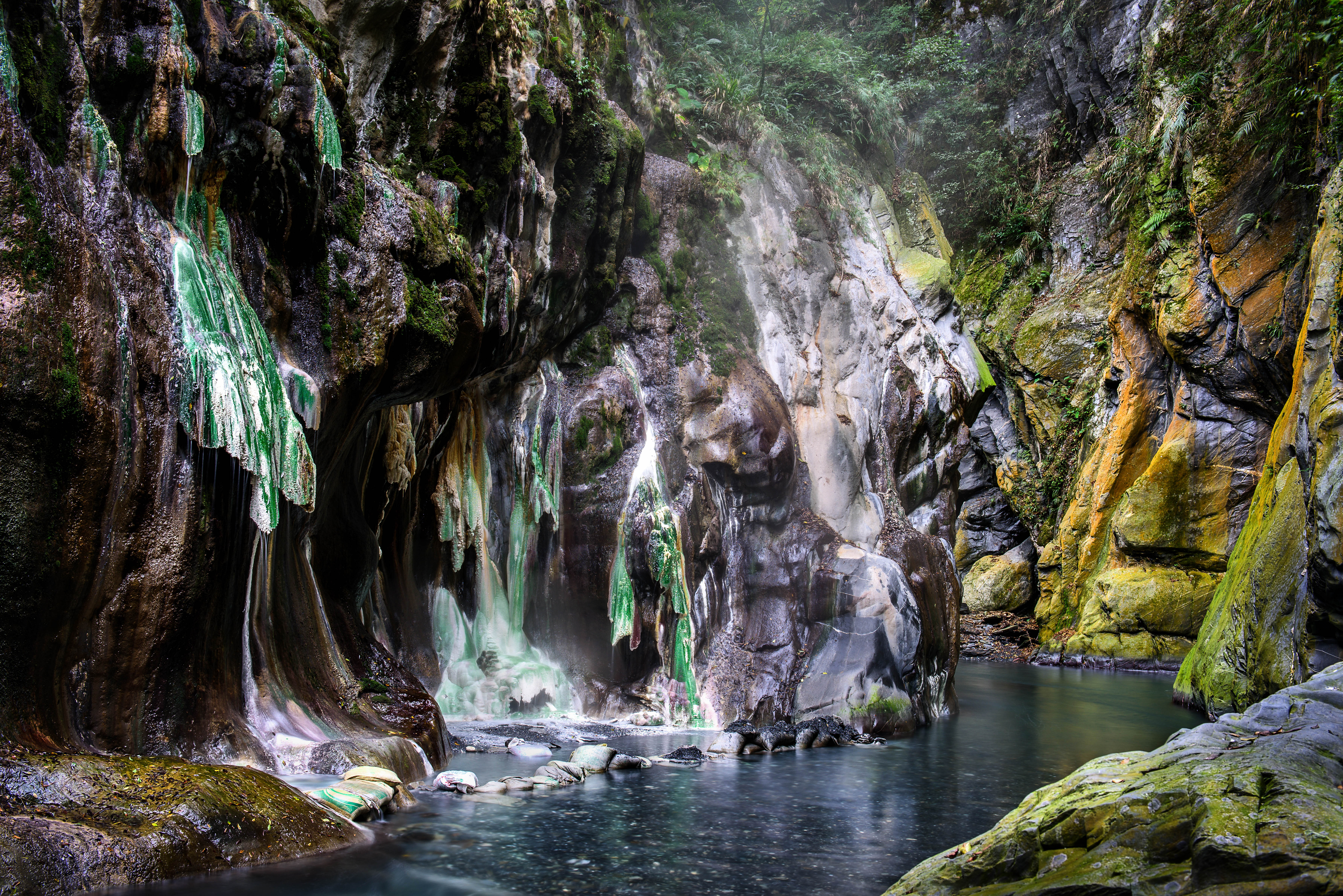

- Location within Taitung County
- Interactive map of Lisong Hot Spring
- Location: Haiduan, Taitung County, Taiwan
- Coordinates: 23°11′52.6″N 121°02′13.9″E
- Elevation: 1,075 m (3,527 ft)
- Type: hot spring

The Lisong Hot Spring (traditional Chinese: 栗松溫泉; simplified Chinese: 栗松温泉; pinyin: Lìsōng Wēnquán) is a hot spring in Haiduan Township, Taitung County, Taiwan.

== Geology ==
The hot spring is located 1,075 meters above sea level. The hot spring came out from the holes of stone slopes forming waterfalls located in a deep river valley.

== Transportation ==
The hot spring is accessible on foot from the Southern Cross-Island Highway. Visitors need to walk through trail down to the valley to reach the place.

== See also ==
- Taiwanese hot springs
