= Baoshan, Hsinchu =

Rural township in Hsinchu County, Taiwan

Coordinates: 24°44′34.05″N 120°59′56.77″E

Baoshan Township 寶山鄉
- Rural township
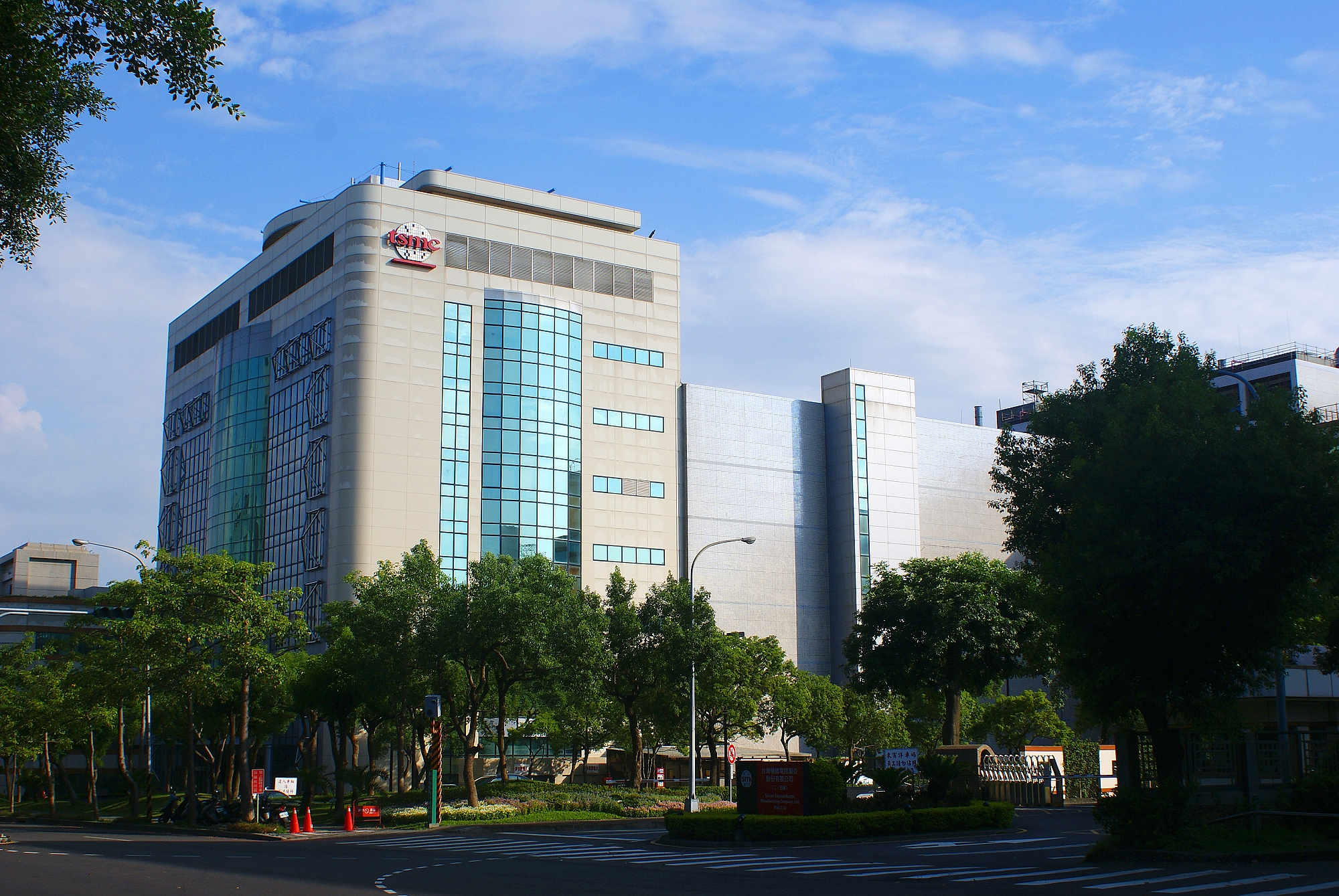

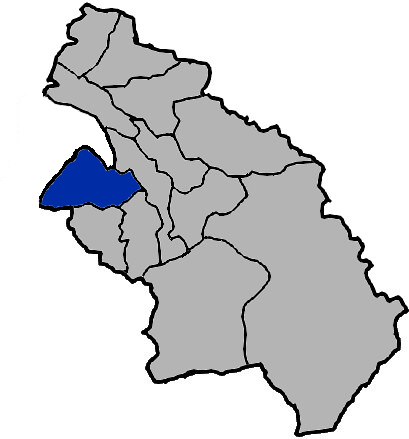
- Baoshan Township in Hsinchu County
- Location: Hsinchu County, Taiwan

Area
  - Total: 65 km^{2} (25 sq mi)

Population (March 2023)
  - Total: 14,402
  - Density: 220/km^{2} (570/sq mi)

Baoshan Township (Chinese: 寶山鄉; pinyin: Bǎoshān Xiāng) is a rural township in Hsinchu County, Taiwan. It is ostensibly a suburb of Hsinchu City to the north and west, and is also bounded by Zhudong City to the east, Beipu and Emei Towns to the south, and Miaoli County to the west.

== Name ==
The name Baoshan means "Treasure Mountain" in Mandarin Chinese.

== History ==
Baoshan was formerly known as "Caoshan", which was named after the ancestors of the Han nationality in the Qing Dynasty because of the overgrown hills and weeds in the area. In 1946 Baoshan and Zhudong townships were merged into Hsinchu City, but in 1950 when Hsinchu was reduced to a county-administered city, Baoshan and Zhudong returned to a township.

== Geography ==
The town is populated predominantly by people of Hakka ethnicity, and is part of "the Greater Daai Area -- the largest Hakka area in northern Taiwan" along with Beipu and Emei. However, recent suburbanization has probably led to a large increase in the proportion of non-Hakka people due to its proximity to Hsinchu City, which is mostly Minnan Taiwanese.

Baoshan is a hilly, semi-mountainous area with an urban and suburban part in the northern part nearest Hsinchu City. A significant and growing part of the Hsinchu Science Park is located in Baoshan. The rest of the town is predominantly agricultural, particularly plentiful in hillside orchards of tangerines and lychee nuts.

- Area: 64.84 km^{2} (25.03 sq mi)
- Population: 14,402 (March 2023)

== Administrative divisions ==
The township comprises 10 villages: Baodou, Baoshan, Daqi, Sanfeng, Shanhu, Shenjing, Shuangxi, Shuangxin, Xincheng and Youtian.

== Reservoirs ==
Baoshan Town is also the location of Baoshan Reservoirs (Chinese: 寶山水庫; pinyin: Bǎoshān Shuǐkù) I and II, which supply drinking water to the city of Hsinchu and cooling water to the Science Park's foundries.

== Transportation ==
A large interchange called Hsinchu System is located here, which is a major junction which connects Freeways No.1 and No.3. Taiwan High Speed Rail passes through the central part of the township, but no station is currently planned.
