= Liyutan Dam =

Dam in Sanyi, Miaoli County, Taiwan

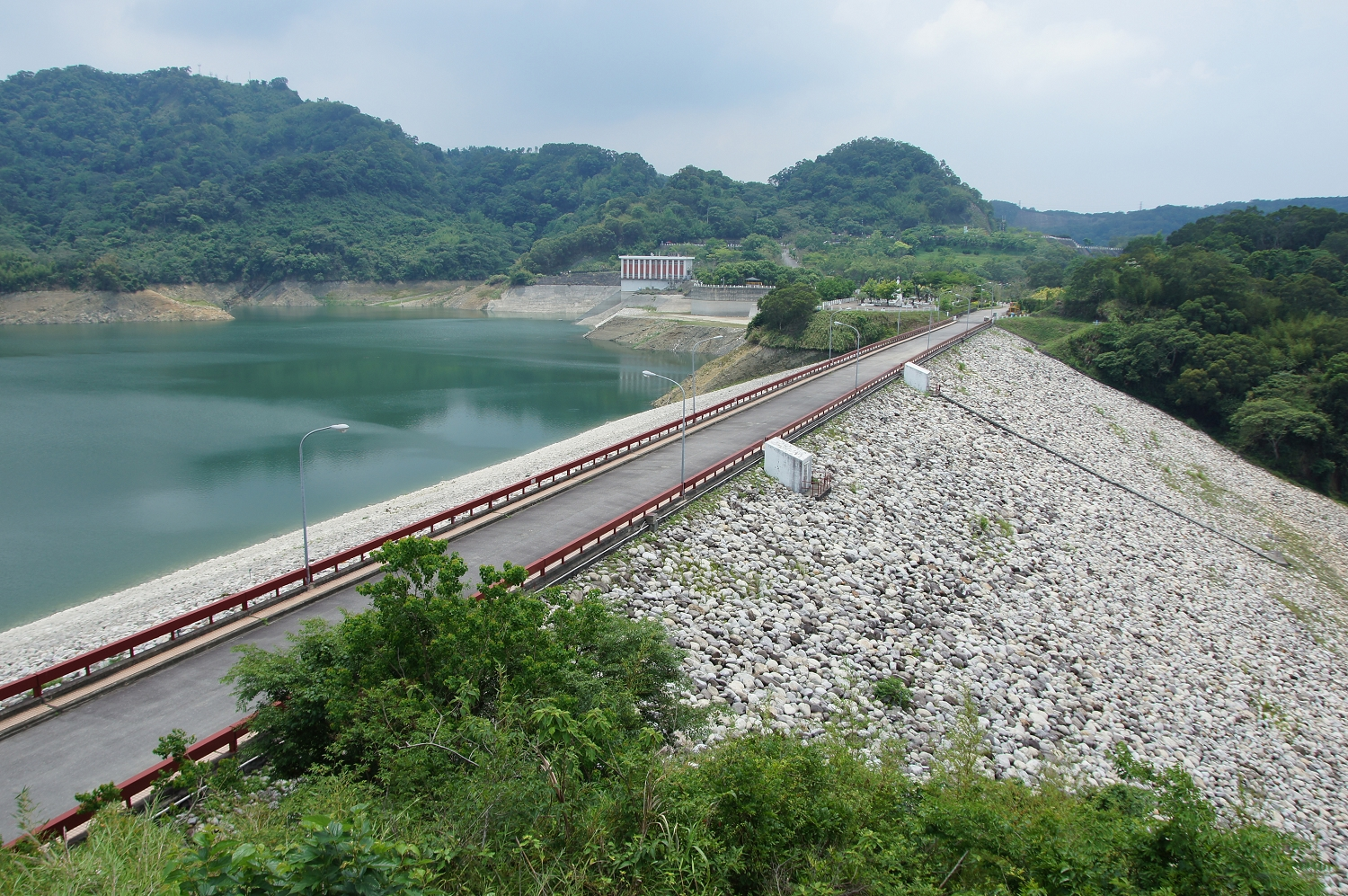

- Location within Miaoli County
- Official name: 鯉魚潭壩
- Location: Sanyi, Miaoli County, Taiwan
- Coordinates: 24°20′28.59″N 120°46′53.9″E
- Purpose: water supply, irrigation
- Status: Operational
- Construction began: July 1985; 41 years ago
- Opening date: November 1992; 33 years ago

Dam and spillways
- Type of dam: Embankment dam
- Impounds: Da'an River
- Height: 95 m (312 ft)
- Length: 306 m (1,004 ft)

Reservoir
- Total capacity: 126,120,000 m^{3}
- Active capacity: 122,710,000 m^{3}
- Surface area: 4.32 km^{2}
- Maximum water depth: 300 m

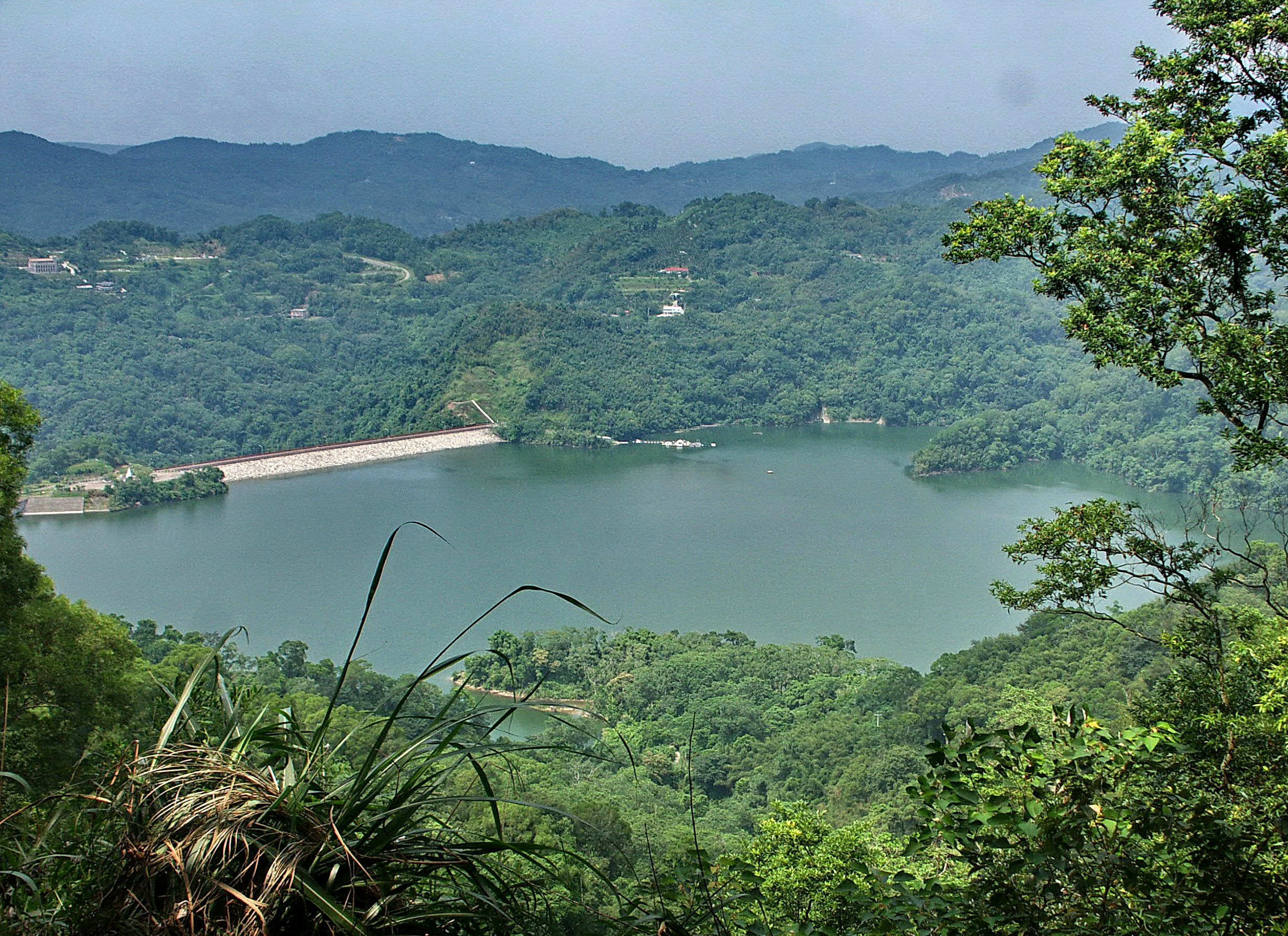
Liyutan Reservoir

The Liyutan Dam (traditional Chinese: 鯉魚潭壩; simplified Chinese: 鲤鱼潭坝; pinyin: Lǐyútán Bà) is a dam in Sanyi Township, Miaoli County, Taiwan.

== History ==
The dam was initially constructed in July 1985 and was opened in November 1992.

== Technical specifications ==
The dam has a total capacity of 126,120,000 m^{3} and an effective capacity of 122,710,000 m^{3}. Its water surface spans over an area of 4.32 km^{2} with a maximum depth of 300 m. The dam forms the Liyutan Reservoir and discharges its water to Da'an River. The dam supplies water to the public in Taichung City and Miaoli County, as well as 4,209 hectares of irrigation area.

== Transportation ==
The dam is accessible east from Tai'an Station of Taiwan Railway.

== See also ==
- List of dams and reservoirs in Taiwan
