= Dalun Lake =

Lake in Neihu, Taipei, Taiwan

- 大崙湖 (Chinese)
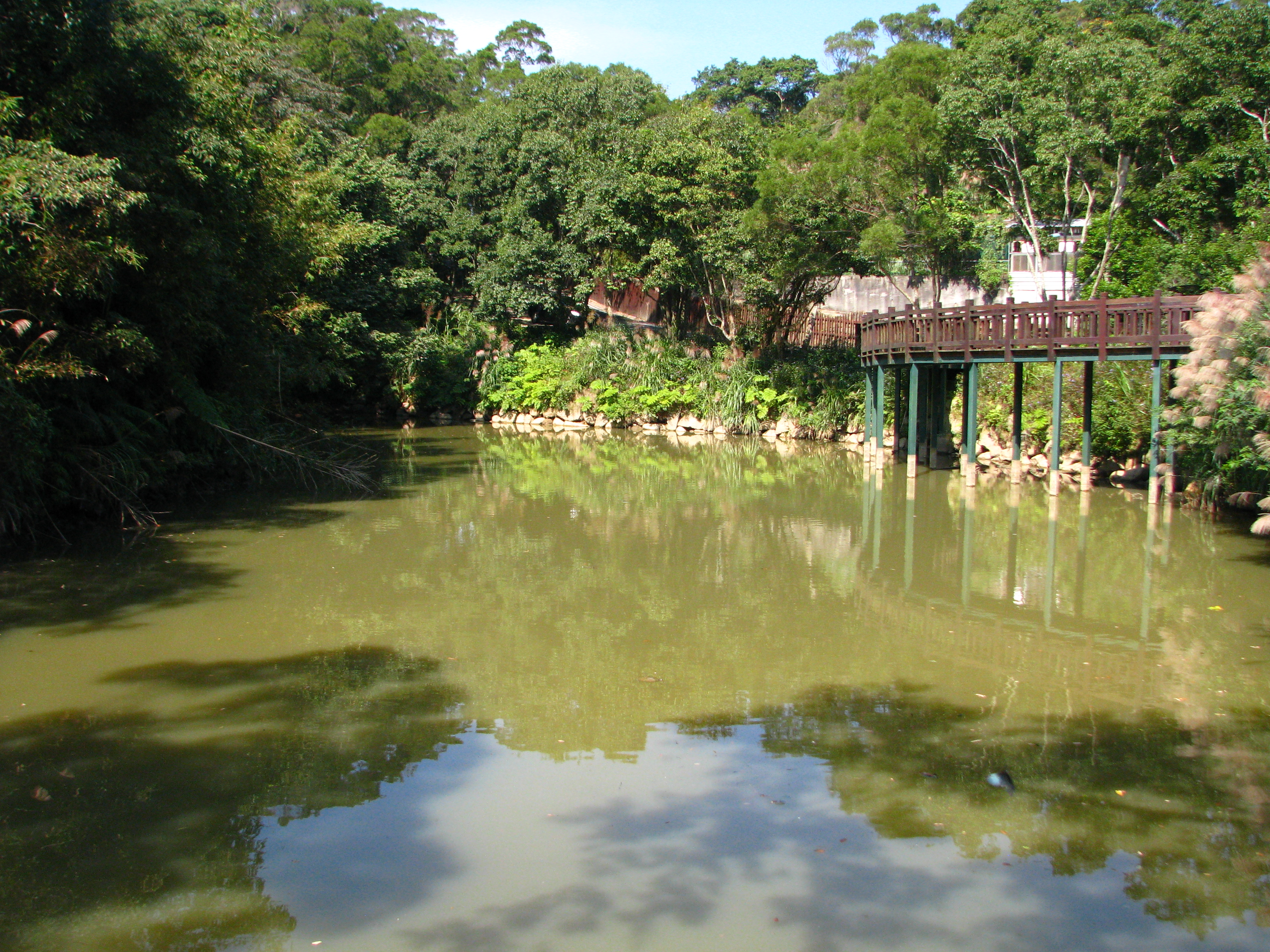

- Taiwan
- Location: Neihu, Taipei, Taiwan
- Coordinates: 25°06′22.5″N 121°35′00.4″E
- Type: lake

The Dalun Lake (traditional Chinese: 大崙湖; simplified Chinese: 大仑湖; pinyin: Dàlún Hú) is a lake in Neihu District, Taipei, Taiwan.

== Transportation ==
The lake is accessible north of Neihu Park Station of Taipei Metro.

== See also ==
- Geography of Taiwan
- List of lakes of Taiwan
