= Xiangyang National Forest Recreation Area =

Forest in Haiduan, Taitung County, Taiwan

Xiangyang National Forest Recreation Area Chinese: 向阳国家森林游乐区
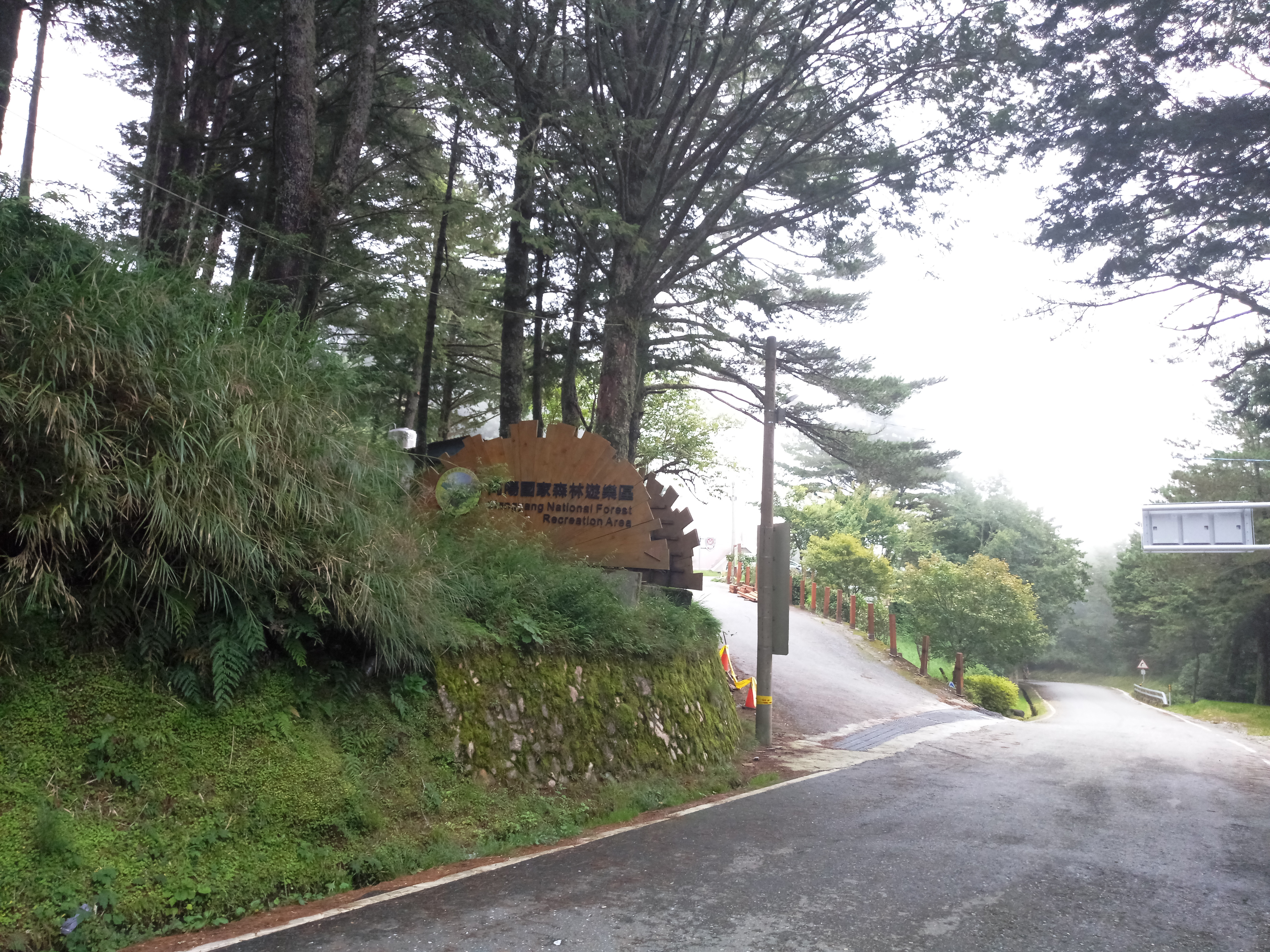

- Location within Taitung County
- Interactive map of Xiangyang National Forest Recreation Area

Geography
- Location: Haiduan, Taitung County, Taiwan
- Coordinates: 23°15′53.4″N 120°59′12.6″E
- Elevation: 2,320―2,700 meters
- Area: 362 ha (890 acres)

Xiangyang National Forest Recreation Area (traditional Chinese: 向陽國家森林遊樂區; simplified Chinese: 向阳国家森林游乐区; pinyin: Xiàngyáng Guójiā Sēnlín Yóulè Qū) is a forest in Lidao Village, Haiduan Township, Taitung County, Taiwan.

== Geography ==
The forest is located at an altitude of 2,320―2,700 meters above sea level and spans over an area of 362 hectares. It has an annual average temperature of 11.4°C. The main vegetations of the forest are pine trees, masters pine trees and red cypress trees.

== Architecture ==
The forest consists of four trails, which are Xiangyang Trail, Songjing Trail, Xiangsong Trail and Songtao Trail. Two of the trails are connected to Jiaminghu National Trail.

== See also ==
- Geography of Taiwan
