= Taitung Forest Park =

Park in Taitung City, Taitung County, Taiwan

- 台東森林公園
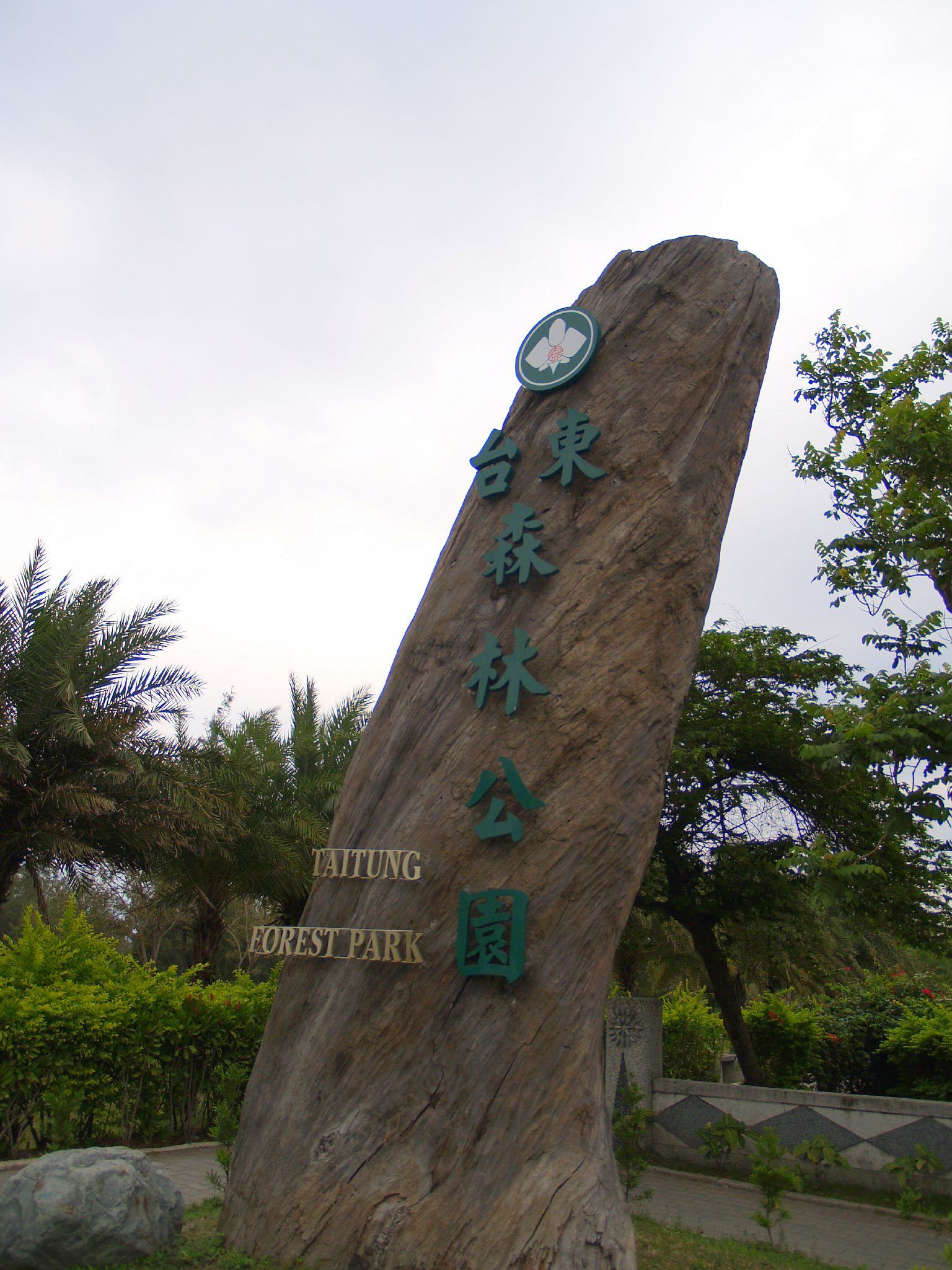
- Interactive map of Taitung Forest Park
- Type: park
- Location: Taitung City, Taitung County, Taiwan
- Coordinates: 22.767213°N 121.157889°E
- Area: 280 hectares (690 acres)

Taitung Forest Park (traditional Chinese: 台東森林公園; simplified Chinese: 台东森林公园; pinyin: Táidōng Sēnlín Gōngyuán) is a park at Taitung City, Taitung County, Taiwan.

== Name ==
The park is nicknamed the Black Forest by the local residents due to its immense dark beefwood trees.

== History ==
On 18 February 2021, an unmanned aerial vehicle belonged to National Chung-Shan Institute of Science and Technology which took off from Chihhang Air Base crash landed at the park.

== Geology ==
The park has an area of 280 hectares, which consists of lakes, one of them is Pipa Lake. The lake is the habitat for aquatic animals and plants. There are also viewing platform and cabin for waterfowl viewing, as well as other activities such as walking or cycling along the bike trail.

== Transportation ==
The park is accessible South East from Taitung Station of the Taiwan Railway.

== See also ==
- List of parks in Taiwan
