= Dongyuan Wetland =

Wetland in Mudan, Pingtung County, Taiwan

- 東源濕地 (Chinese)
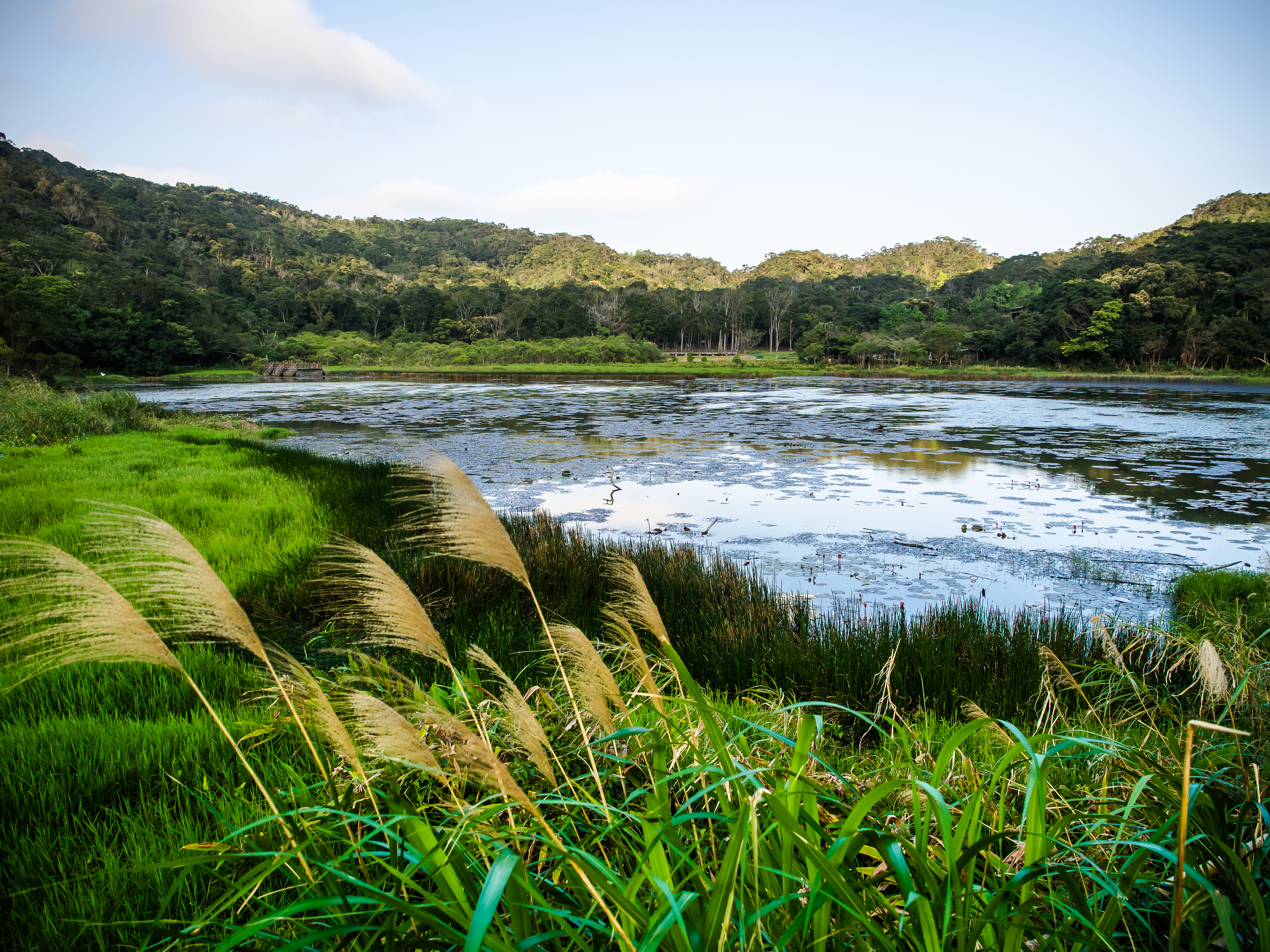

- Location within Pingtung County
- Location: Mudan, Pingtung County, Taiwan
- Coordinates: 22°12′19.7″N 120°51′18.2″E
- Type: wetland
- First flooded: 1995
- Surface area: 1.12 square kilometres (0.43 sq mi)

The Dongyuan Wetland (traditional Chinese: 東源濕地; simplified Chinese: 东源湿地; pinyin: Dōngyuán Shīdì) is a wetland in Mudan Township, Pingtung County, Taiwan.

== History ==
The wetland area used to be a rice farmland. After the construction of Mudan Dam in 1995, the area was submerged by the reservoir the dam created and the land evolved into wetland.

== Geology ==
The wetland spans over an area of 1.12 km^{2} and is a conservation area.

== See also ==
- Geography of Taiwan
