= Baoshan Dam =

Dam in Baoshan, Hsinchu County, Taiwan

Baoshan Dam 寶山壩
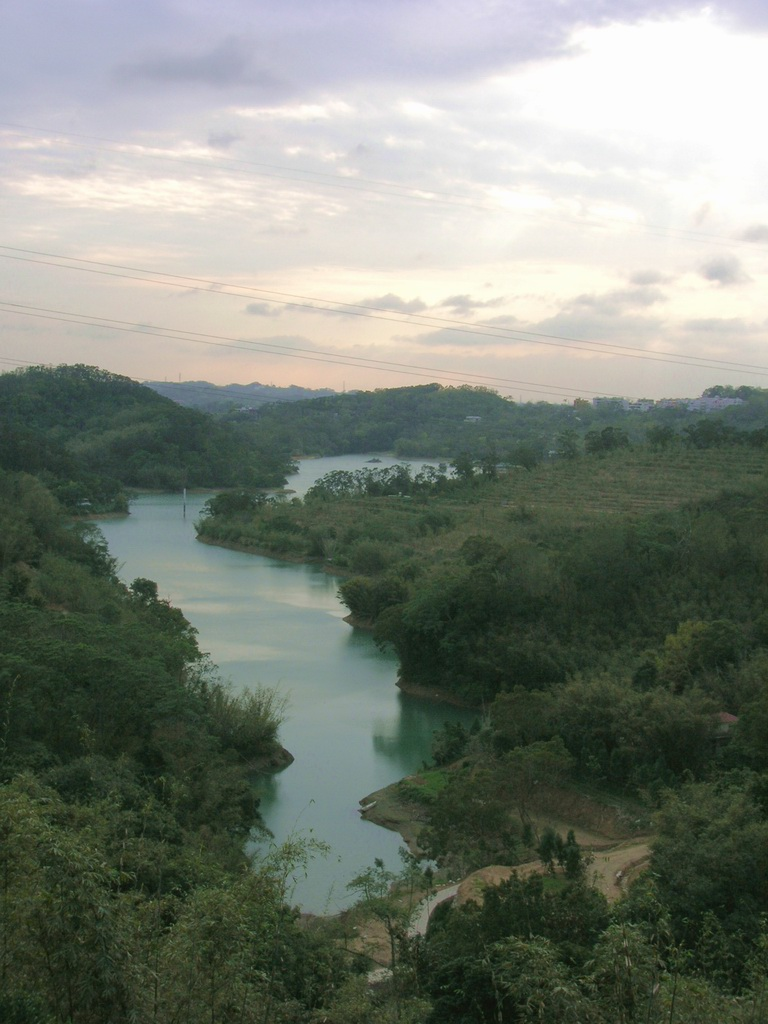
- Baoshan Reservoir

- Location within Hsinchu County
- Location: Baoshan, Hsinchu County, Taiwan
- Coordinates: 24°44′57.5″N 121°02′35″E
- Purpose: Water supply
- Status: Operational
- Construction began: 1981; 45 years ago
- Opening date: 1984; 42 years ago

Dam and spillways
- Type of dam: Embankment
- Height: 34.5 m (113 ft)
- Length: 260 m (850 ft)
- Width (crest): 10 m (33 ft)

Reservoir
- Total capacity: 5,380,000 m^{3} (4,360 acre⋅ft)
- Catchment area: 3.2 km^{2} (1.2 mi^{2})
- Normal elevation: 141.6 m (465 ft)

The Baoshan Dam (traditional Chinese: 寶山壩; simplified Chinese: 宝山坝; pinyin: Bǎoshān Bà; Pe̍h-ōe-jī: Pó-san Chúi-khò͘) is a dam located in Baoshan Township, Hsinchu County, Taiwan. The dam supplies water to Hsinchu City and cooling water to factories in Hsinchu Science and Industrial Park.

== History ==
The dam was initially constructed in 1981 and completed in 1984.

== Technical specifications ==
The reservoir has an effective capacity of 5,380,000 m^{3}.

== Transportation ==
The dam is accessible south of Shangyuan Station of Taiwan Railway.

== See also ==
- List of dams and reservoirs in Taiwan
- Baoshan Second Dam
