= Meinong Lake =

Lake in Meinong, Kaohsiung, Taiwan

- 美濃湖 (Chinese)
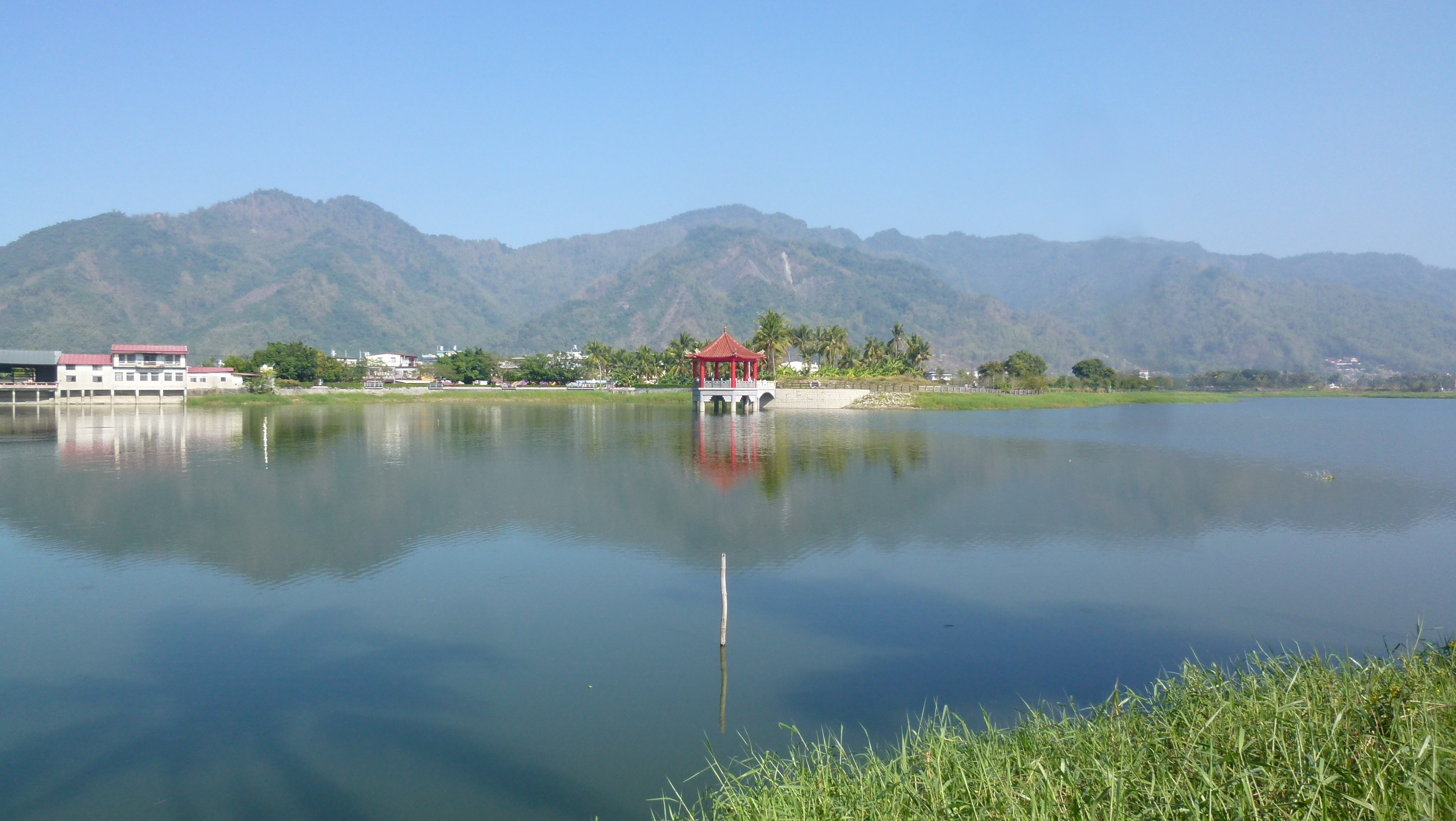

- Location within Kaohsiung
- Location: Meinong, Kaohsiung, Taiwan
- Coordinates: 22°54′26.3″N 120°33′13.7″E
- Type: lake
- Surface area: 21 hectares (52 acres)

The Meinong Lake (traditional Chinese: 美濃湖; simplified Chinese: 美浓湖; pinyin: Měinóng Hú) is a lake and reservoir in Meinong District, Kaohsiung, Taiwan.

== History ==
The lake was originally named as Jhongjun Pi or Minong Lake. In 1956, the lake was renamed to Zhongzheng Lake since the visit of Chiang Kai-shek, and in August 2016, the lake was renamed to Meinong Lake.

== Geology ==
Covers an area of 21 hectares (52 acres), it is the second largest artificial lake in Kaohsiung after Chengcing Lake. It has a capacity to store water for irrigation of over 130 hectares (320 acres) of farmland. It also serves as a fishery. The lake is surrounded by mountain to the west and fields on the other three sides. The lake features trails alongside the lake for cycling or jogging.

== See also ==
- List of tourist attractions in Taiwan
