= Baoshan Second Dam =

Dam in Baoshan, Hsinchu County, Taiwan

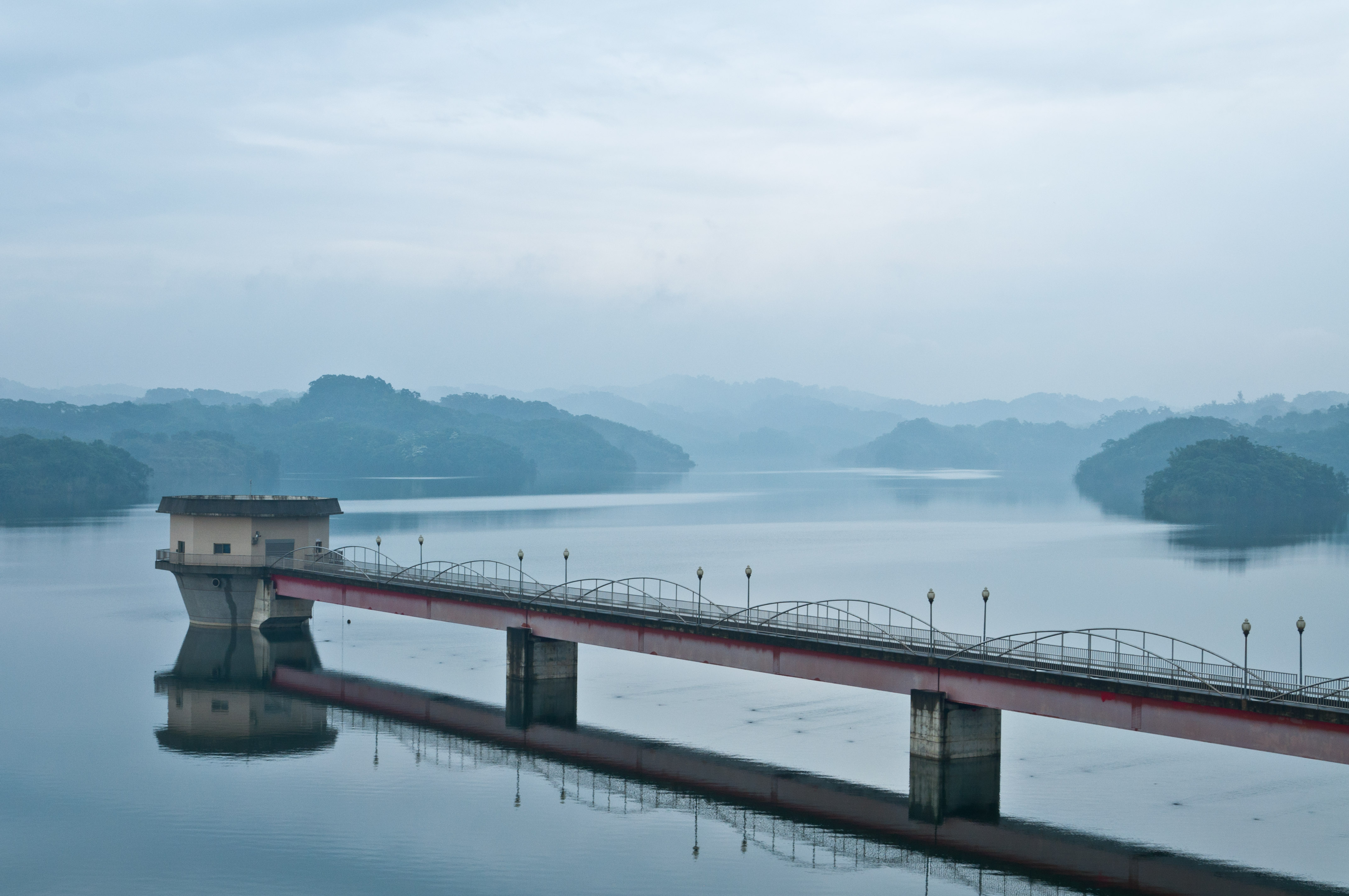

- Location within Hsinchu County
- Interactive map of Baoshan Second Dam
- Official name: 寶山第二水庫
- Location: Baoshan, Hsinchu County, Taiwan
- Coordinates: 24°43′32.9″N 121°03′03.4″E
- Status: Operational
- Construction began: April 1997; 29 years ago
- Opening date: June 2006; 20 years ago

Dam and spillways
- Type of dam: Embankment dam
- Height (foundation): 58 m
- Length: 350 m (1,150 ft)
- Dam volume: 2,052,000 m^{3}
- Spillway type: free overflow

Reservoir
- Total capacity: 31,900,000 m^{3}
- Active capacity: 31,340,000 m^{3}
- Catchment area: 2.88 km^{2}
- Surface area: 1.93 km^{2}
- Maximum water depth: 151.73 m

The Baoshan Second Dam (traditional Chinese: 寶山第二水庫; simplified Chinese: 宝山第二水库; pinyin: Bǎoshān Dì Èr Shuǐkù) is a dam in Baoshan Township, Hsinchu County, Taiwan.

== History ==
In 1986, the planning team of Water Resources Bureau of the Taiwan Provincial Government conducted preliminary study for a dam exploration to alleviate water scarcity problem in Hsinchu County in the future. In 1989, the initial planning to construct the dam began and the feasibility study started in 1993. In 1995, the Project Plan for the Second Baoshan Reservoir in Hsinchu County was proposed. The construction began in April 1997 and completed in June 2006. In 2020, the government announced that it would increase the height of the dam to increase the total water supply of Taiwan.

== Technical specifications ==
The dam is an embankment type of dam. It spans over 58 meters high, 350 meters long with a volume of 2,052,000 m^{3}. It produces a reservoir with a catchment area of 2.88 km^{2}, full water level area of 1.93 km^{2} and a maximum depth of 151.73 meters. It has a total capacity of 31,900,000 m^{3} with effective capacity of 31,340,000 m^{3}.

== See also ==
- List of dams and reservoirs in Taiwan
- Baoshan Dam
