= Cuifeng Lake =

Lake in Nan'ao, Yilan County, Taiwan

- 翠峰湖 (Chinese)
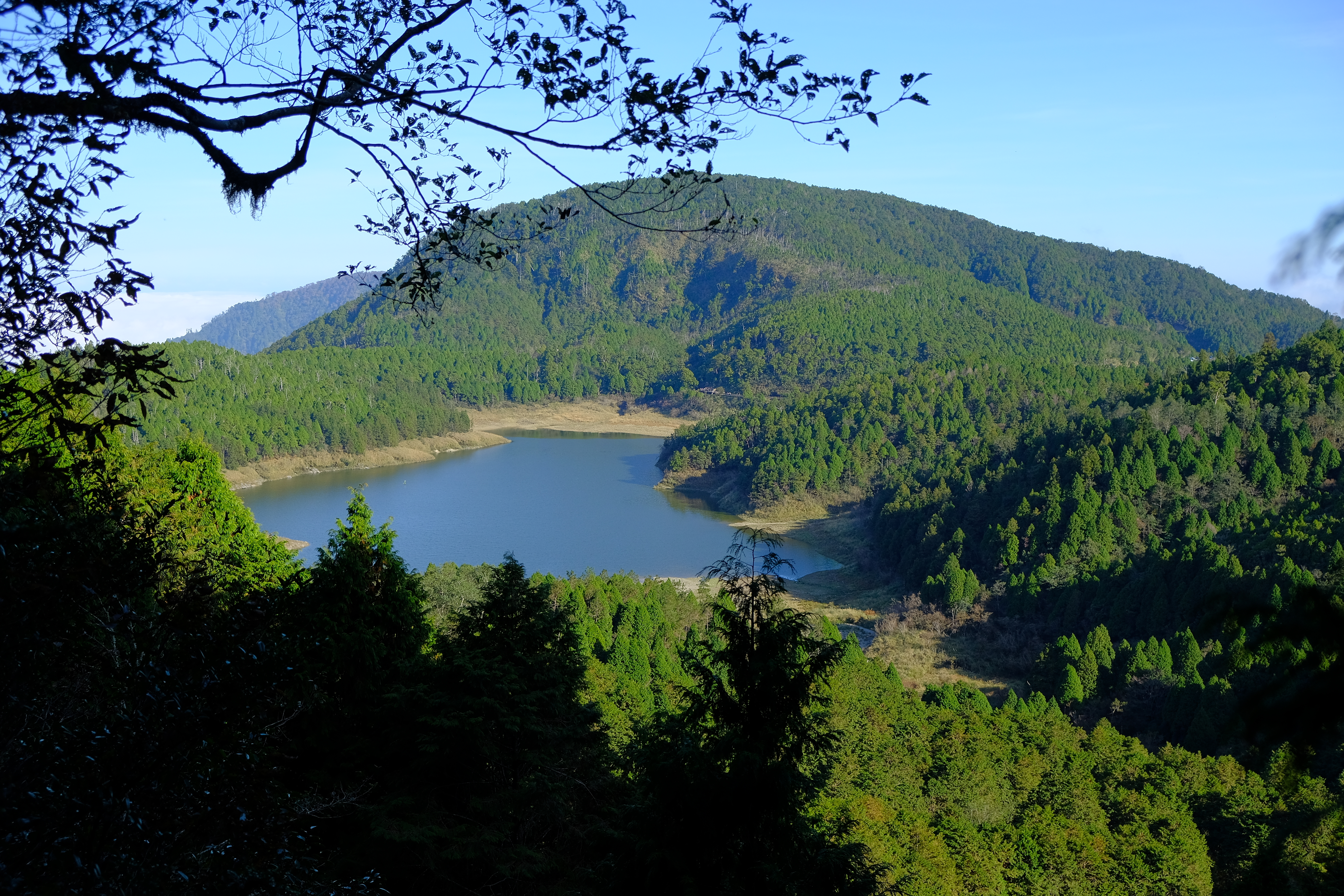

- Taiwan
- Location: Nan'ao, Yilan County, Taiwan
- Coordinates: 24°30′52.5″N 121°36′24.8″E
- Type: lake
- Surface area: 25 hectares (0.097 sq mi)
- Surface elevation: 1,900 metres (1.2 miles)

Cuifeng Lake (Chinese: 翠峰湖; pinyin: Cuìfēng Hú) is a lake in the Taipingshan National Forest Recreation Area in Nan'ao Township, Yilan County, Taiwan. The lake was once known as 晴峰埤仔 and 晴峰湖.

== Geography ==
The lake is the largest alpine lake in Taiwan, located at an altitude of 1,900 meters. The lake covers an area of 20 hectares. Its water is clear and unpolluted. During rainy season, the area of the lake can reach up to 25 hectares.

== Architecture ==
The lake features walking trails with a total length of 3.95 km at an elevation of 1,900–2,000 meters. Along the trail is the Qingfeng Exhibition Warehouse which was renovated from a former train fuel storage building.

== See also ==
- Geography of Taiwan
