= Da'an River =

River in Taiwan

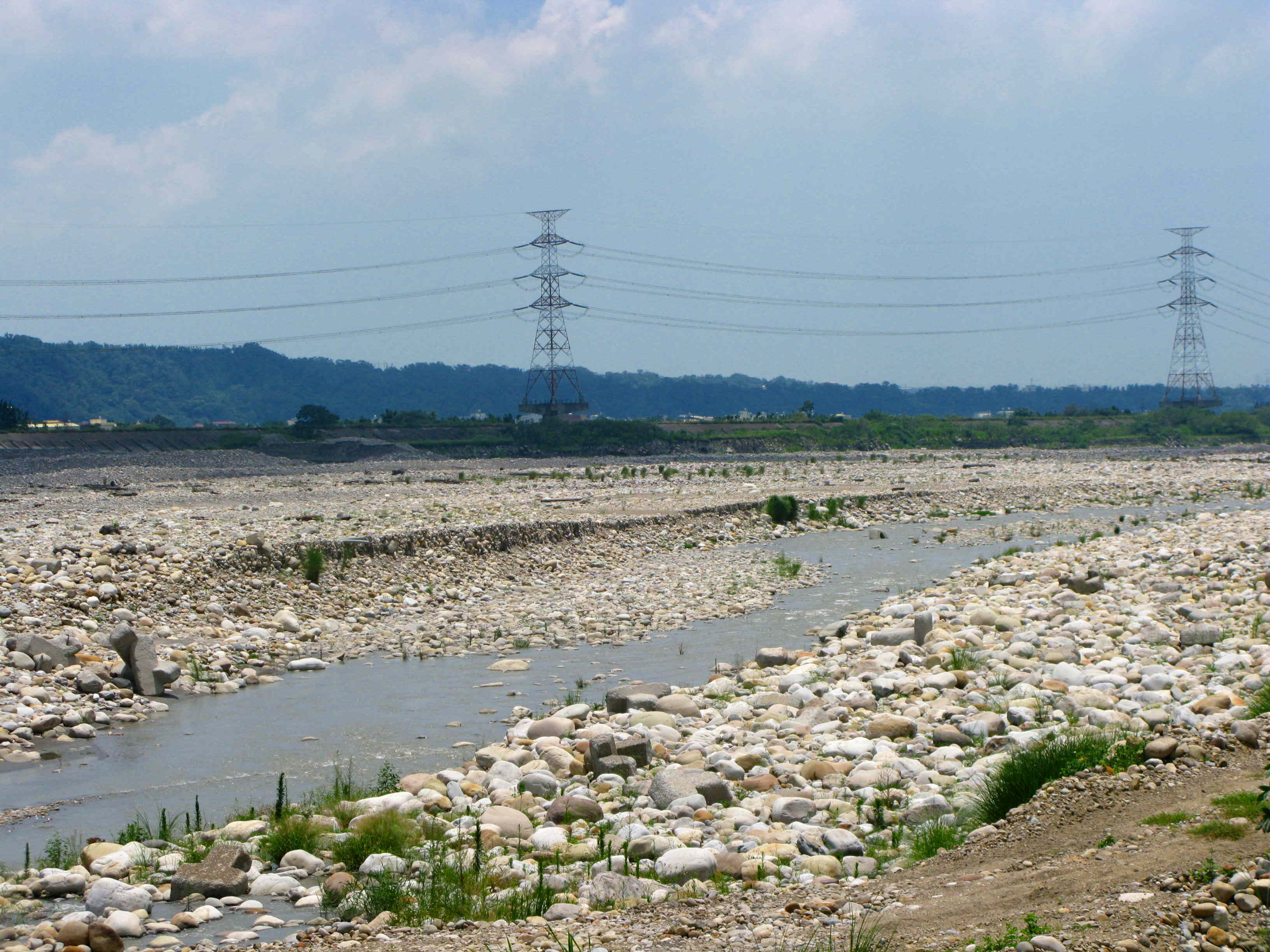

- Da'an River in Taiwan
- Native name: 大安溪 (Chinese)

Location
- Country: Taiwan

Physical characteristics
- Source
  - location: Xueshan Range: Dabajian Mountain
  - coordinates: 24°25′16.8″N 121°08′27.4″E
  - elevation: 3,488 m (11,444 ft)
- Mouth
  - location: Taiwan Strait
  - coordinates: 24.4072°N 120.5931°E
- Length: 105 km (65 mi)
- Basin size: 758.47 km^{2} (292.85 sq mi)
- Discharge
  - maximum: 13,840 m^{3}/s (489,000 cu ft/s)

The Da'an River (Chinese: 大安溪; pinyin: Dà'ān Xī) is a river in northwestern Taiwan. It is the seventh-longest river on the island, it flows through Miaoli County and Taichung City for 105 kilometres (65 mi). It reaches the Taiwan Strait between the Dajia District and Da'an District, Taichung.

The Da'an River was affected by the 1999 Jiji earthquake, where a gorge was formed (called Da'an River Grand Canyon Chinese: 大安溪大峽谷). In some of the fastest erosion geologists have ever seen, the gorge is being eaten away from its upstream end at a rate of 17 meters per year. They expect the gorge to be erased after 50 years.

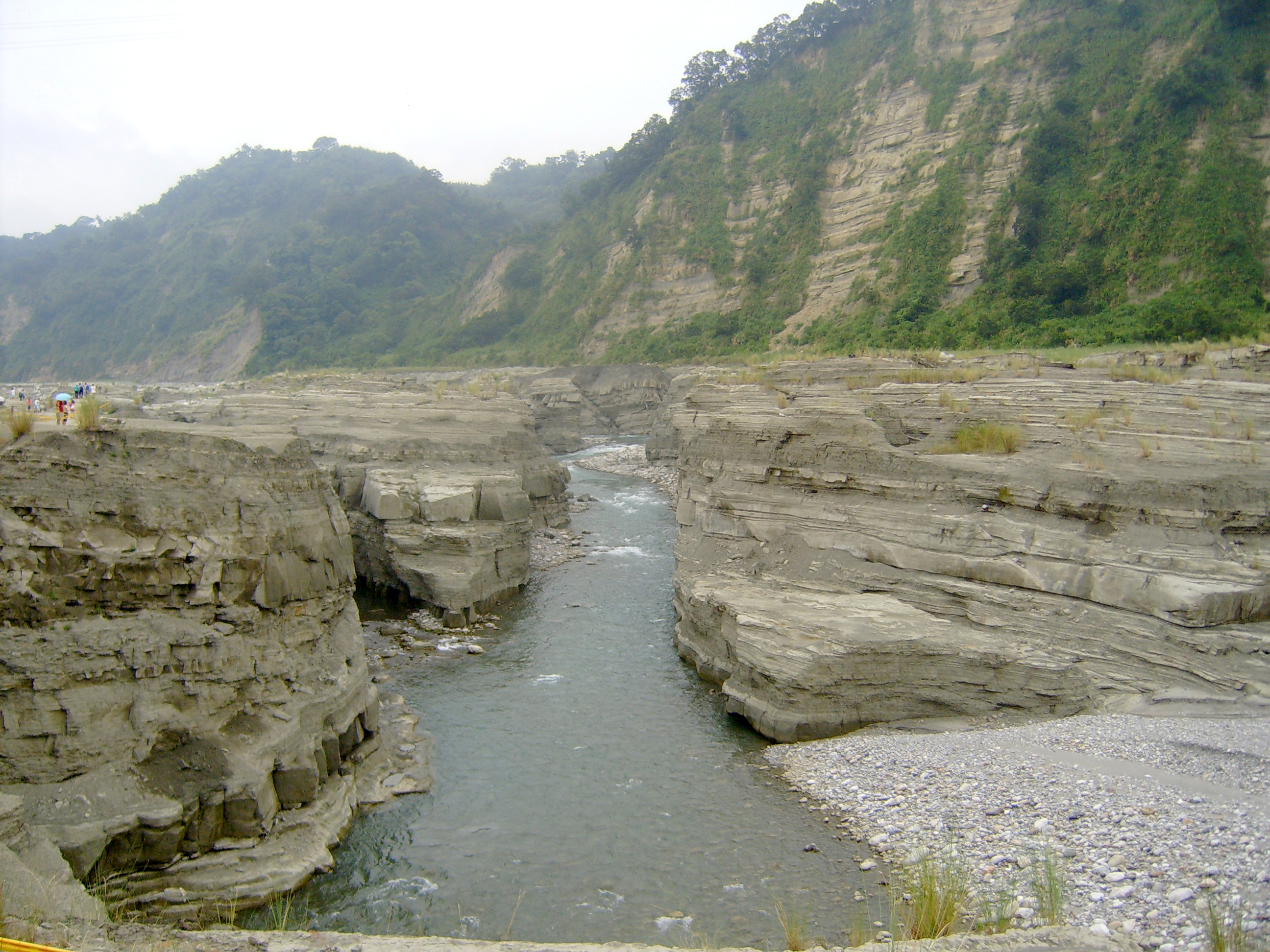
Da'an River "Grand Canyon"

== See also ==
- List of rivers in Taiwan
