= Mudan, Pingtung =

Mountain indigenous township in Pingtung County, Taiwan

Coordinates: 22°9′33″N 120°48′56″E

Mudan Township 牡丹鄉
- Mountain indigenous township
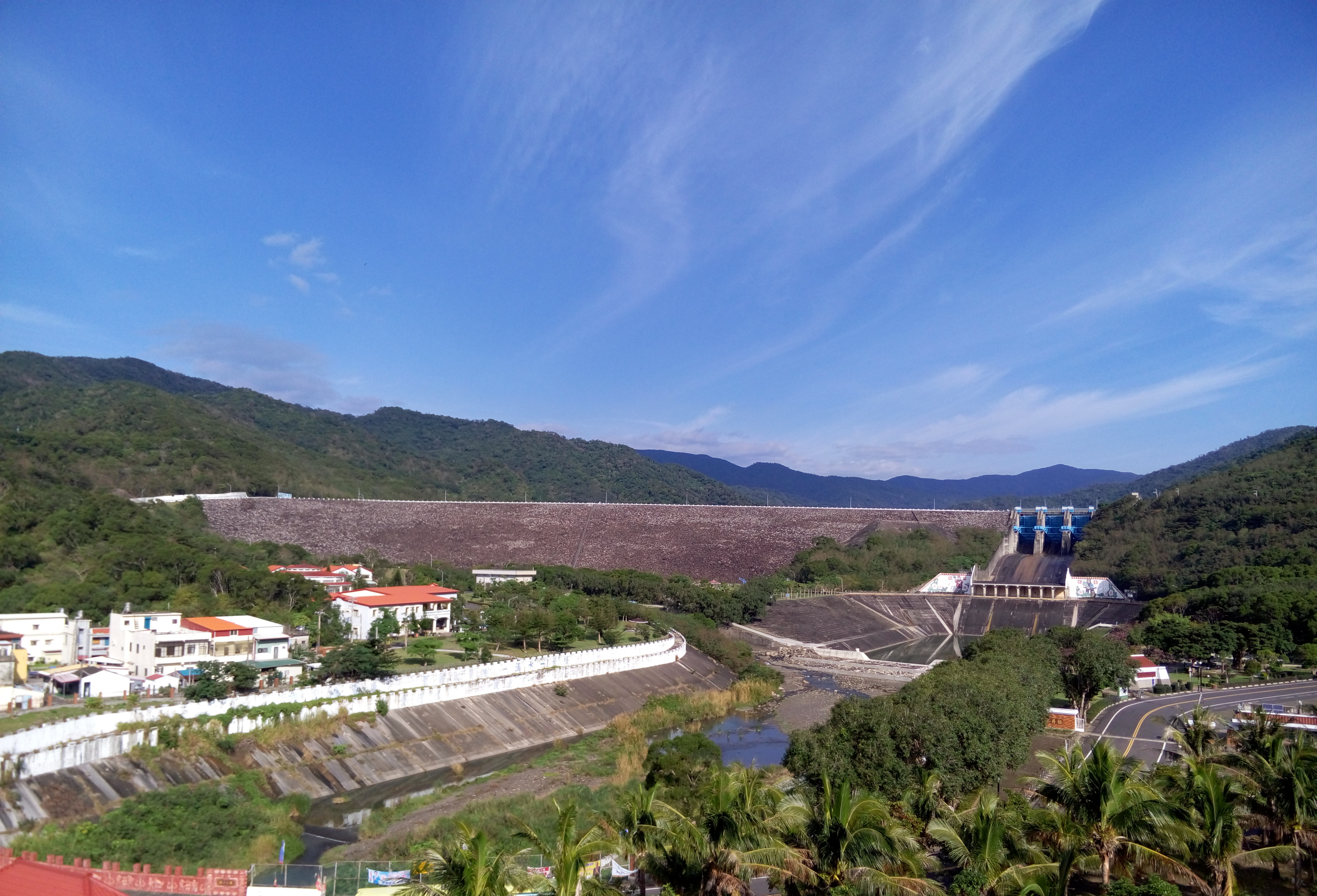

- Mudan Township in Pingtung County
- Location: Pingtung County, Taiwan

Area
  - Total: 182 km^{2} (70 sq mi)

Population (February 2024)
  - Total: 4,750
  - Density: 26.1/km^{2} (67.6/sq mi)

Mudan Township (Chinese: 牡丹鄉; pinyin: Mǔdān Xiāng; Wade–Giles: Mu^{3}-tan^{1} Hsiang^{1}; Pe̍h-ōe-jī: Bó͘-tan-hiong) is a mountain indigenous township in Pingtung County, Taiwan. The main population is the Paiwan people of the Taiwanese aborigines.

== History ==
Formerly called Botansia (Chinese: 牡丹社; Pe̍h-ōe-jī: Bó͘-tan-siā).

== Geography ==
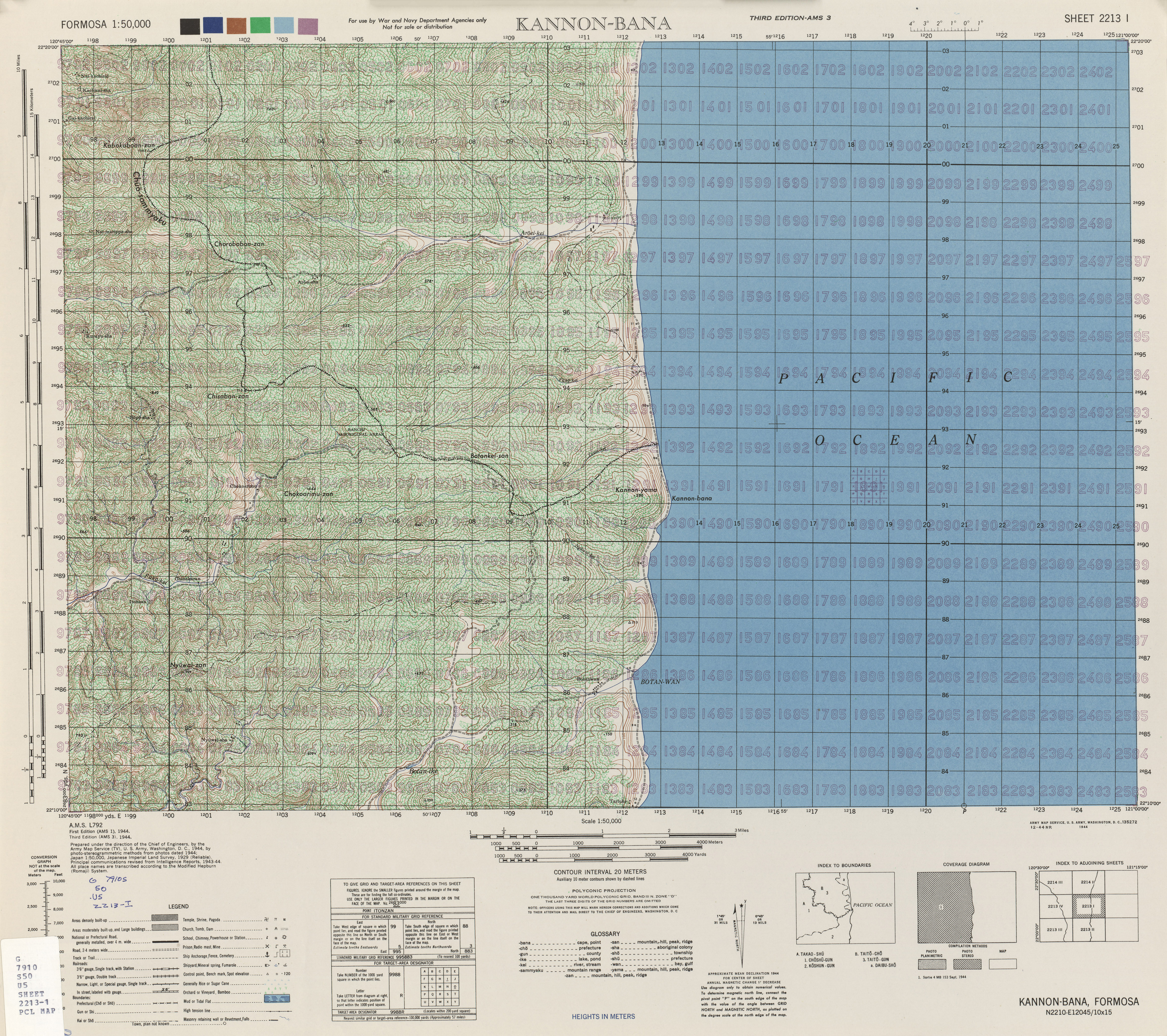
Map including part of the coast of Mudan (AMS, 1944)

- Area: 181.83 square kilometres (70.20 sq mi)
- Population: 4,750 people (February 2024)

== Administrative divisions ==
The township comprises six villages: Gaoshi, Mudan, Shimen, Silin, Tungyuan and Xuhai.

== Infrastructures ==
- Mudan Dam

== Tourist attractions ==
- Dongyuan Wetland
- Gaoshi Shrine
- Shihmen Historical Battle Field

== See also ==
- Mudan Incident (1871)
