= Longluan Lake =

Lake in Hengchun, Pingtung County, Taiwan

- 龍鑾潭 (Chinese)
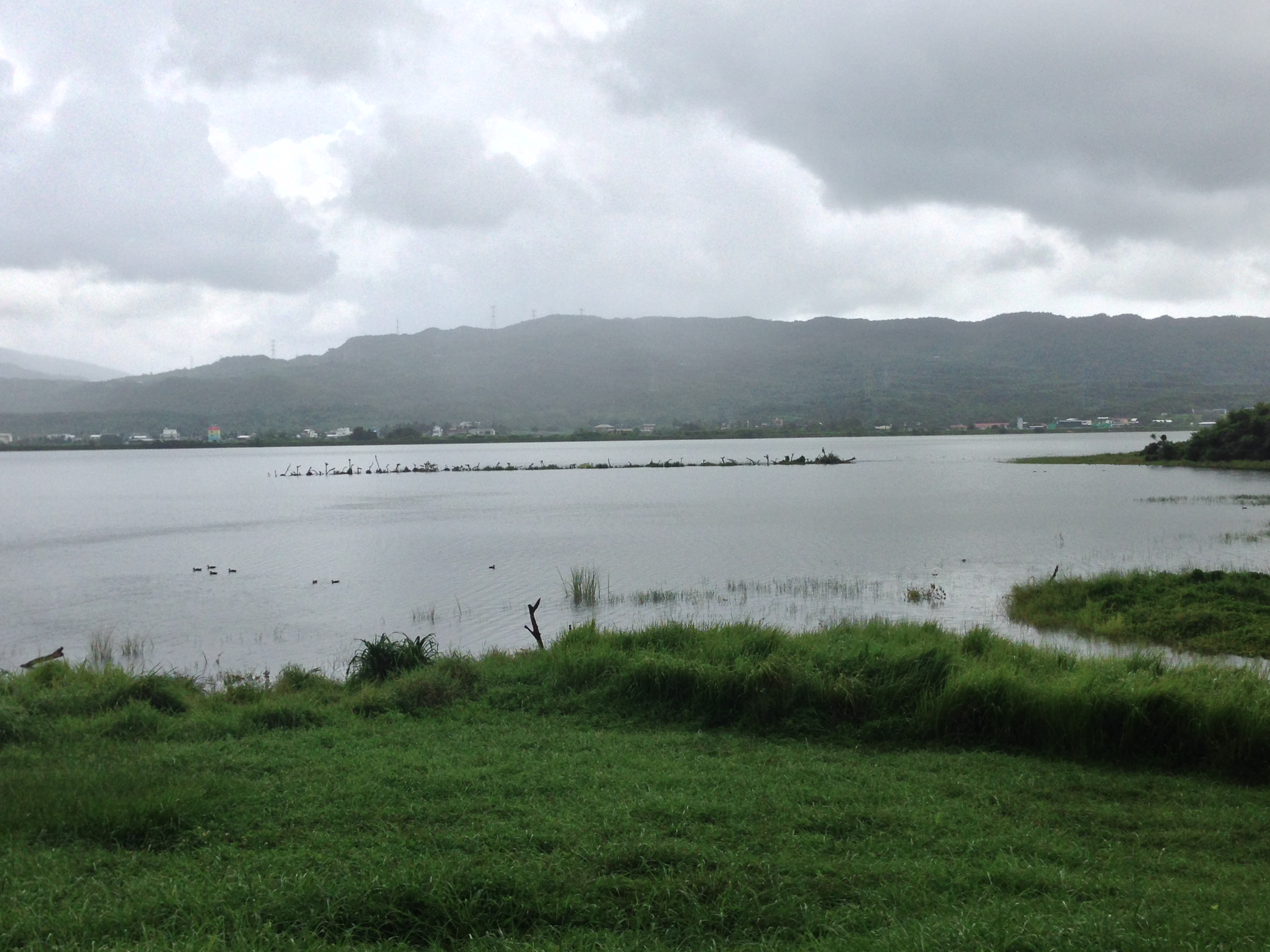

- Location within Pingtung County
- Location: Hengchun, Pingtung County, Taiwan
- Coordinates: 21°58′40.6″N 120°44′36.5″E
- Type: lake
- Surface area: 175 hectares (430 acres)
- Average depth: 3.5 meters (11 ft)

Longluan Lake (traditional Chinese: 龍鑾潭; simplified Chinese: 龙銮潭; pinyin: Lóngluán Tán) is a lake in Kenting National Park, Hengchun Township, Pingtung County, Taiwan.

== History ==
To solve the flooding problem around the lake area, the government built barriers on the eastern and northern sides of the lake where the elevations are relatively lower.

== Geology ==
The lake lies in a low-laying area which is prone to flooding during rainy seasons. With a span area of 175 hectares (430 acres) and an average depth of 3.5 meters (11 ft), the lake is the biggest fresh water lake in Taiwan. The lake is surrounded by various vegetation and it consists of various water animals, such as fishes and shrimps. During winter times, the lake area become the place for migratory birds.

== Architecture ==
The Longluan Lake Natural Center is located on the western edge of the lake. It exhibits information on birds ecology in Taiwan.

== See also ==
- Geography of Taiwan
