= Mudan Dam =

Dam in Mudan, Pingtung County, Taiwan

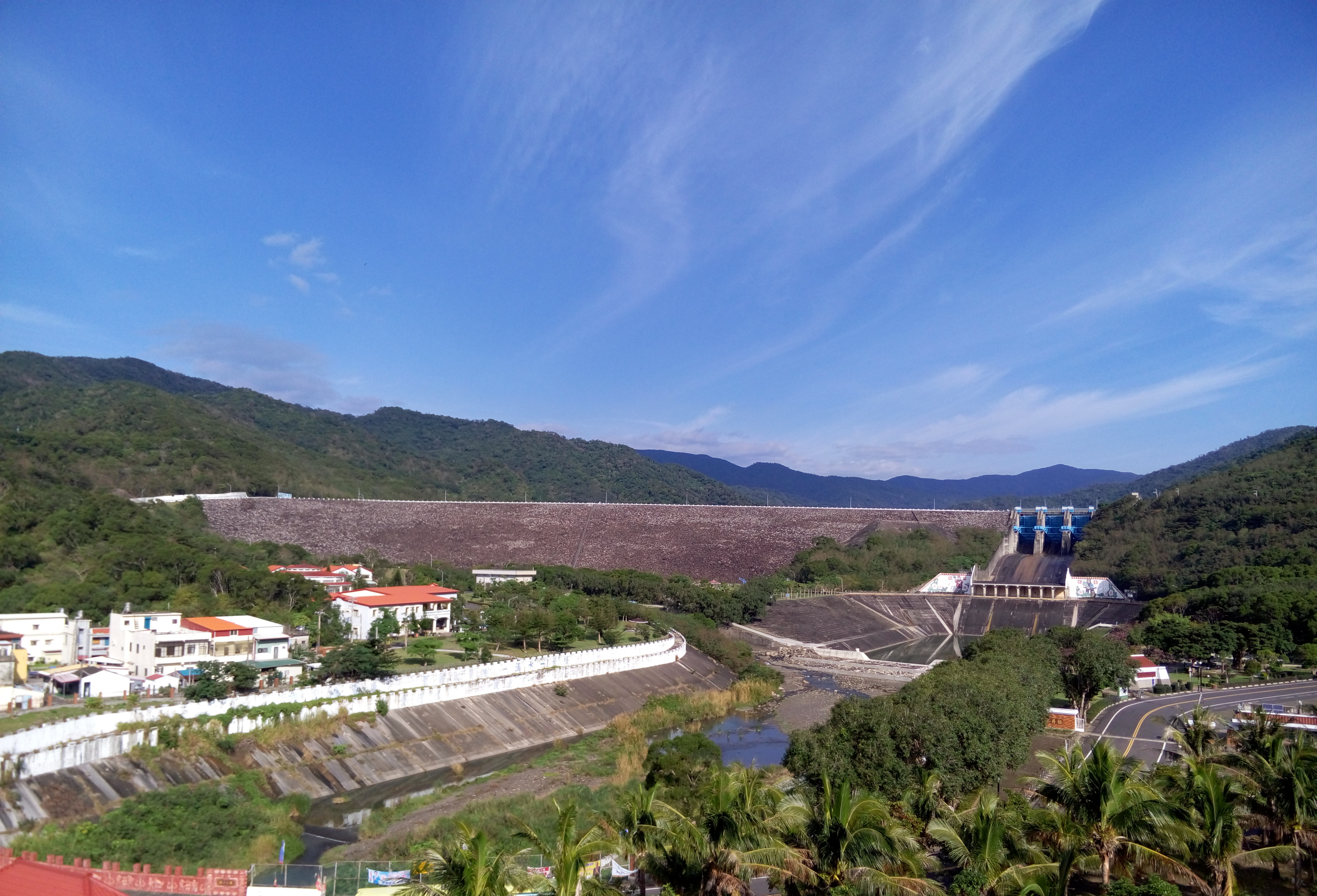

- Location within Pingtung County
- Official name: 牡丹水壩
- Location: Mudan, Pingtung County, Taiwan
- Coordinates: 22°07′57.3″N 120°47′04.0″E
- Status: Operational
- Construction began: 1989; 37 years ago
- Opening date: 1995; 31 years ago

Dam and spillways
- Type of dam: Earth fill dam
- Height: 65.0 m (213.3 ft)
- Length: 445.6 m (1,462 ft)
- Width (crest): 10.0 m
- Spillway type: floodgate-controlled

Reservoir
- Total capacity: 31,400,000 m^{3} (25,500 acre⋅ft)
- Active capacity: 27,930,000 m^{3} (22,640 acre⋅ft)
- Catchment area: 69.2 km^{2} (26.7 mi^{2})
- Maximum water depth: 142 m

The Mudan Dam (traditional Chinese: 牡丹水壩; simplified Chinese: 牡丹水坝; pinyin: Mǔdān Shuǐbà) is a dam in Mudan Township, Pingtung County, Taiwan. It forms the largest reservoir in Pingtung County.

== History ==
The construction of the dam began in 1989 and was completed in 1995. In early November 2020, the dam released its water in preparation for the upcoming Typhoon Atsani.

== Technical details ==
The reservoir collects water from Rureng Creek and Mudan Creek. The surface area of its catchment is 60 km^{2} with a total effective storage capacity of 27,930,000 m^{3}. It supplies water for domestic and agriculture water demands in Checheng, Fangliao, Fangshan, Hengchun, Manzhou and Mudan Townships, as well as public water around Kenting National Park.

== See also ==
- List of dams and reservoirs in Taiwan
