= Jinshi Lake =

Lake in Sanmin, Kaohsiung, Taiwan

- 金獅湖 (Chinese)
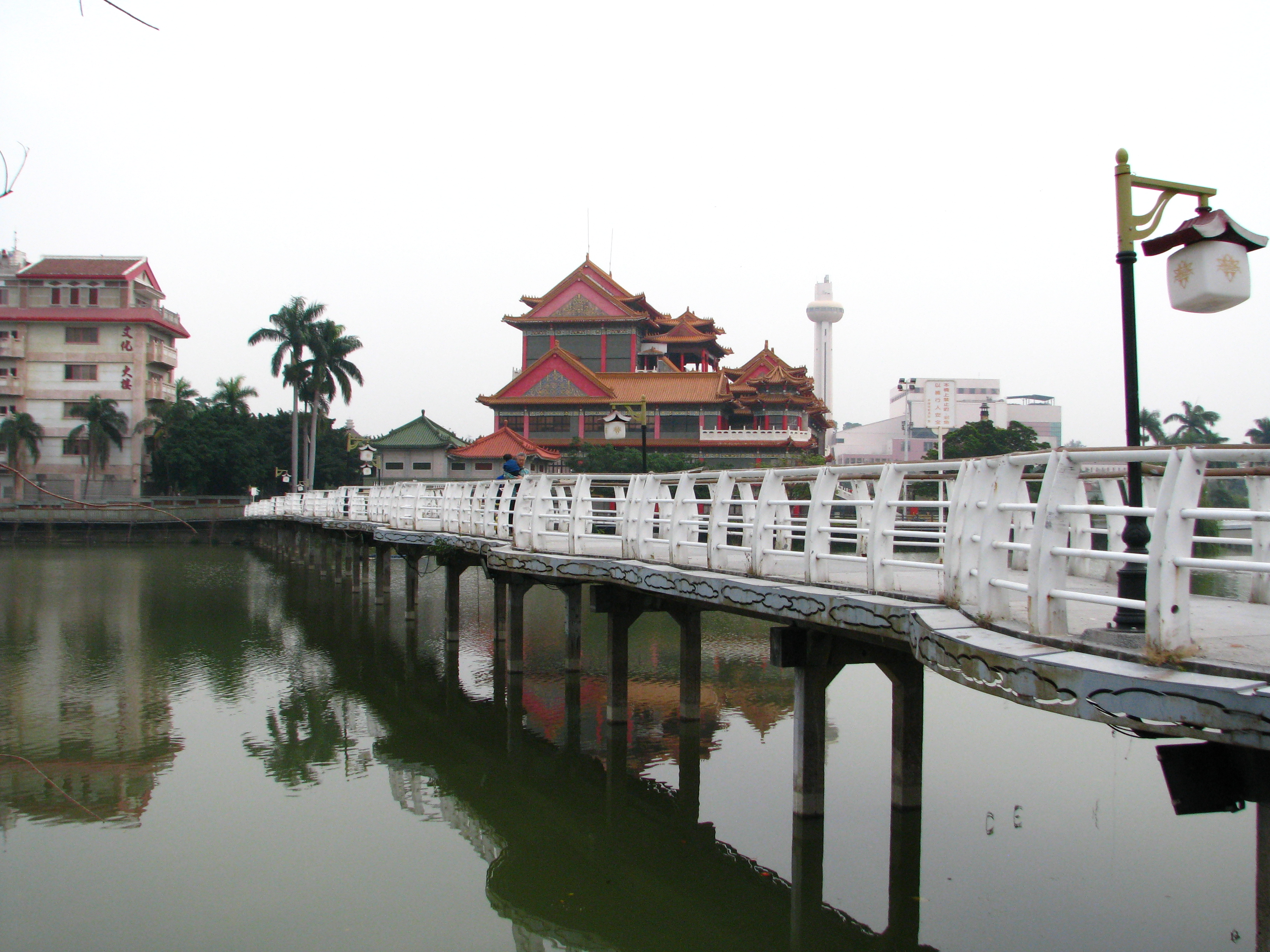

- Location within Kaohsiung
- Location: Sanmin, Kaohsiung, Taiwan
- Coordinates: 22°39′59.8″N 120°19′33.2″E
- Type: lake
- Primary inflows: Dingjin Canal
- Primary outflows: Love River, Taiwan Strait
- Surface area: 11 hectares (27 acres)

The Jinshi Lake (Golden Lion Lake, Chinese: 金獅湖; pinyin: Jīnshī Hú) is a lake in Sanmin District, Kaohsiung, Taiwan.

== History ==
The lake used to be known as Dapi Lake. However, due to its location next to Mount Shi (Chinese: 獅山), the lake is called Jinshi Lake.

== Geology ==
The water source of the lake comes from Dingjin Canal at the east side of the freeway and the lake water flows into Port of Kaohsiung through the escape canal and the Love River. The lake covers an area of around 11 hectares. The total area of the land surrounding the lake is around 14 hectares.

== Transportation ==
The lake is accessible by bus from Kaohsiung Arena Station of Kaohsiung MRT.

== See also ==
- Geography of Taiwan
- List of lakes of Taiwan
