= Meihua Lake =

Lake in Dongshan, Yilan County, Taiwan

- 梅花湖 (Chinese)
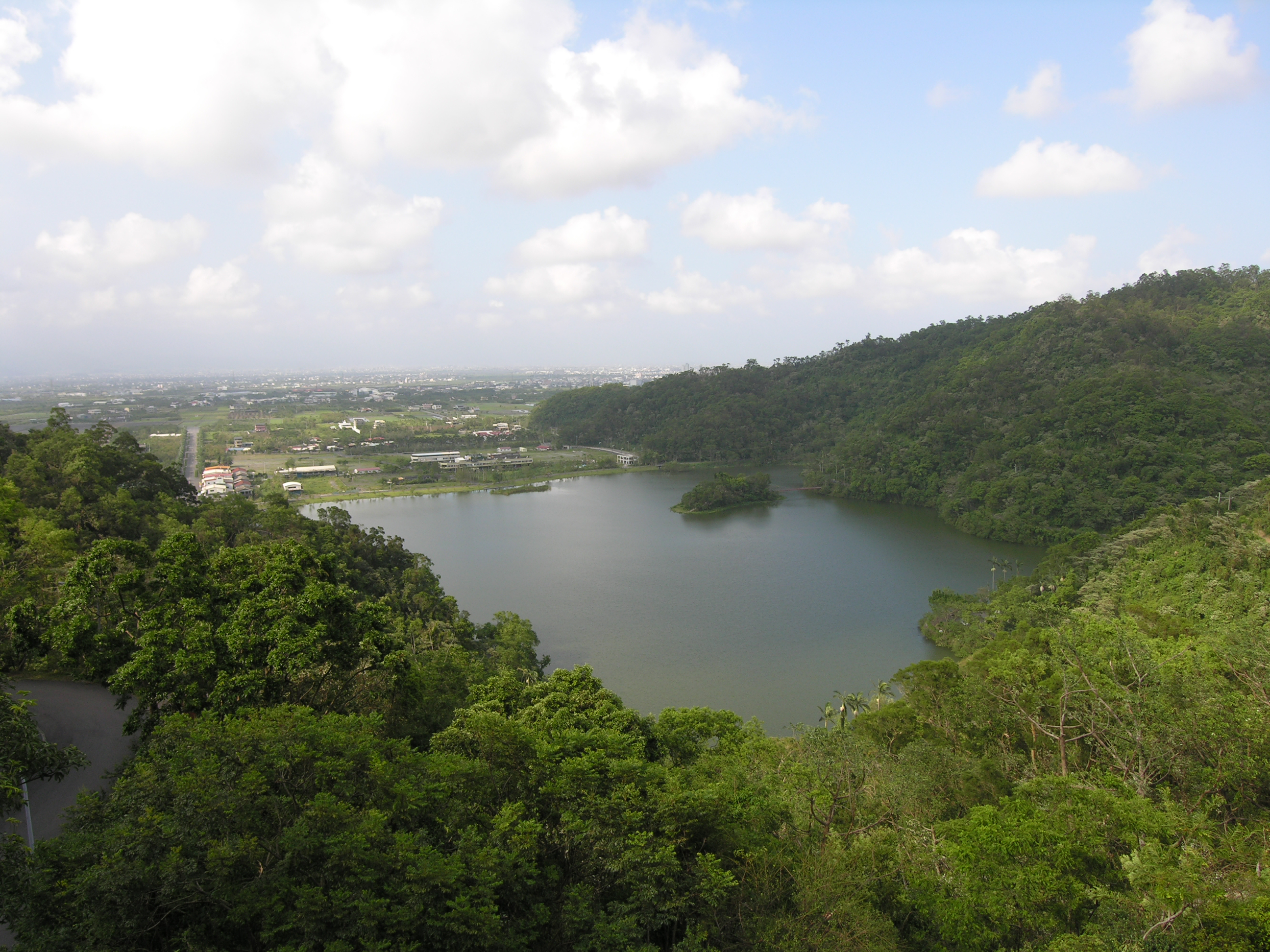

- Taiwan
- Location: Dongshan, Yilan County, Taiwan
- Coordinates: 24°38′34.9″N 121°43′58.0″E
- Type: lake

The Meihua Lake or Plum Blossom Lake (Chinese: 梅花湖; pinyin: Méihuā Hú) is a lake in Dongshan Township, Yilan County, Taiwan.

== Name ==
Meihua means plum blossom because of its resemblance to a plum flower with five petals.

== History ==
The lake was originally named Dapi Lake. In 1970s, President Chiang Ching-kuo visited the area and was impressed by its beauty, hence naming it Meihua Lake.

== Geography ==
There is a small island sits at the center of the lake with a suspension bridge connecting to the circular trail. The lake also has a cycling trail around its perimeter.

== See also ==
- Geography of Taiwan
