= Haiduan =

Mountain indigenous township in Taitung County, Taiwan

Coordinates: 23°06′N 121°11′E

Haiduan Township 海端鄉
- Mountain indigenous township
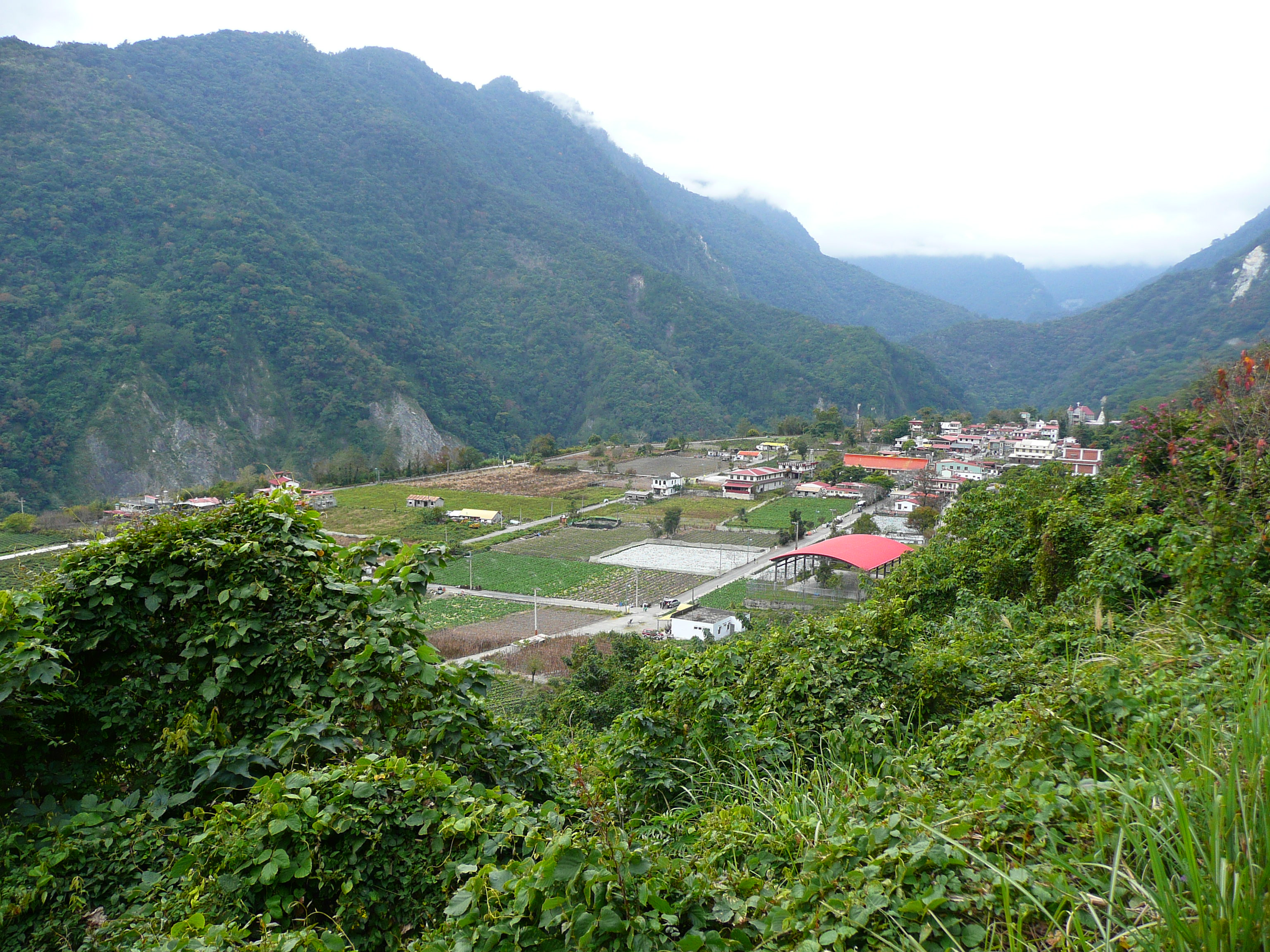

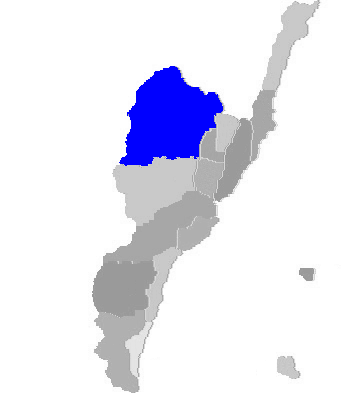
- Taiduan Township in Taitung County
- Location: Taitung County, Taiwan

Area
  - Land: 880 km^{2} (340 sq mi)

Population (February 2023)
  - Total: 4,224

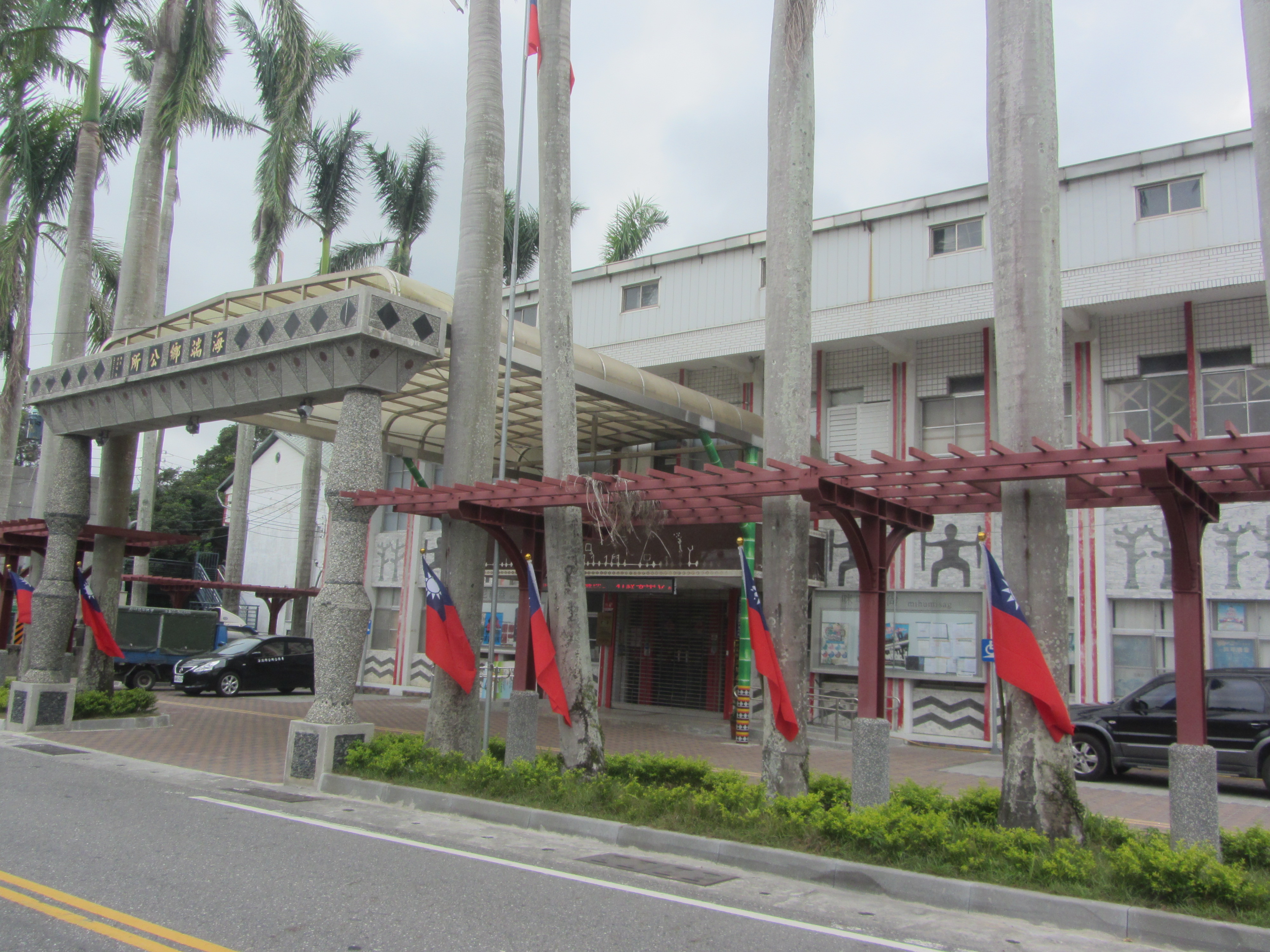
Haiduan Township Office

Haiduan Township (Chinese: 海端鄉; pinyin: Hǎiduān Xiāng; Wade–Giles: Hai^{3}-tuan^{1} Hsiang^{1}) is a mountain indigenous township in Taitung County, Taiwan. It has an area of 880.0382 km^{2}, with a population of 4,224 as of February 2023. The main population is the Bunun people of the Taiwanese aborigines.

== Administrative divisions ==
- Jiana Village
- Kanding Village
- Haiduan Village
- Guangyuan Village
- Wulu Village
- Lidao Village

== Tourist attractions ==
- Bunun Cultural Museum
- Chiaming Lake
- Lisong Hot Spring
- Xiangyang National Forest Recreation Area
- Lidao Scenic Area
- Lidao Settlement
- Pishan Hot Spring
- Tianlong Suspension Bridge
- Wulu Fort
- Wulu Gorge
- Wulu Hot Spring
- Yakou Scenic Area
