= Beinan River =

River in Taitung County, Taiwan

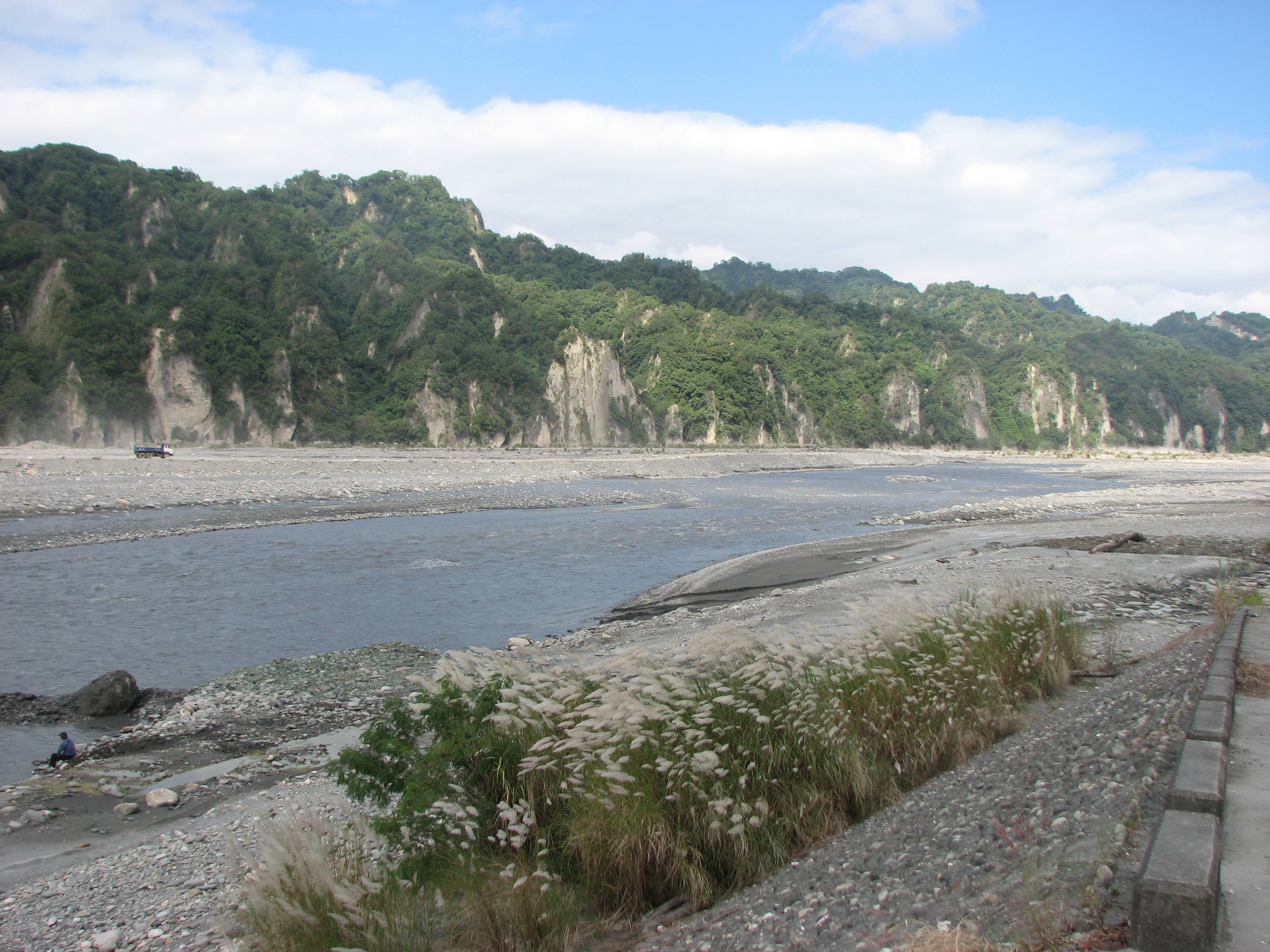
- Native name: 卑南溪 (Chinese)

Location
- Country: Taiwan
- City: Taitung City

Physical characteristics
- Source
  - coordinates: 23°03′03″N 120°52′27″E
  - elevation: 3,293 m (10,804 ft)
- Mouth
  - location: Pacific Ocean
  - coordinates: 22°45′58″N 121°10′34″E
  - elevation: 0 metres (0 ft)
- Length: 84.35 km (52.41 mi)
- Basin size: 1,603.21 km^{2} (619.00 sq mi)
- Discharge
  - average: 94.2 m^{3}/s (3,330 cu ft/s)
  - maximum: 12,800 m^{3}/s (450,000 cu ft/s)

The Beinan River (Chinese: 卑南溪; pinyin: Bēinán Xī; Wade–Giles: Pei^{1}-nan^{2} Hsi^{1}; Pe̍h-ōe-jī: Pi-lâm-khe) is a river in Taiwan. It flows through Taitung County for 84 kilometers.

== See also ==
- List of rivers in Taiwan
