= Sanxia =

Sanxia may refer to:

- Three Gorges, on the Yangtze River in the People's Republic of China
  - Three Gorges Dam
- Sanxia Prison, in Chongqing, People's Republic of China
- Sanxia District, New Taipei, Taiwan
- Sanxia River, a tributary of the Dahan River in New Taipei City, northern Taiwan

== See also ==
- Tam Hiệp (disambiguation)
