= Sanxia Old Street =

Street in Sanxia, New Taipei, Taiwan

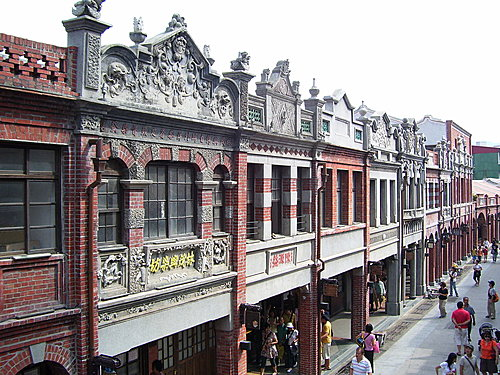

- Location within Taiwan
- Native name: 三峽老街 (Chinese)
- Type: street
- Length: 200 m (660 ft)
- Location: Sanxia, New Taipei, Taiwan
- Coordinates: 24°55′58.9″N 121°22′09.9″E

The Sanxia Old Street (Chinese: 三峽老街; pinyin: Sānxiá Lǎojiē) is located in Sanxia District, New Taipei, Taiwan, centered on Minquan Street on the banks of the Sanxia River.

== History ==
The old street originated in the mid-18th century, as a river port at the confluence of the Dahan River, the Sanxia River, and the Hengxi River. The town developed into a trading hub for camphor, tea, and dyed cloth. The street rebuilt in the 1910s, blending red-brick archways and Baroque-style facades.

A renovation work was carried out starting in 2004 and completed in 2007 to restore the buildings along the street to their early 20th century style. It also includes the establishment of the management committee of the old street.

== Architecture ==
The street spans over a length of 200 meters. Buildings along the street are the baroque-style architecture built during Japanese rule. Zushi Temple is located at one end of the street.

== See also ==
- List of roads in Taiwan
- List of tourist attractions in Taiwan
