= Sanxia District =

District in New Taipei, Taiwan

Sanxia 三峽區 Sankyō, Sansia, Sanhsia
- District
- Sanxia District
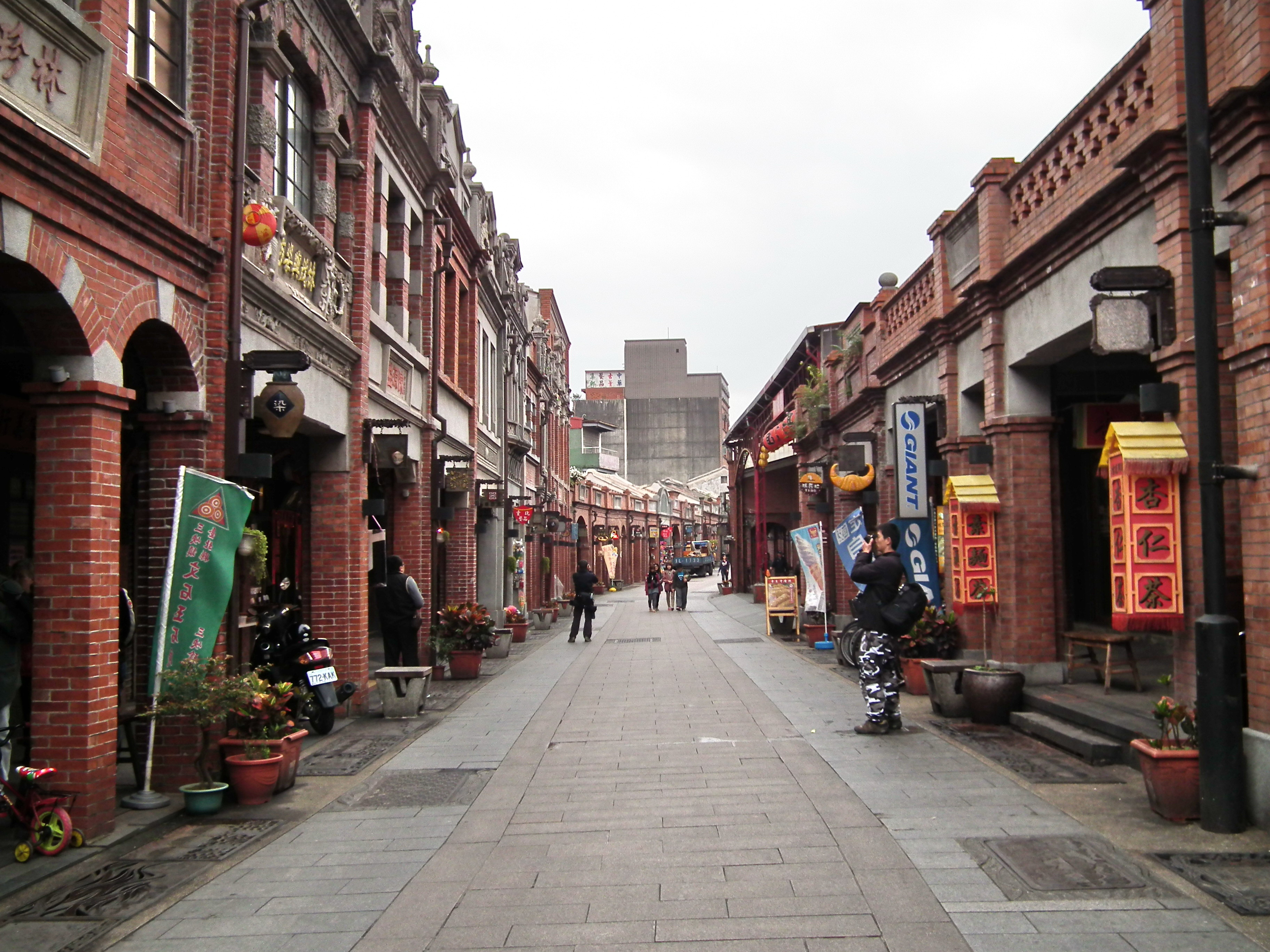
- Sanxia Old Street

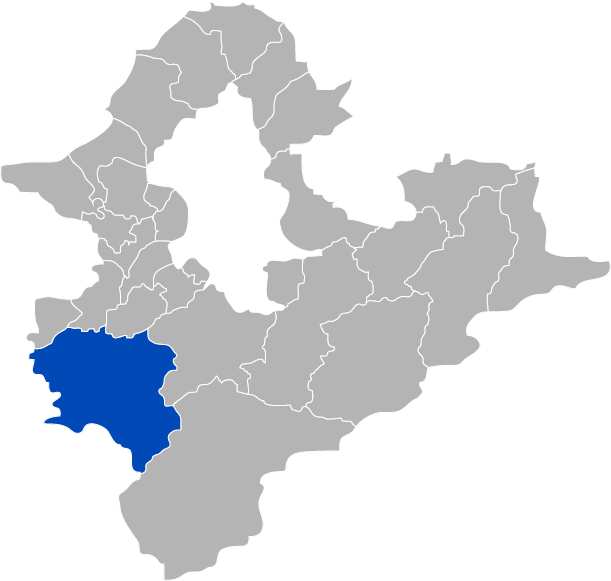
- Location of Sanxia in New Taipei City
- Coordinates: 24°56′00″N 121°22′00″E
- Country: Republic of China (Taiwan)
- Special municipality: New Taipei City
- Established: 1846

Government
  - Mayor: 陳健民(Pe̍h-ōe-jī: Tân Kiān-bîn)

Area
  - Total: 191.45 km^{2} (73.92 sq mi)

Population (February 2023)
  - Total: 115,443
  - Density: 531.9/km^{2} (1,378/sq mi)
- Time zone: UTC+8 (CST)
- ZIP code: 237
- Area code: 02
- Website: www.sanxia.ntpc.gov.tw (in Chinese)

Sanxia District
- Traditional Chinese: 三峽區
Transcriptions
Standard Mandarin
- Hanyu Pinyin: Sānxiá Qū
- Tongyong Pinyin: Sansiá Cyu
Southern Min
- Hokkien POJ: Sam-kiap-khu

Sanxia District (traditional Chinese: 三峽區; simplified Chinese: 三峡区; Hanyu Pinyin: Sānxiá Qū; Tongyong Pinyin: Sansiá Cyu; Pe̍h-ōe-jī: Sam-kiap-khu) is a district in the southwestern part of New Taipei, Taiwan. It is the second largest district in New Taipei City by area after Wulai District.

== Name ==
The old name of Sanxia, Sa-kak-eng (Chinese: 三角湧; pinyin: Sānjiǎoyǒng; Pe̍h-ōe-jī: Saⁿ-kak-éng; lit. 'triangular surge') dates back to the 1780s and refers to the confluence of the Dahan River, Sanxia River, and Hengxi River. In 1920, Taiwan's Japanese government administratively designated the town as Sankyō (Japanese: 三峽; lit. Three Gorges), Kaizan District, Taihoku Prefecture.

== History ==
The first Han people settled in what would become Sanxia during the 1700s, and originally rented land from the Plains Indigenous before forcing their displacement. After several groups of settlers from Southern China fought amongst themselves, Anxi County natives became dominant and began cultivating Strobilanthes cusia in the area. After Monga merchant Weng Tian introduced Indigofera tinctoria to Sa-kak-eng, the production of indigo increased, with the first recorded instance of large-scale production dating to 1822. Lin Tzu-tzeng of Anxi moved to Sa-kak-eng in 1830, and established the town's first dyeing workshop.

After the first coffee plants on Taiwan were imported by the British to Tainan in 1884, the first significant small-scale cultivation took place in Sa-kak-eng.

On December 25, 2010, Sanxia Township was renamed Sanxia District as Taipei County became a special municipality, New Taipei City.

== Geography ==
It has an area of 191.45 km^{2} and a population of 115,443 (February 2023).

== Government institutions ==
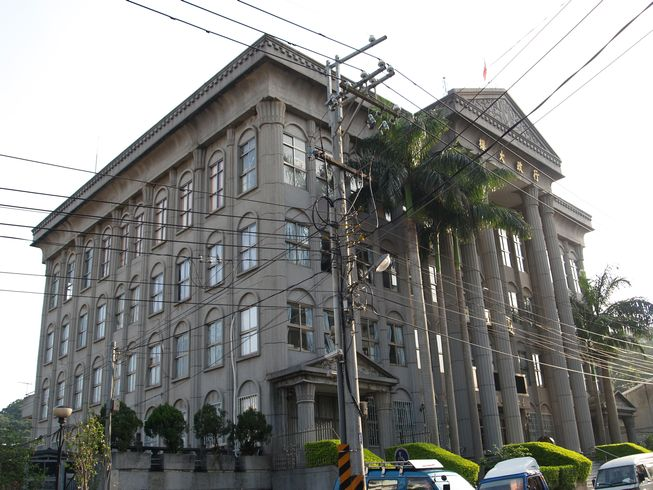
Sanxia District office

- National Academy for Educational Research

== Education ==
University

- National Taipei University Sanxia Main Campus (國立臺北大學三峽校區本部)

Senior High schools

- Mingde High school (市立明德高中)
- BeiDa High School (市立北大高中)
- Tsz-Shiou Senior High school (辭修高中)

Junior High schools

- Sanxia Junior High school (市立三峽國中)
- Anxi Junior High school (市立安溪國中)

Others

- National Academy for Educational Research Preparatory office-Planning Objectives

== Tourist attractions ==
- Zushi Temple - The most important religious site in Sanxia. Originally built in 1769 by Fukienese immigrants to Taiwan, it has been rebuilt three times, of which the last effort (beginning 1947) is the masterpiece of Taiwanese artist Li Mei-shu. It is considered by many to be the most intricately sculpted temple in Taiwan.
- Sanxia Old Street - A business street built during the Japanese rule, it is a very well preserved example of baroque-style architecture of the time. The street features stores selling art, ceramics, and local specialty foods (most notably Bull Horn Croissants).
- New Taipei City Hakka Museum - the largest Hakka cultural center in Taiwan exhibiting the culture, history, and influence of the Hakka people in Taiwan and abroad.
- Li Mei-shu Memorial Gallery
- Sanxia History Museum - preserves artistic and cultural artifacts from Sanxia's past.
- Manyueyuan National Forest Recreation Area
- National Taipei University Arts Boulevard
- Sanxia Agricultural Specialty Products Museum
- Tourism Factory of Cha-Shan-Fang Soap
- Pigs of God (神豬 (Pe̍h-ōe-jī: Sîn-ti)) Contest - The largest event held at Zushi Temple around Chinese New Year where farmers compete to raise the fattest pig. The fattest pig is then sacrificed at the temple but not to the main deity, Zushi-Ye as he was formerly a Buddhist monk. Controversial to animal rights activists, Zushi Temple is one of the few places in Taiwan that still practice this tradition.
- Sanxia Indigo Blue Dye Festival - A celebration of Sanxia's past as a major dyeing center in northern Taiwan.
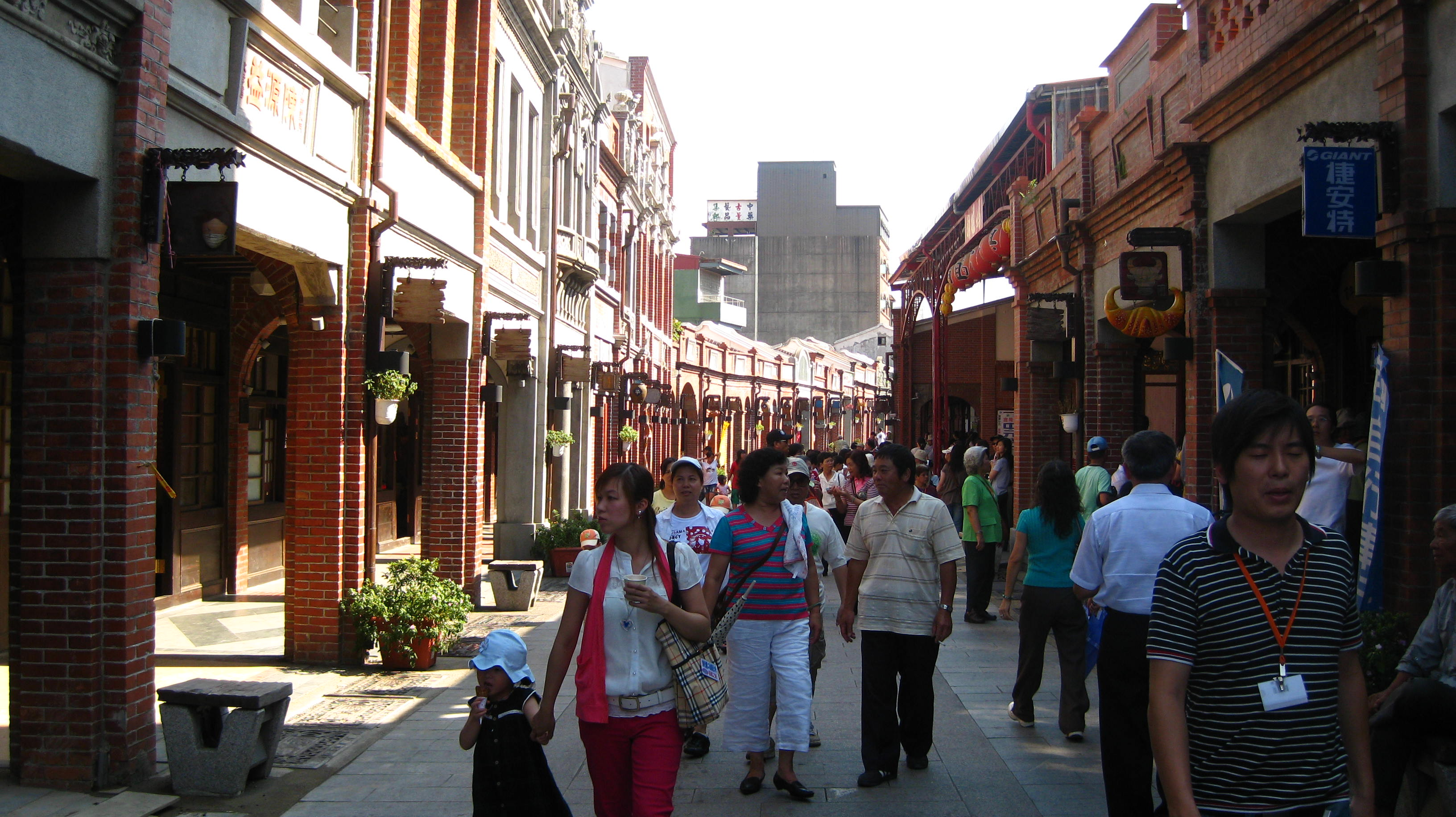
Walking along Sanxia Old Street

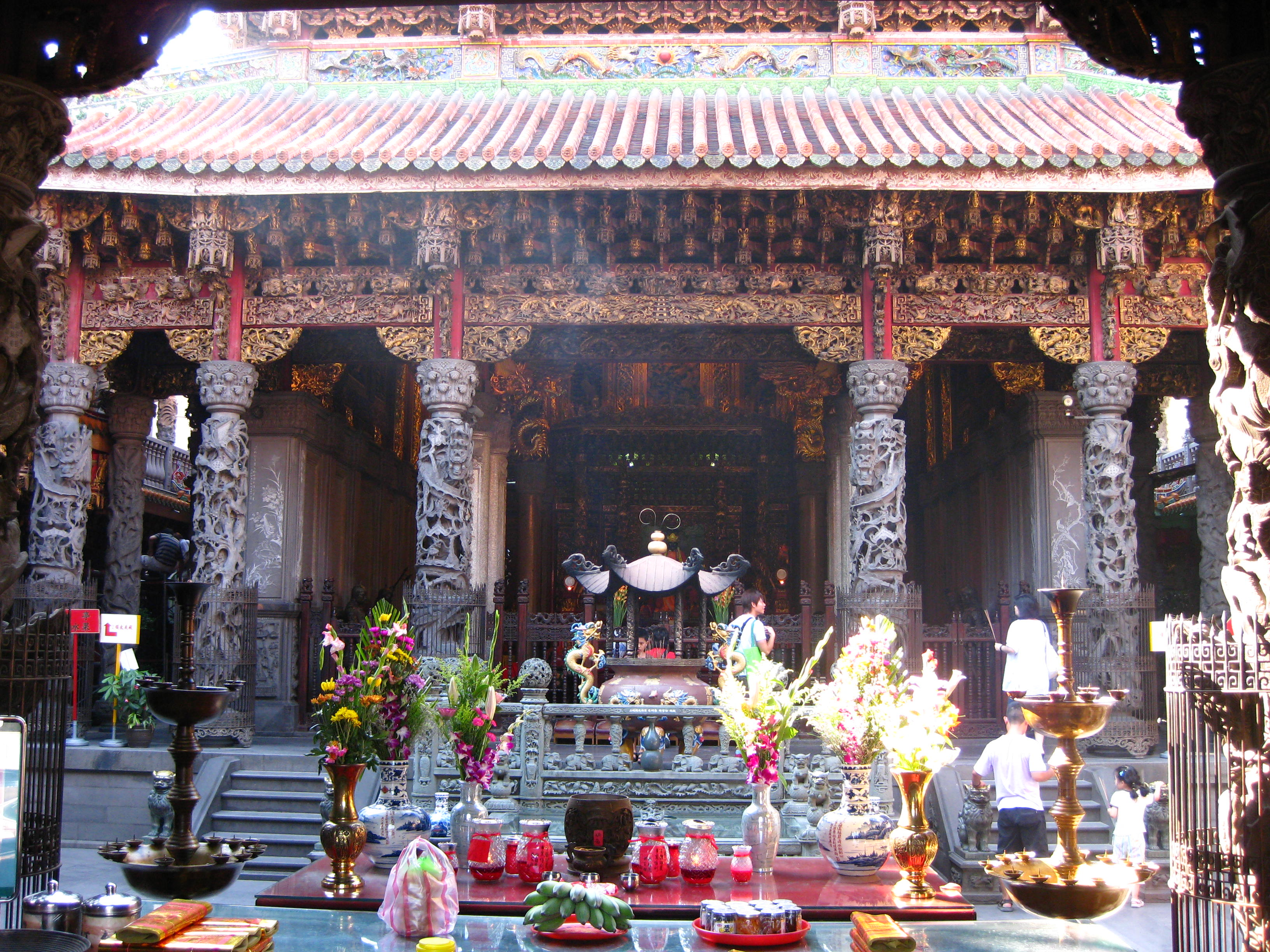
Zushi Temple

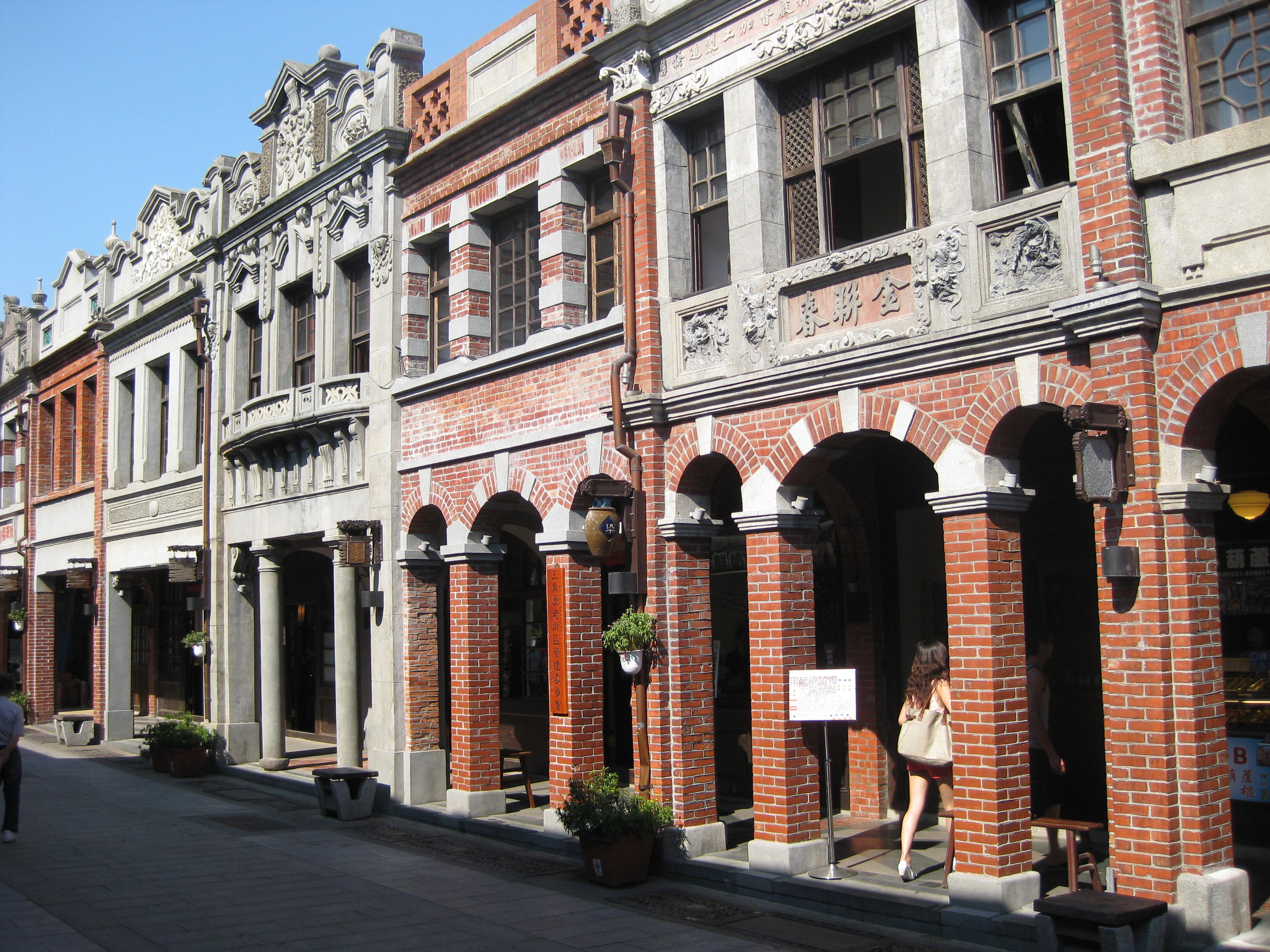
Baroque-style architecture along Sanxia Old Street

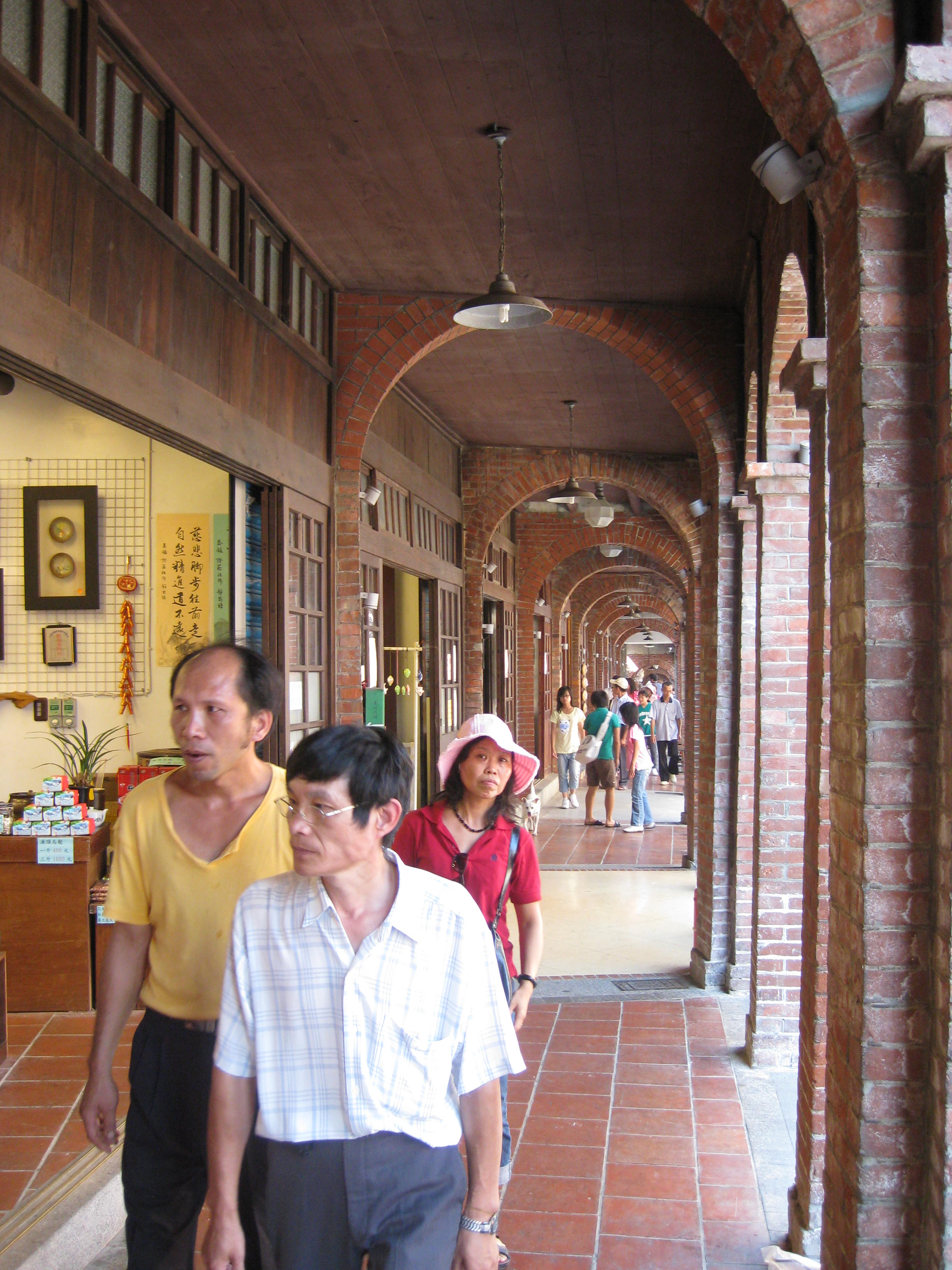
Shops along Sanxia Old Street

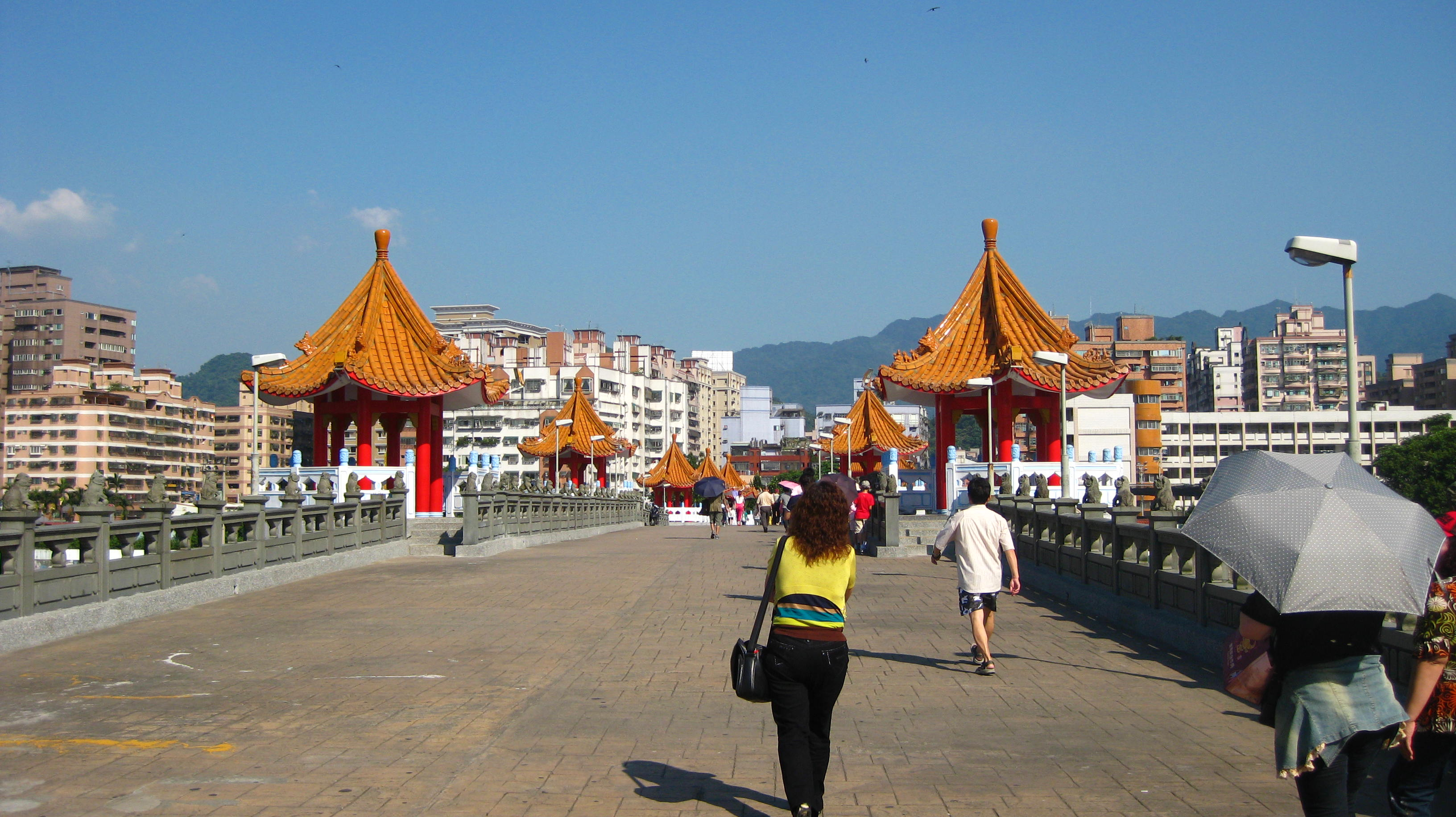
Changfu Bridge across the Sansia River

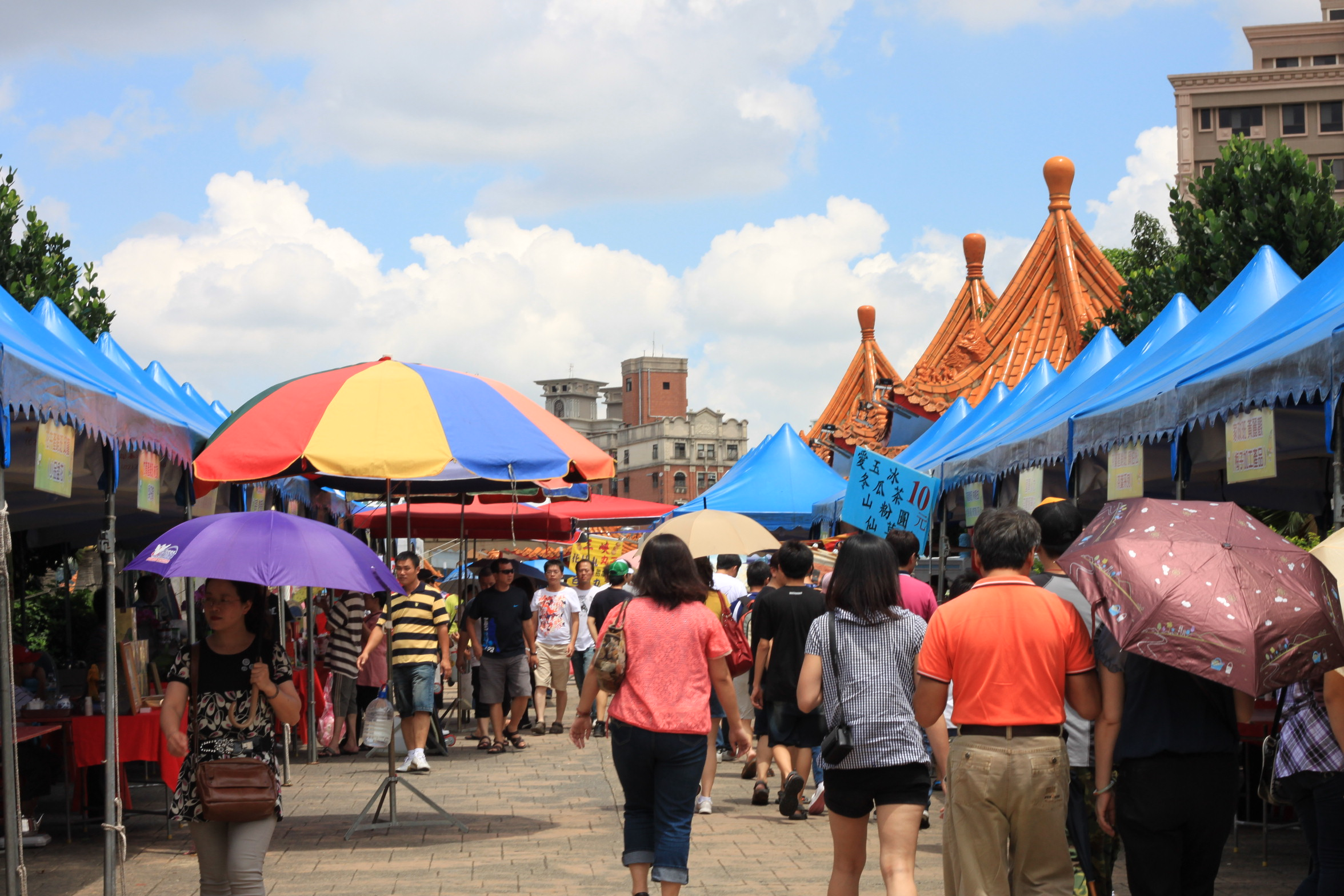
Street market on Changfu Bridge during Weekend

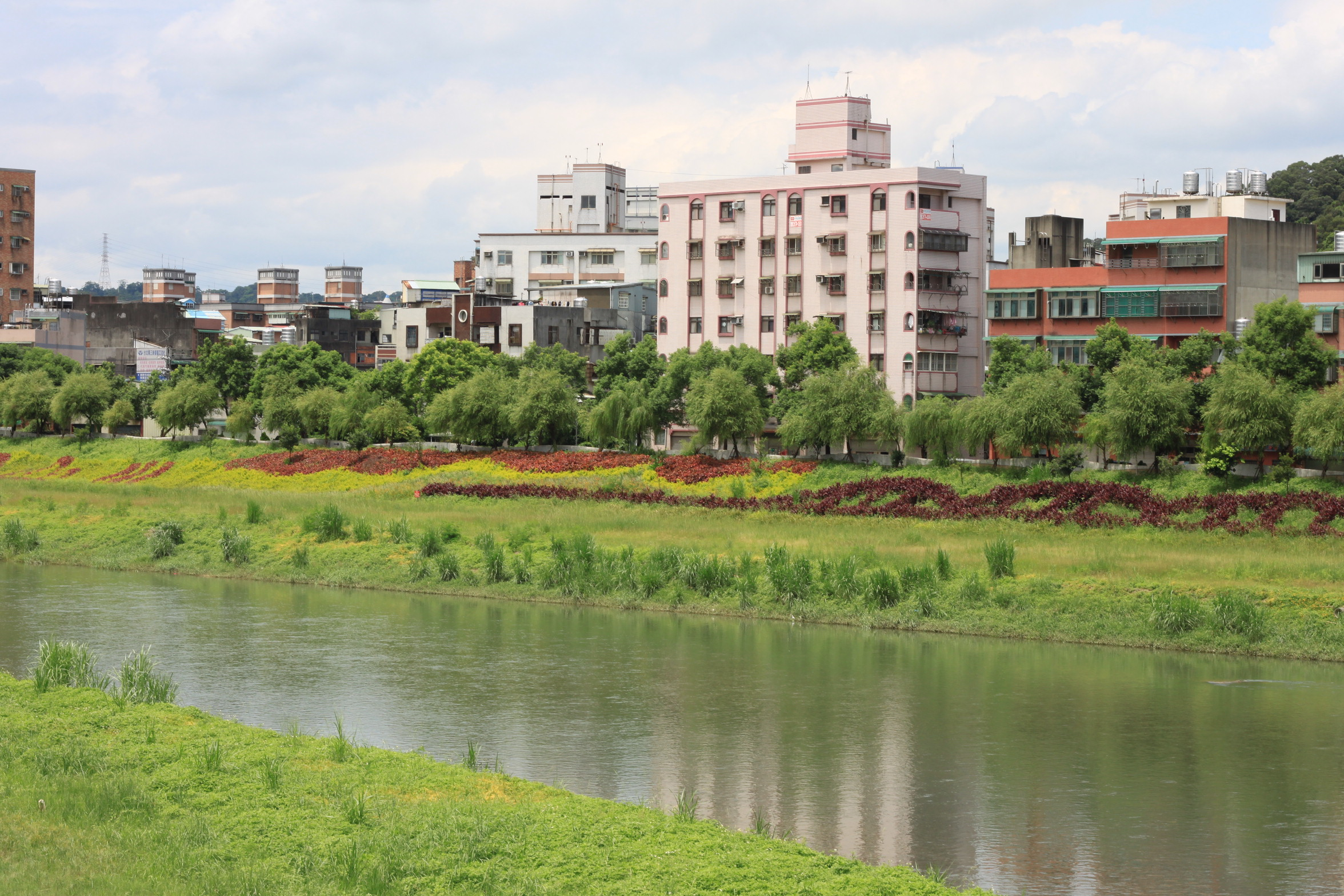
Sanxia River viewed from Changfu Bridge

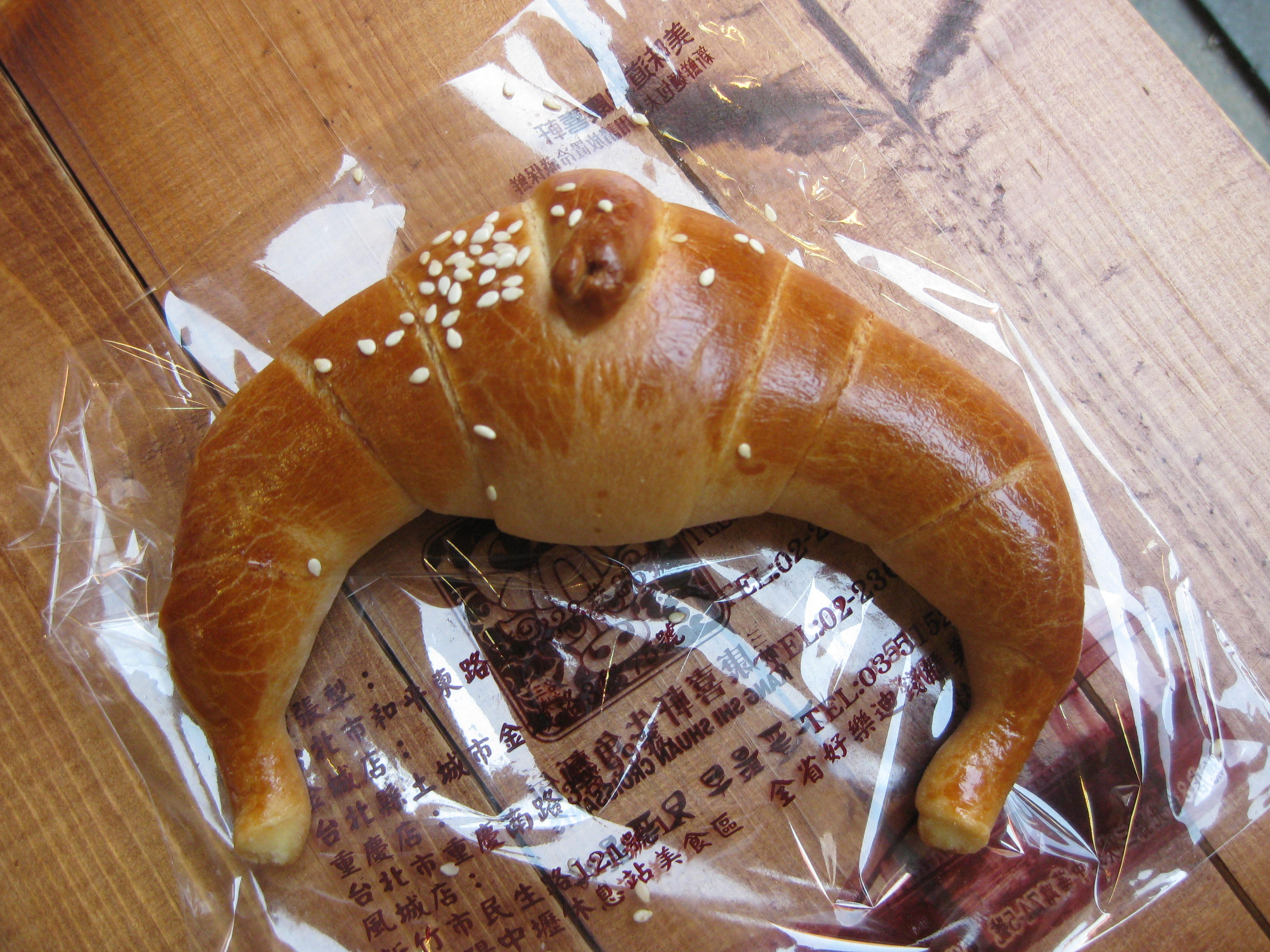
Bull Horn Croissants, a local specialty

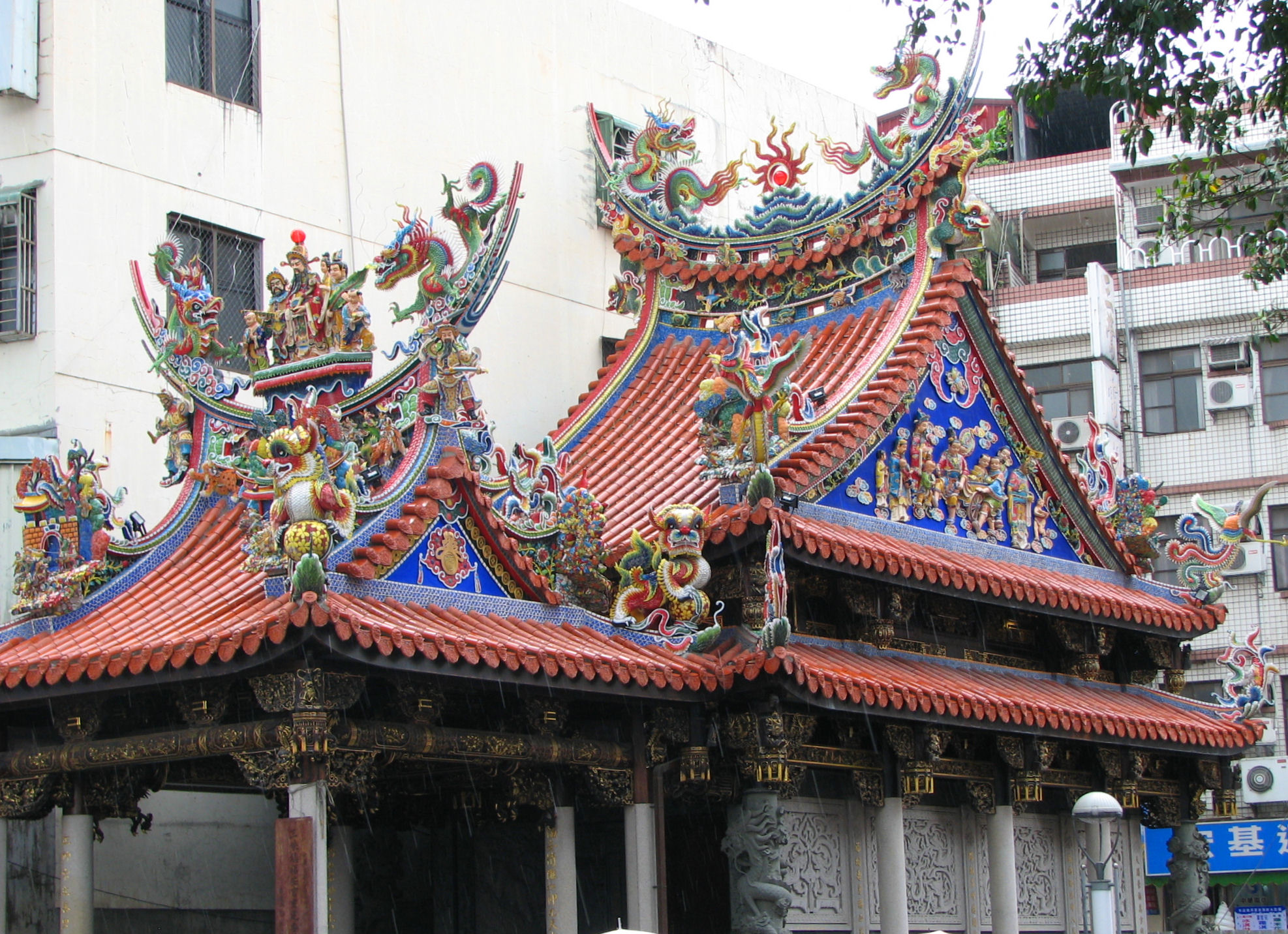
Sanxia Fu'an Temple

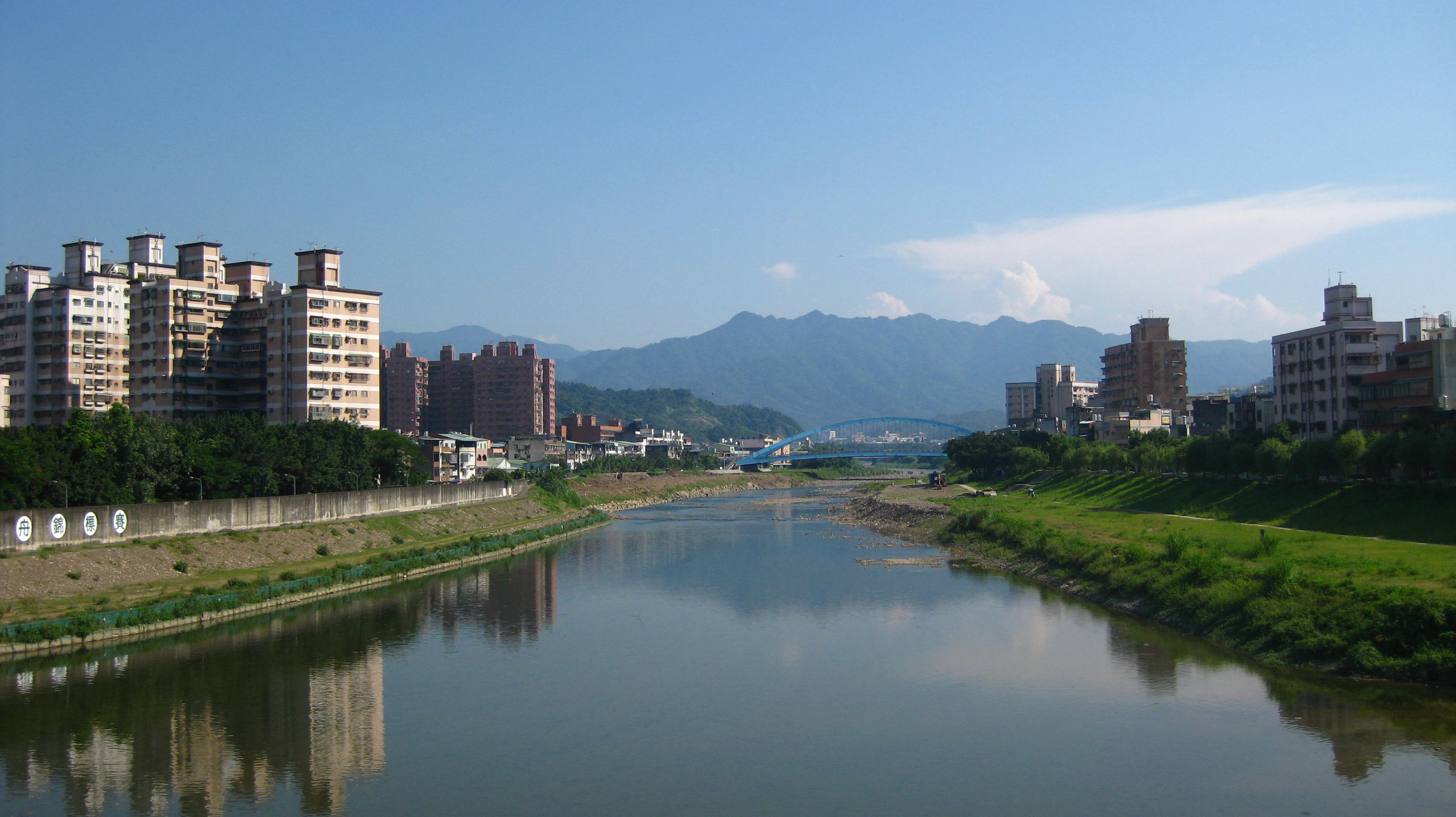
View from Changfu Bridge in Sanxia

== Transportation ==
- Car — Sanxia is served by Freeway No. 3. (San-ying Interchange)
- Bus — Sanxia is accessible by bus from Taipei (buses 702, 703, 705, 706,939), Taoyuan District, and Yingge (Blue 19).
- Train — Although Sanxia does not have a train station, it is accessible by bus from Yingge Train Station across the river.
- MRT — Accessible via the Tucheng Line of the Taipei Metro to Yongning. Bus 916 from exit 1 connects to Sanxia on Highway 3. In addition Bus 910 leaves from Fuzhong station in Banqiao. Both routes are multi-section tickets, paying on entry or exit. Sanying Line of the New Taipei Metro serves Changshoushan, Hengxi, Longpu, Sanxia and National Taipei University station here.

== Notable natives ==
- Li Mei-shu, painter, sculptor, and politician
