= New Taipei City Hakka Museum =

Museum in Sanxia, New Taipei, Taiwan

- 新北市客家文化園區
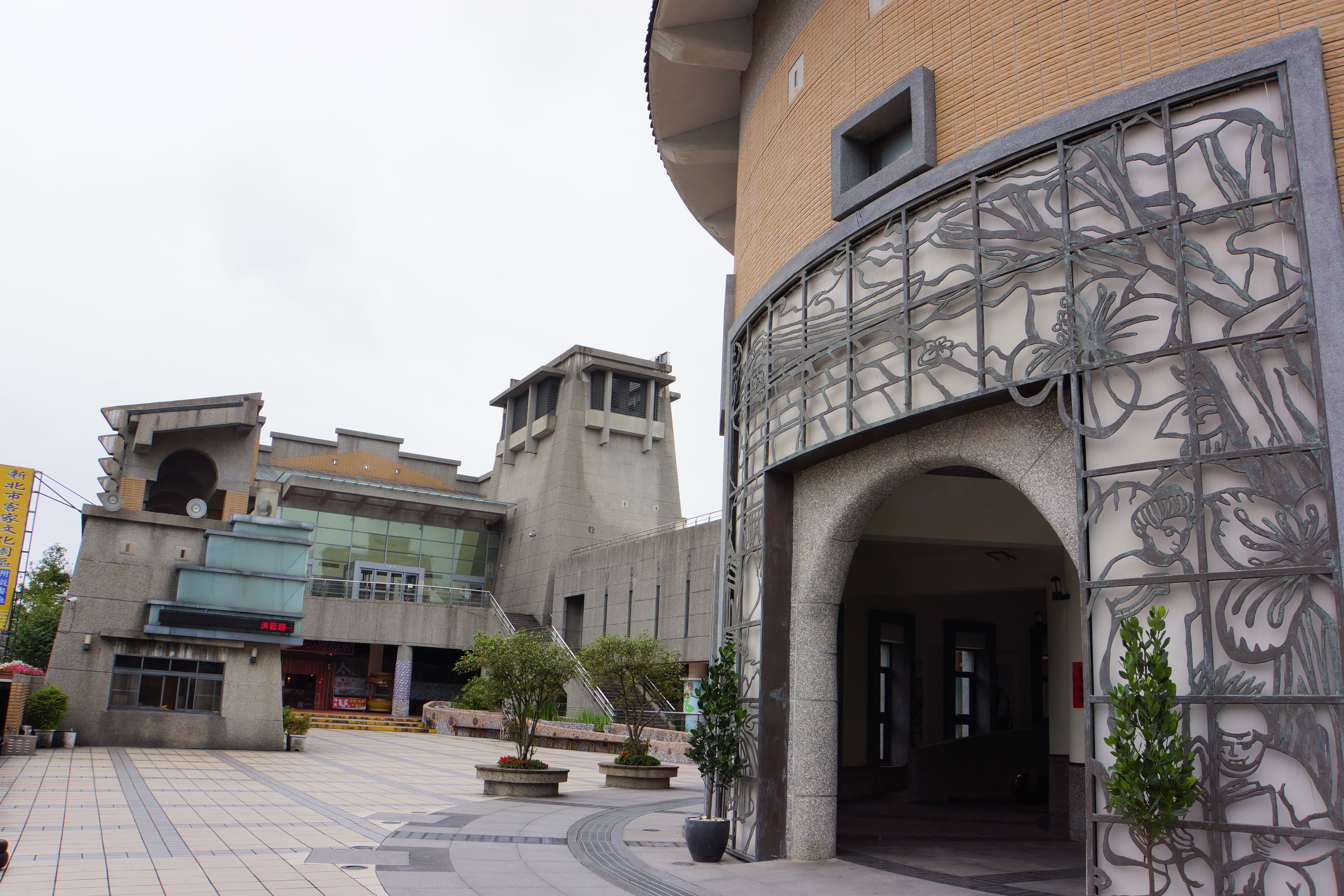
- Former name: Taipei County Hakka Museum
- Established: 4 August 2005
- Location: Sanxia, New Taipei, Taiwan
- Coordinates: 24°56′30″N 121°21′36″E
- Type: museum
- Website: Official website

The New Taipei City Hakka Museum (traditional Chinese: 新北市客家文化園區; simplified Chinese: 新北市客家文化园区; pinyin: Xīnběishì Kèjiā Wénhuà Yuánqū) is a museum about the Hakka people in Sanxia District, New Taipei, Taiwan.

== History ==
The museum was established on 4 August 2005 as Taipei County Hakka Museum. It was later renamed as New Taipei City Hakka Museum.

== Architecture ==
The museum total area spans over 4.03 hectares. The museum consists of the following sections: permanent exhibition hall, floor 2 long corridor, performance hall, special exhibition hall, briefing room, Hakka fashion exhibition, conference hall, restaurants and specialty shops, Hakka TV area, family reading room and boardwalk.

== Transportation ==
The museum is accessible within walking distance from National Taipei University Station of Sanying line.

== See also ==
- List of museums in Taiwan
