= Changfu Temple =

Taoist temple in New Taipei, Taiwan

- 三峽長福巖
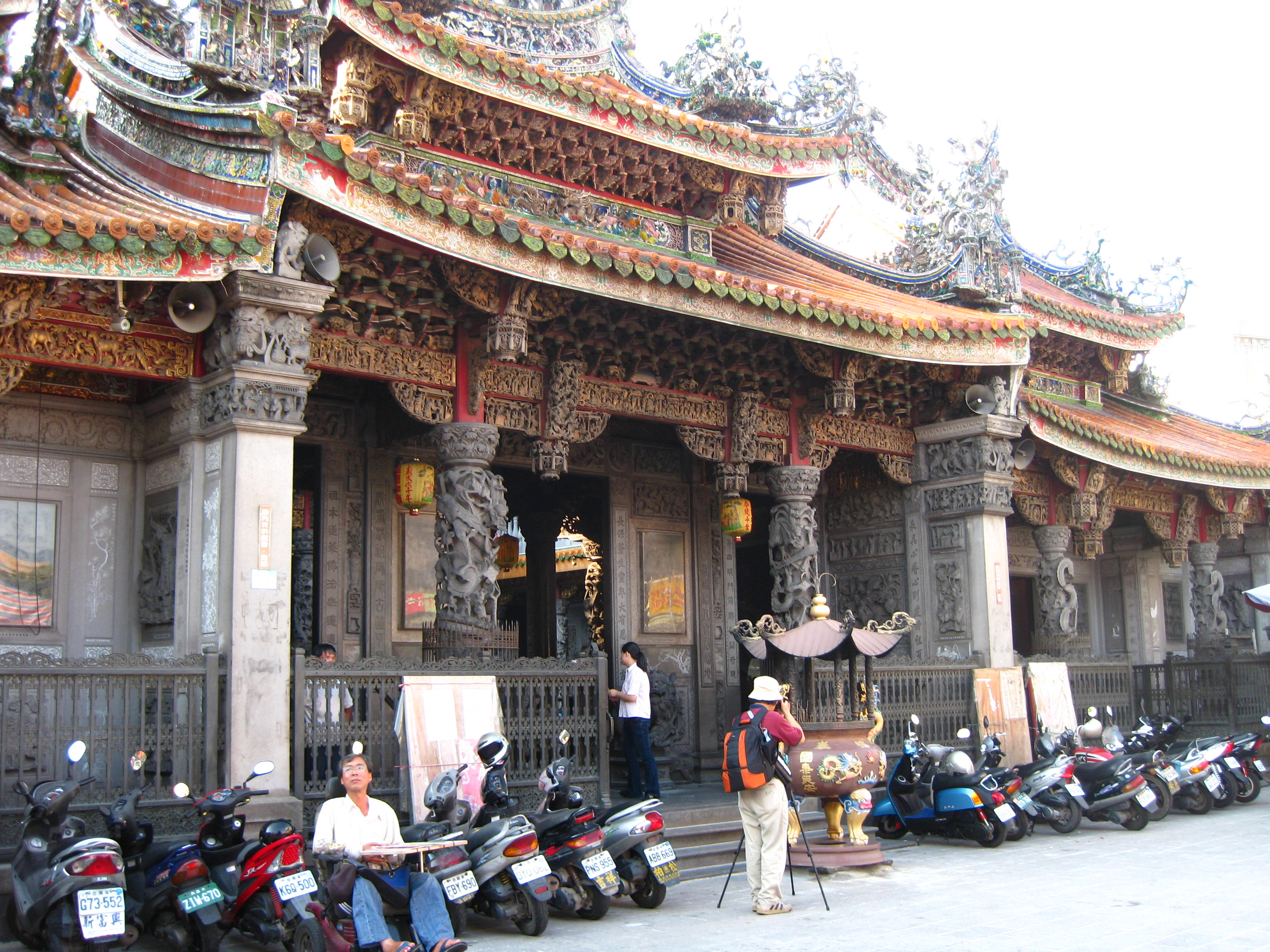

Religion
- Affiliation: Taoism

Location
- Location: Sanxia, New Taipei, Taiwan
- Interactive map of Changfu Temple
- Coordinates: 24°56′01.6″N 121°22′13.3″E

Architecture
- Type: Taoist temple
- Completed: 1767

Changfu Temple (Chinese: 三峽長福巖; pinyin: Sānxiá Chángfú Yán; Pe̍h-ōe-jī: Sam-kiap Tióng-hok-giâm) is a Taoist temple near Sanxia Old Street in Sanxia District, New Taipei, Taiwan. Master Qingshui, known locally as Zushi-Gong (Chinese: 袓師公; Pe̍h-ōe-jī: Chó͘-su-kong), is the principal deity worshiped at Changfu Temple.

== History ==
Changfu Temple was first built during the Qing dynasty in 1767 by Hokkien immigrants from Anxi County, Quanzhou Municipality, Fujian Province, in China. It had been reconstructed three times, with the most recent reconstruction, started in 1947, was led by Li Mei-shu and was regarded to be his masterpiece.

== Festivals ==
Every sixth day of the first month of the Chinese lunar calendar on Zushi-Gong's birthday, Changfu Temple holds a sacred pig (神豬; Pe̍h-ōe-jī: Sîn-ti) contest. Farmers would compete by raising the largest pig, which during the competition day, the pig is decorated with ornaments. The largest pig will then be sacrificed to the mountain deities, then the meat will be distributed among the devotees. In the past few years, this tradition has been met with objection by animal rights activists. While the majority of temples that practice this rite have started using symbolic pigs, Changfu Temple in Sanxia still continues the tradition of using an actual pig.

== Architecture ==
Unique among temples, all of the walls and columns of Changfu Temple are sculpted from stone. The details are also carved with a wide variety of styles from ancient to modern, or even western-influenced, due to the western art education of Li Mei-shu.

== Transportation ==
The temple is accessible south of Yingge Station of Taiwan Railway.

== See also ==
- Master Qingshui
- Bangka Qingshui Temple (艋舺清水巖), Taipei, Taiwan
- Zhouzi Qingshui Temple (清水宮), Kaohsiung, Taiwan
- Chin Swee Caves Temple (清水岩庙), Genting Highlands, Malaysia
- Snake Temple Penang, Malaysia
- Fushan Temple (福山寺), Yangon, Myanmar
- List of temples in Taiwan
- Religion in Taiwan

== Gallery ==
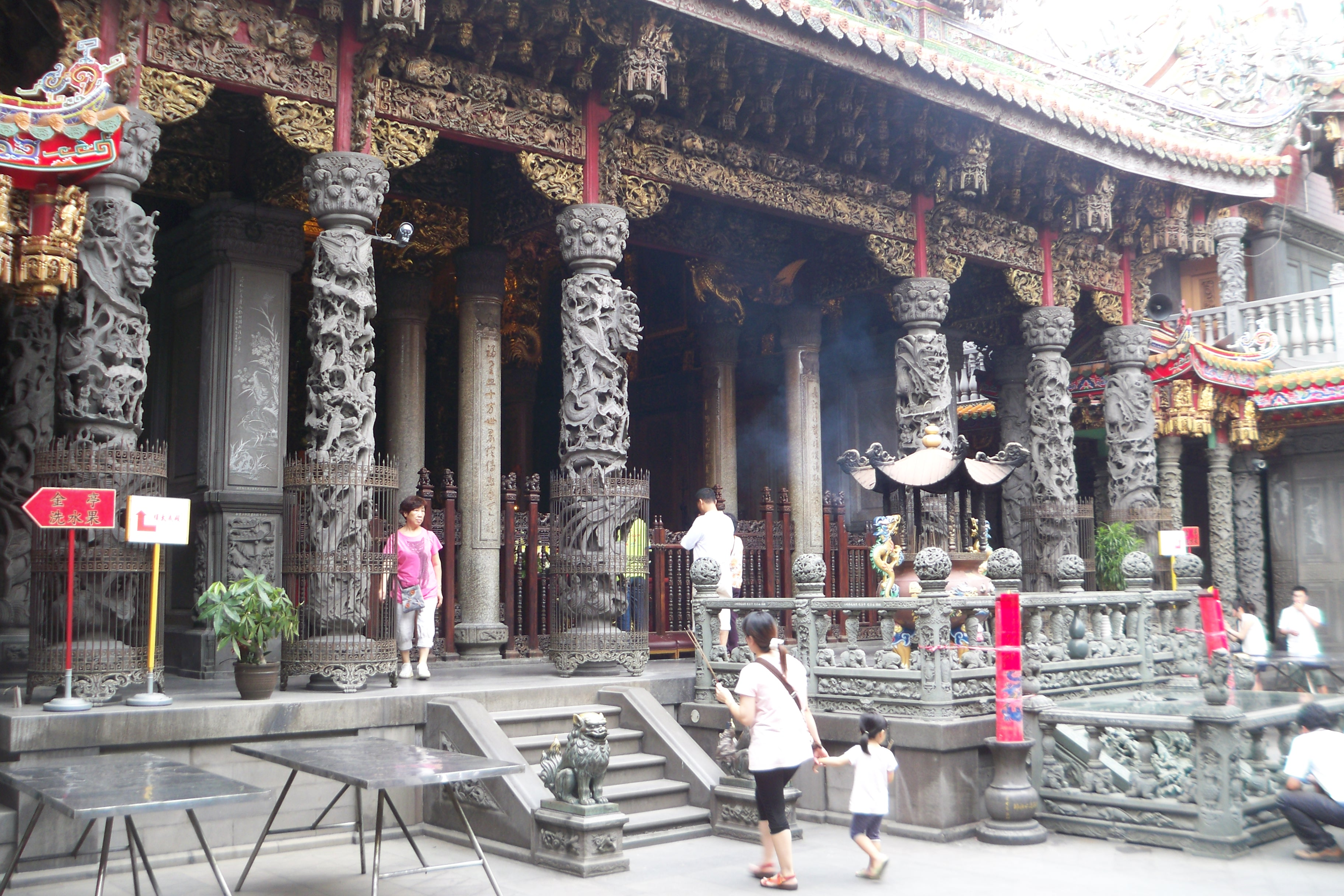
Inner court of Changufu Temple

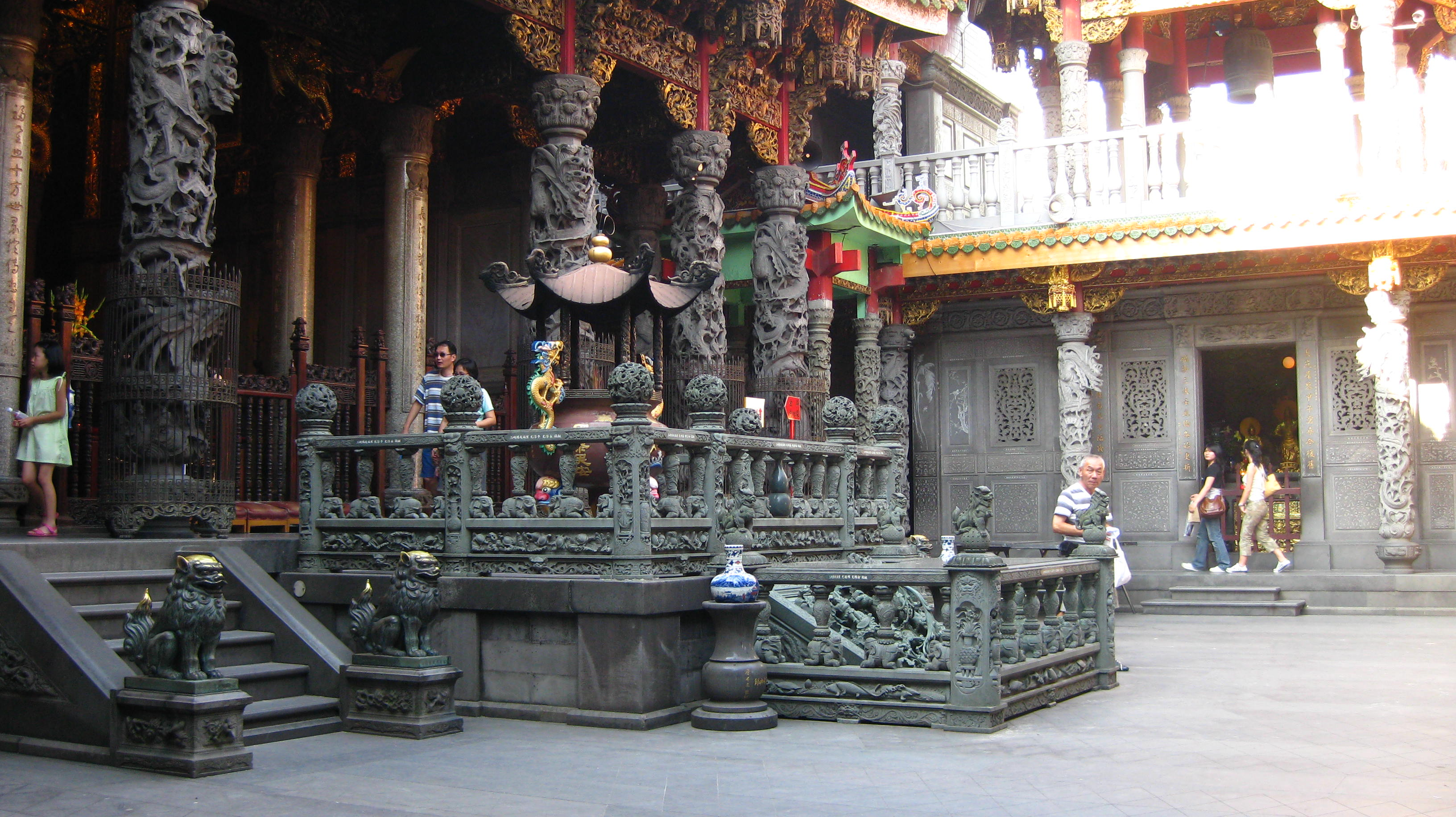
Inner court of Changufu Temple

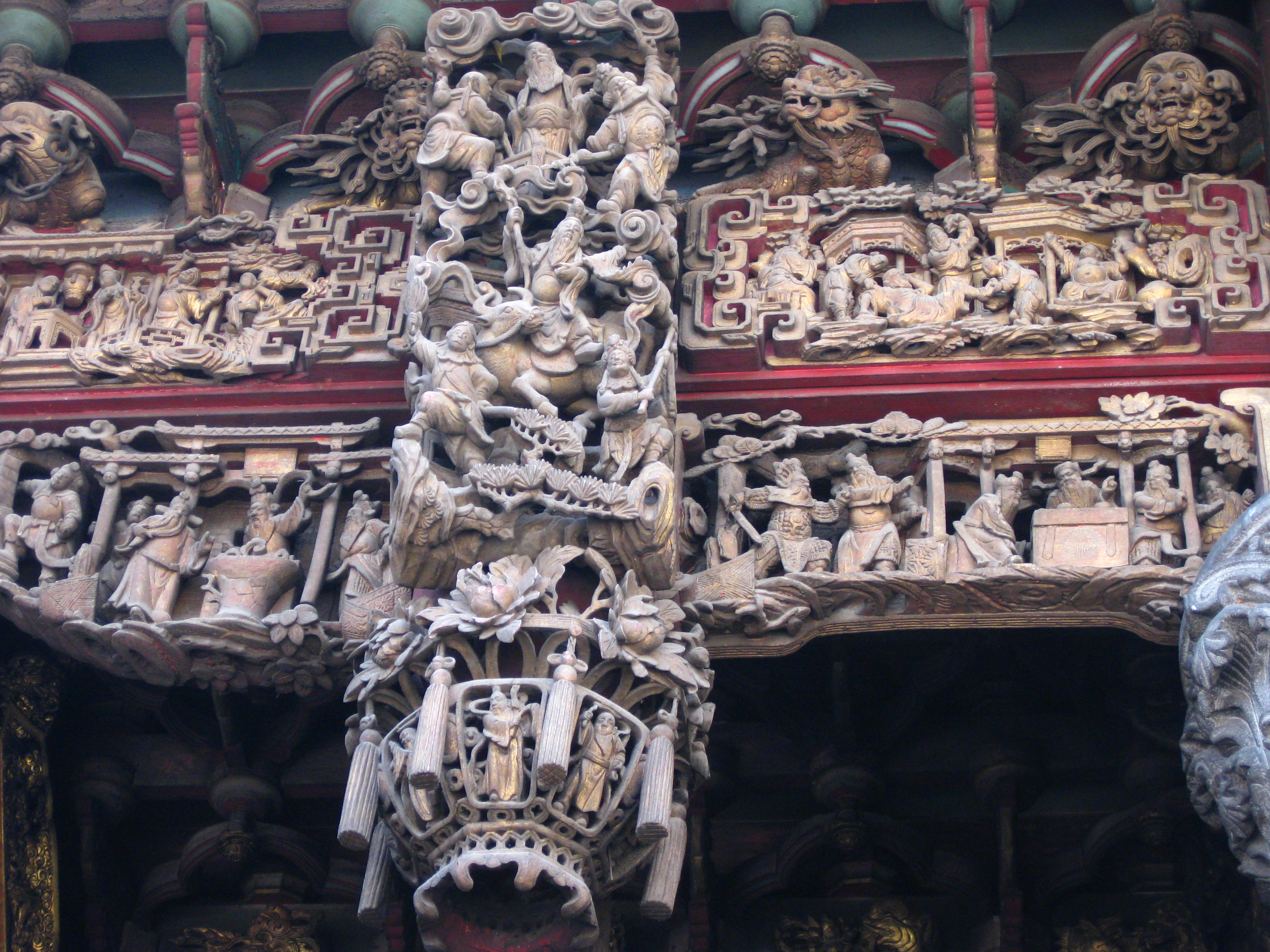
Beam details on Changufu Temple

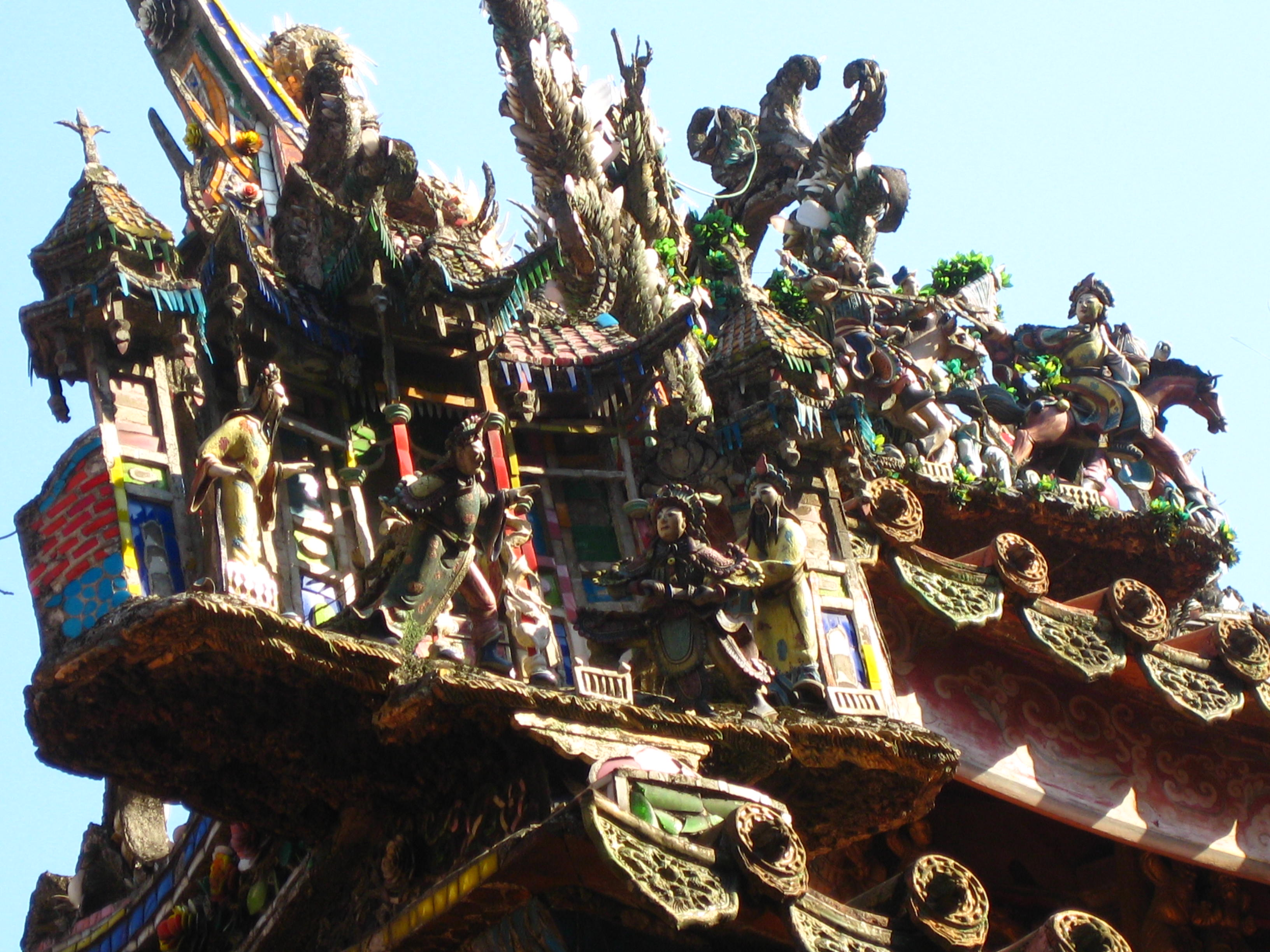
Roof details above entrance

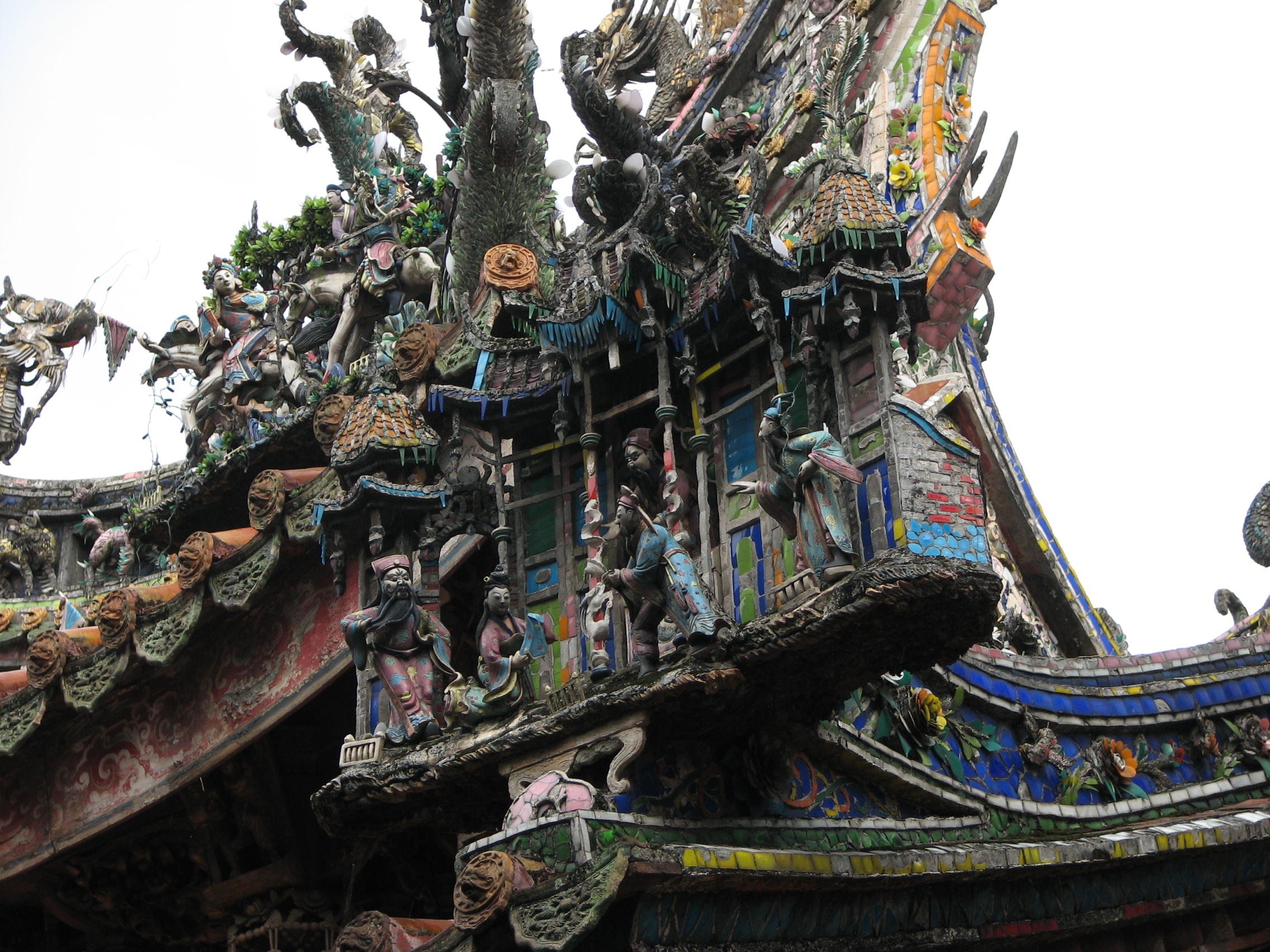
Roof ornamentation

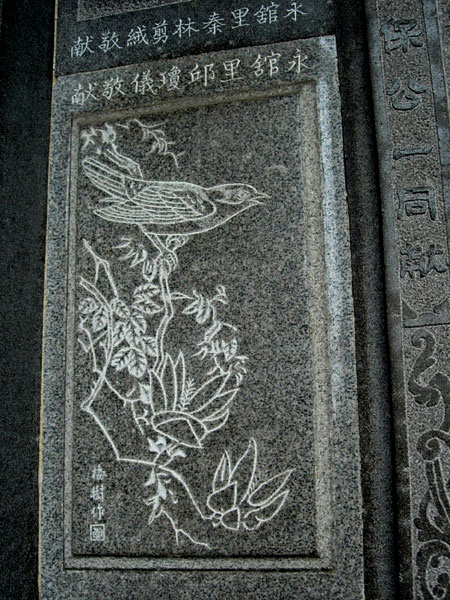
One of the works by Li Meishu

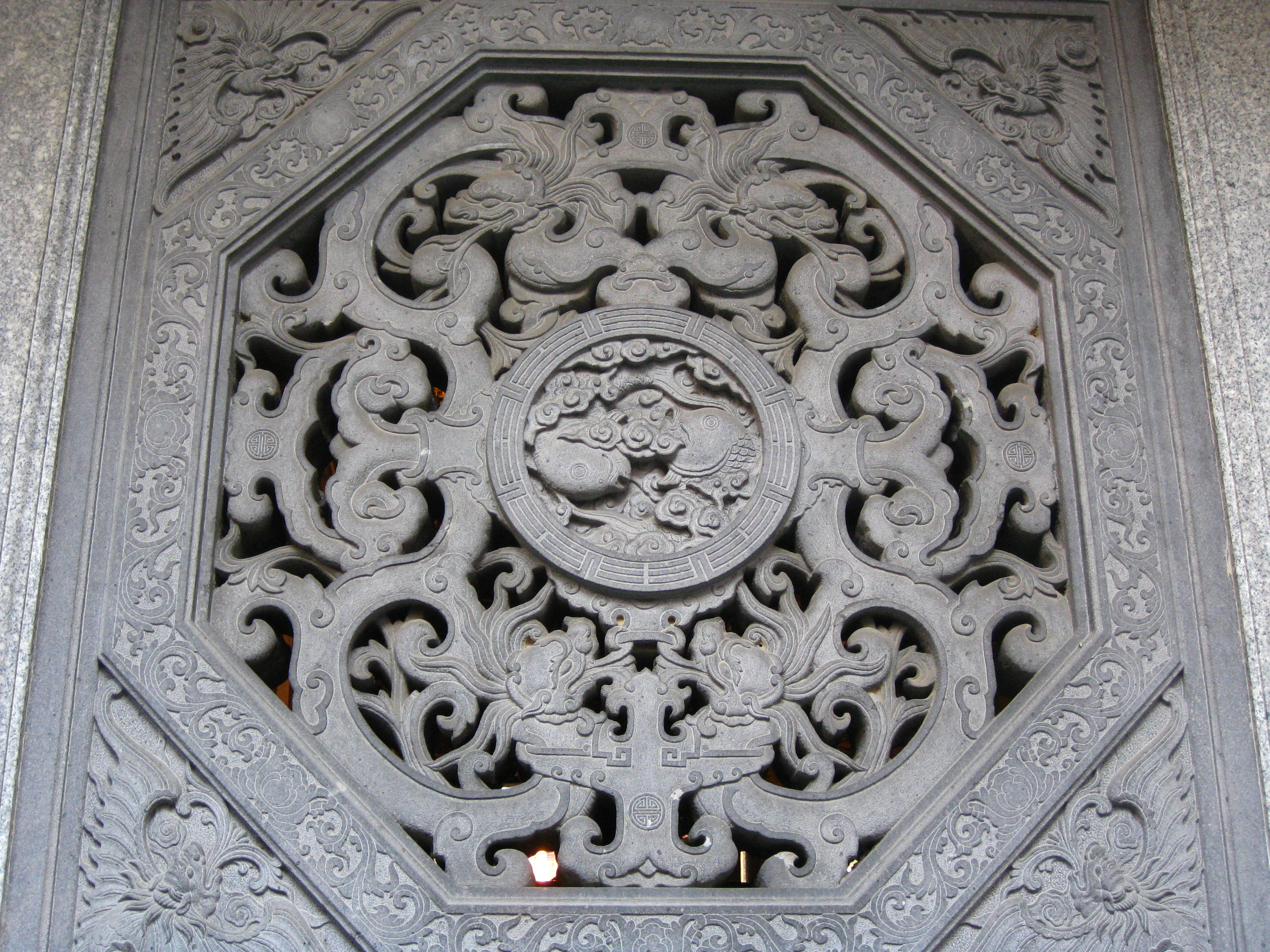
Window details. The fish design forms a Yin Yang symbol, surrounded by the bagua symbol.

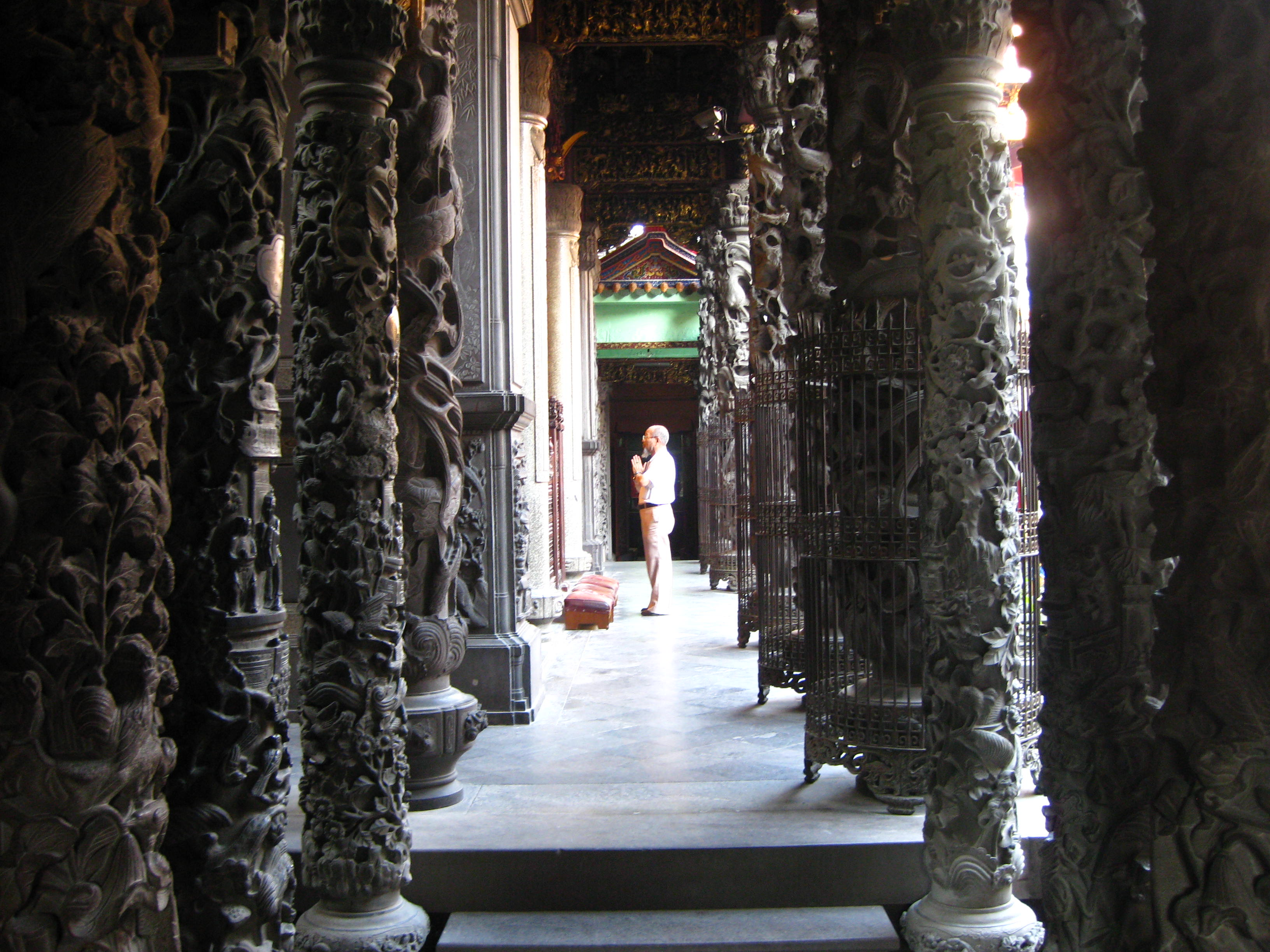
Every column is carved with a different design.

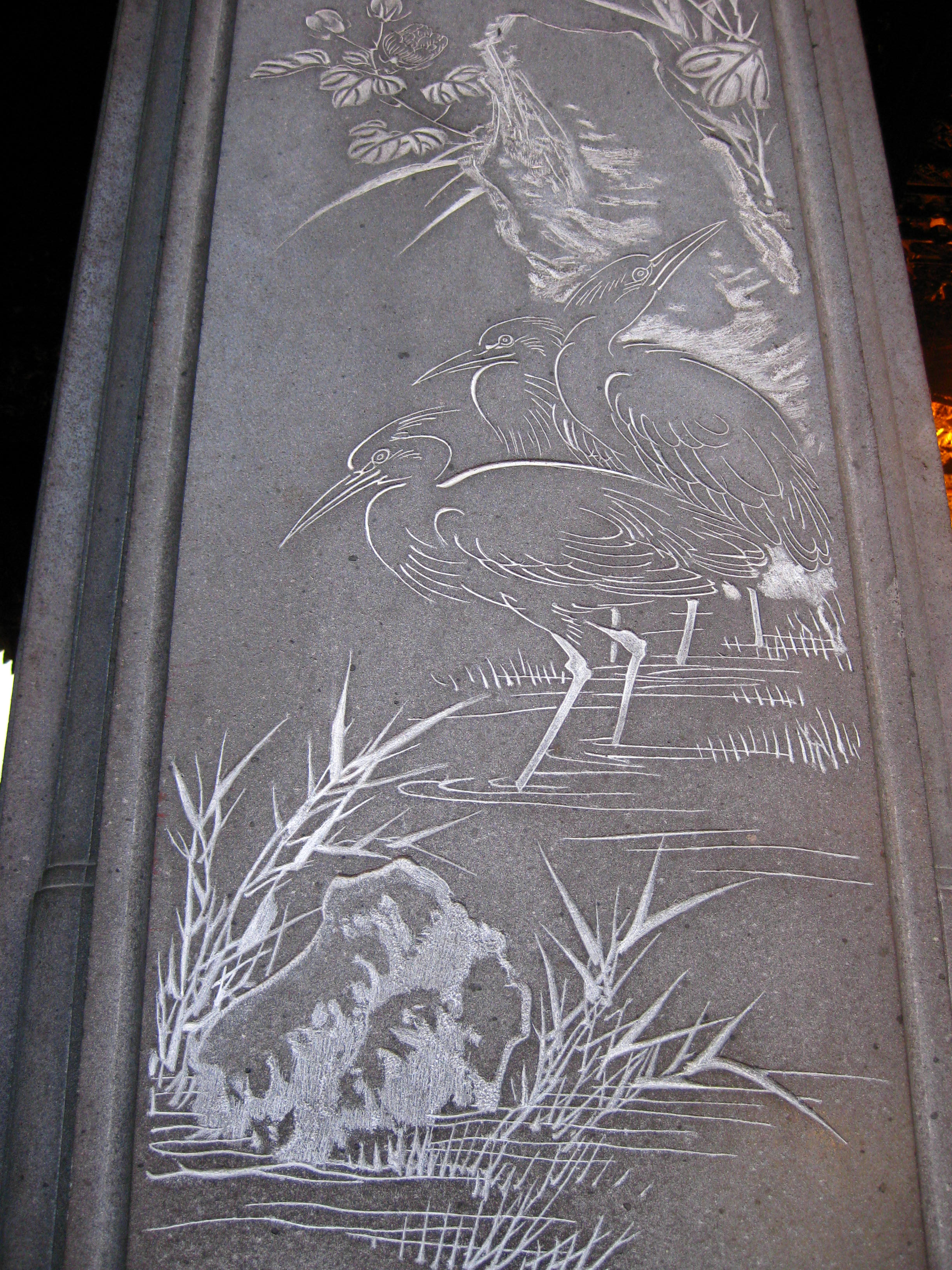
Painting-like carvings on the walls

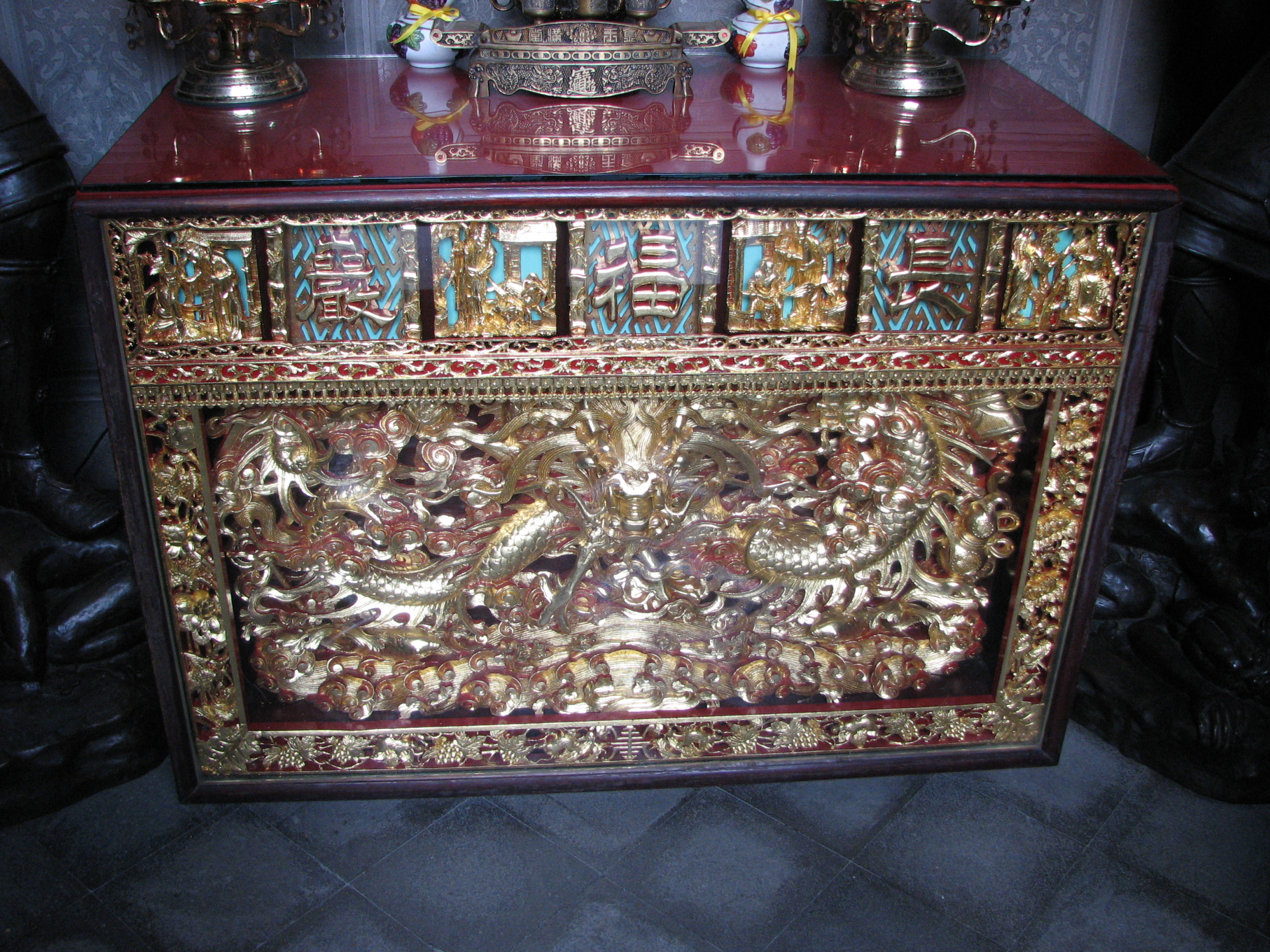
Altar in temple

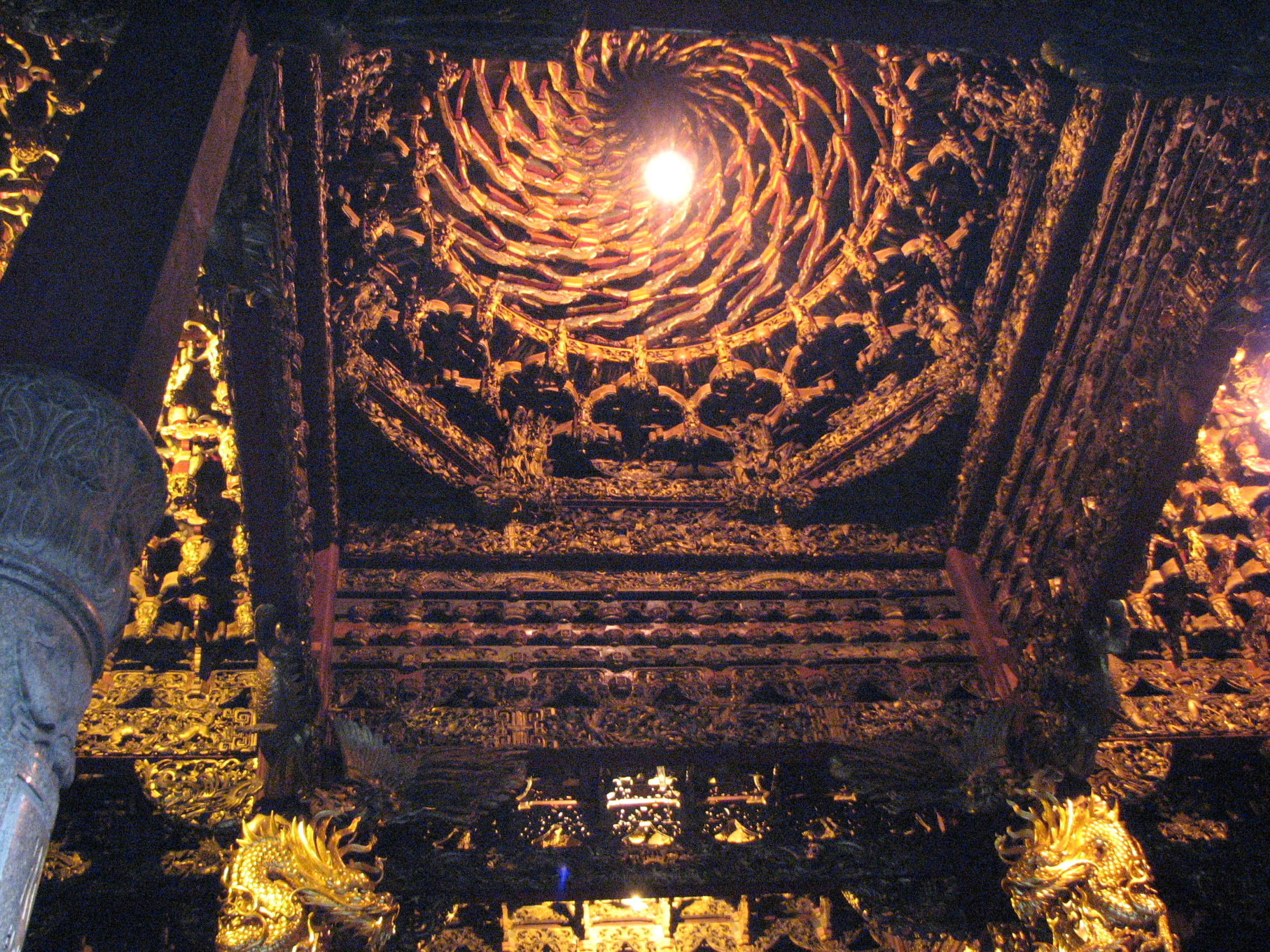
Ceiling in temple

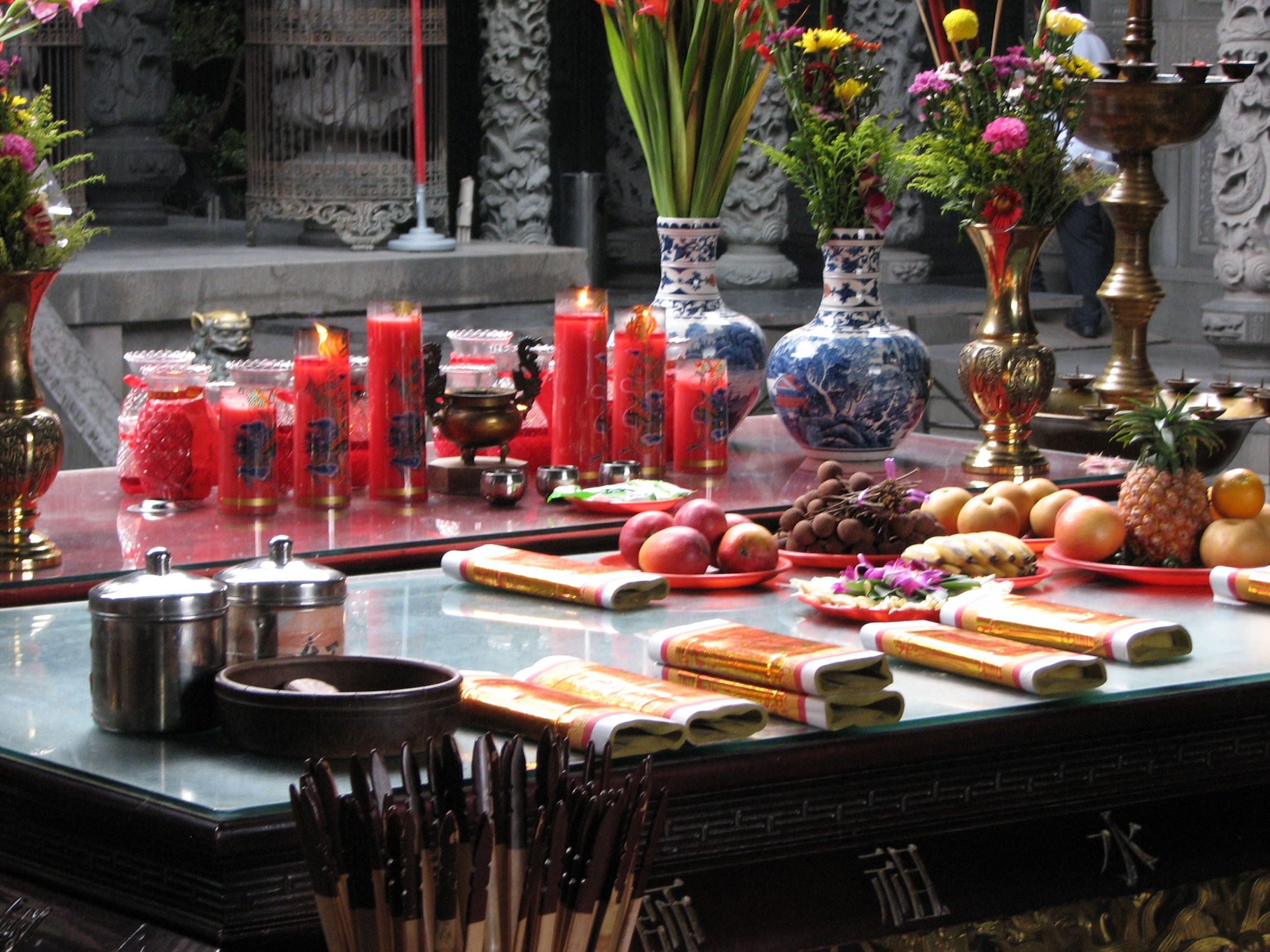
Prayer papers for temple worshippers
