= Li Mei-shu Memorial Gallery =

Gallery in Sanxia, New Taipei, Taiwan

- 李梅樹紀念館
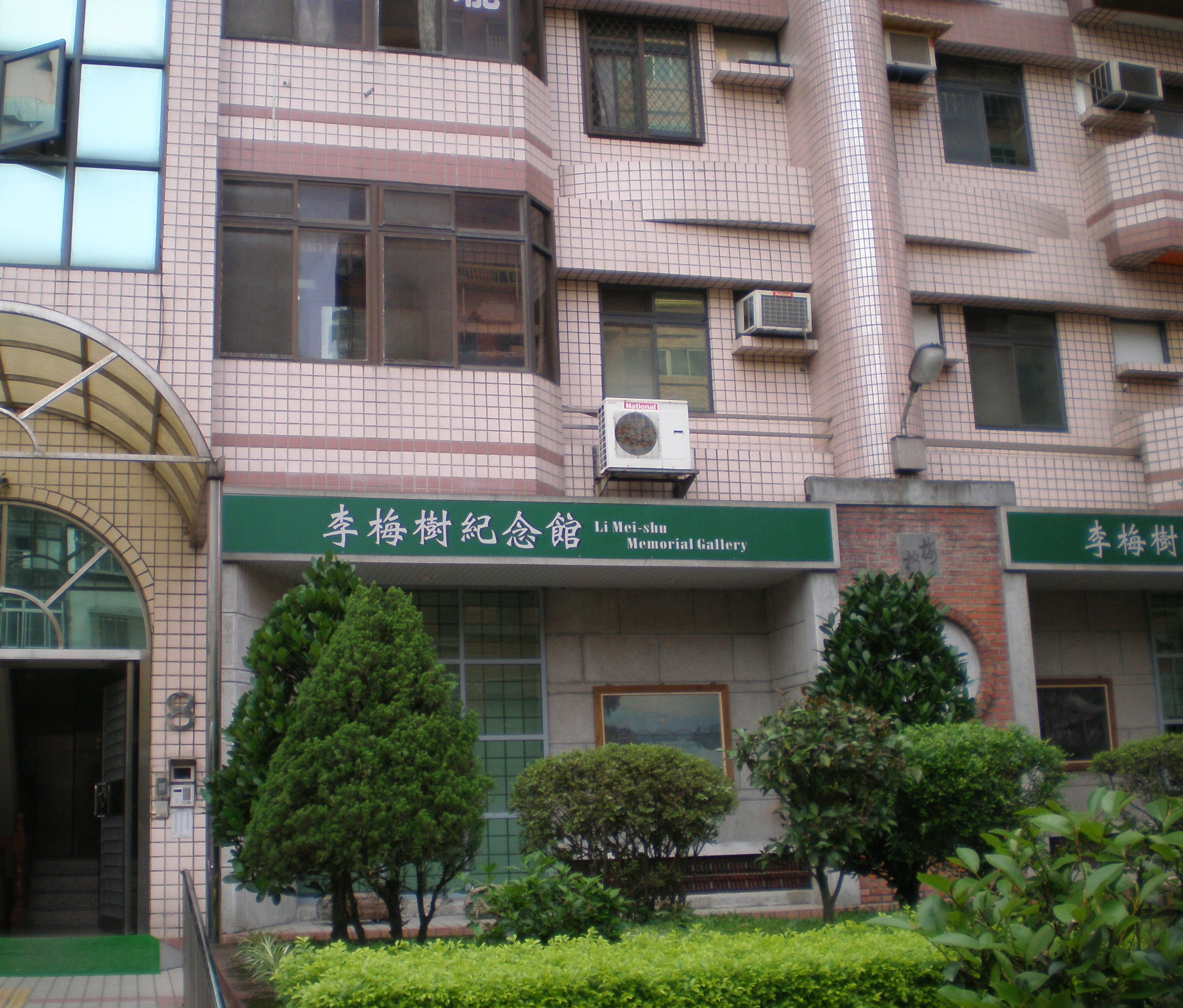
- Interactive map of the Li Mei-shu Memorial Gallery area

General information
- Type: gallery
- Location: Sanxia, New Taipei, Taiwan
- Coordinates: 24°55′50.0″N 121°22′22.3″E
- Opened: 9 April 1995

Website
- Official website

The Li Mei-shu Memorial Gallery (traditional Chinese: 李梅樹紀念館; simplified Chinese: 李梅树纪念馆; pinyin: Lǐméishù Jìniànguǎn) is a memorial gallery located in Sanxia District, New Taipei, Taiwan. The gallery is dedicated to Taiwanese painter, sculptor and politician Li Mei-shu.

== History ==
The gallery was opened on 9 April 1995 by descendants of Li.

In May 2024, the gallery was forced to cover up a large poster of Li's 1936 painting, Reclining Nude, from a parking lot, where it had been displayed to promote an upcoming exhibition, following complaints by parents from the neighboring Anxi Elementary School for its nudity and Mandarin captions containing a sexual connotations.

== Exhibitions ==
The gallery exhibits various artwork collections and documents of Li.

== See also ==
- List of tourist attractions in Taiwan
