= Li Mei-shu =

Taiwanese artist (1902–1983)

- 李梅樹
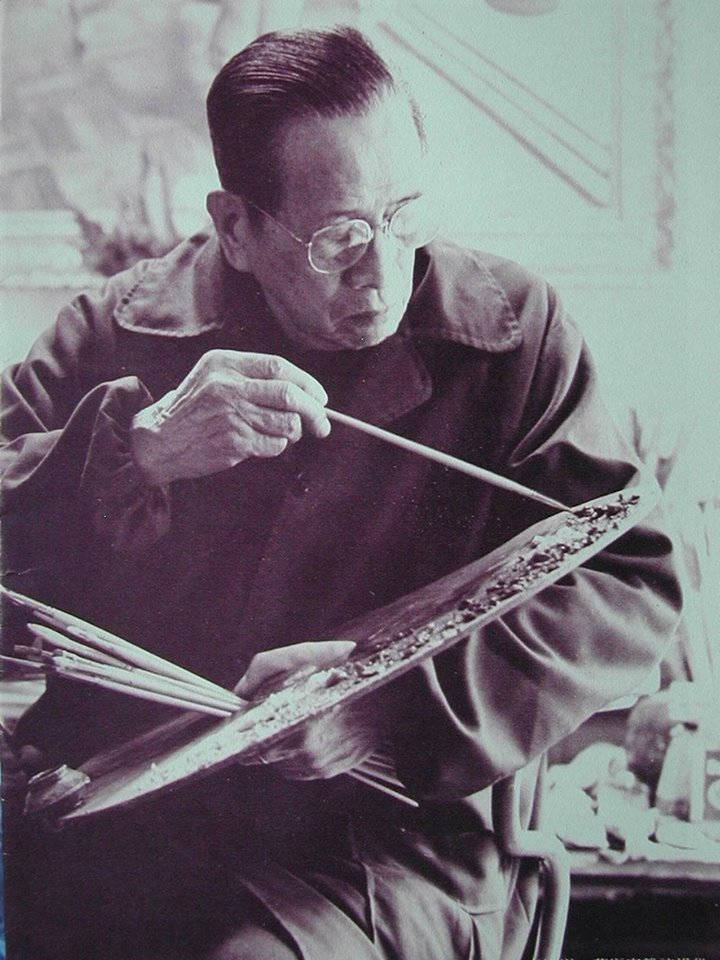
- Pronunciation: Lí Muî-sū
- Born: 13 March 1902; Sankakuyū, Tōshien Chō, Japanese Taiwan (modern-day Sanxia District, New Taipei, Taiwan)
- Died: 6 February 1983 (aged 80); Taipei, Taiwan
- Resting place: Sanxia District
- Education: Taiwan Governor-General's National Language School, Tokyo School of Fine Arts
- Alma mater: Tokyo School of Fine Arts
- Known for: Co-Founder of Tai-Yang Art Society 臺陽美術協會, Organizer of Re-construction committee of Qingshui Zushi (Divine Ancestor) Temple
- Notable work: Washing clothes by the clear stream 新溪浣衣, Spring Dawn at Sanxia
- Movement: Realism
- Awards: Still Life and Backstreets of Sanxia were selected for the 1st and 2nd Taiwan Art Exhibitions (Taiten) in 1927.; Girl at Rest included in the 9th Taiwan Art Exhibition as a special selection; recipient of the Taiwan Art Exhibition Award.
- Memorials: Li Mei-shu Memorial Gallery

Li Mei-shu
- Traditional Chinese: 李梅樹
Transcriptions
Standard Mandarin
- Hanyu Pinyin: Lǐ Méishù
Southern Min
- Hokkien POJ: Lí Muî-sū

Li Mei-shu (Chinese: 李梅樹; pinyin: Li Méishù; 13 March 1902 – 6 February 1983) was a Taiwanese painter, sculptor, and politician. He was best known for his paintings as well as his restoration attempt of the Changfu Temple.

== Education ==
Li was born to an upper-class family in Sankakuyū (Pe̍h-ōe-jī: Saⁿ-kak-éng), Japanese Taiwan (modern-day Sanxia District, New Taipei City) on 13 March 1902. He began to demonstrate a propensity for painting in his early years. In 1918, he was accepted into the Painting Division of the Taiwan Governor-General's National Language School. He taught himself painting after school through a copy of A Collection of Lectures, which he ordered from Japan through post. Upon graduating, he taught at Zuihō Public School (in modern-day Ruifang District). During this time, he participated in the Summer Art Seminar organized by Kinichiro Ishikawa. His works 'Still Life and Backstreets of Sanxia' were selected for the first and second Taiwan Art Exhibitions (Taiten), respectively.

He then obtained his family's consent to go to Japan to further his painting studies. In 1929, he was accepted by the Division of Western Painting at the Tokyo School of Fine Arts, where he studied with teachers such as Okada Saburousuke and Kobayashi Mango.

== Work and public life ==
After graduating in 1934, Li returned to Taiwan and co-founded the Tai-Yang Art Society along with artists such as Liao Chi-chun, Tan Teng-pho, and Yen Shui-long. In 1935, his work Girl at Rest was the special selection of the ninth Taiwan Art Exhibition. In 1939, his work Red Dress was selected for the third Ministry of Education Art Exhibition (Shin Bunten).

After World War II, Li served several terms as chairman of Sanxia street, township representative, and county councilor. From 1945, he served as director of the re-construction committee of Qingshui Zushi (Divine Ancestor) Temple in Sanxia. He invited his friends in the art community, such as Chen Jin, Lin Yushan, Guo Xuehu, to reconstruct the stone walls and sculptures of Changfu Temple (locally known as Zushi Temple) together; this reconstruction was considered to be Li's masterpiece.

In 1962, he devoted himself to the promotion of art education by teaching in the art departments of schools such as Chinese Culture University, National Taiwan University of Arts, and National Taiwan Normal University.

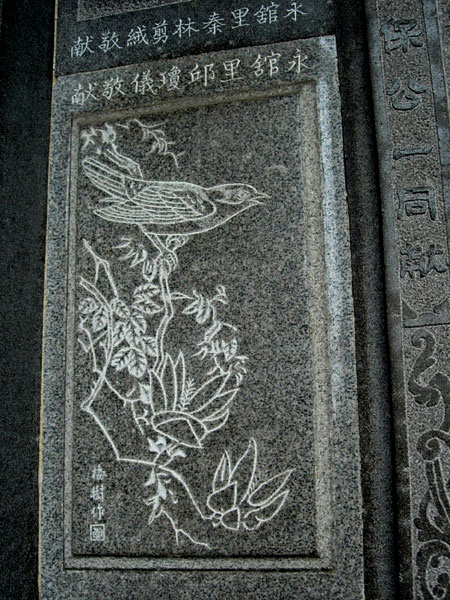
A sculptural work by Li Meishu on Zushi Temple in Sanxia

== Painting style ==
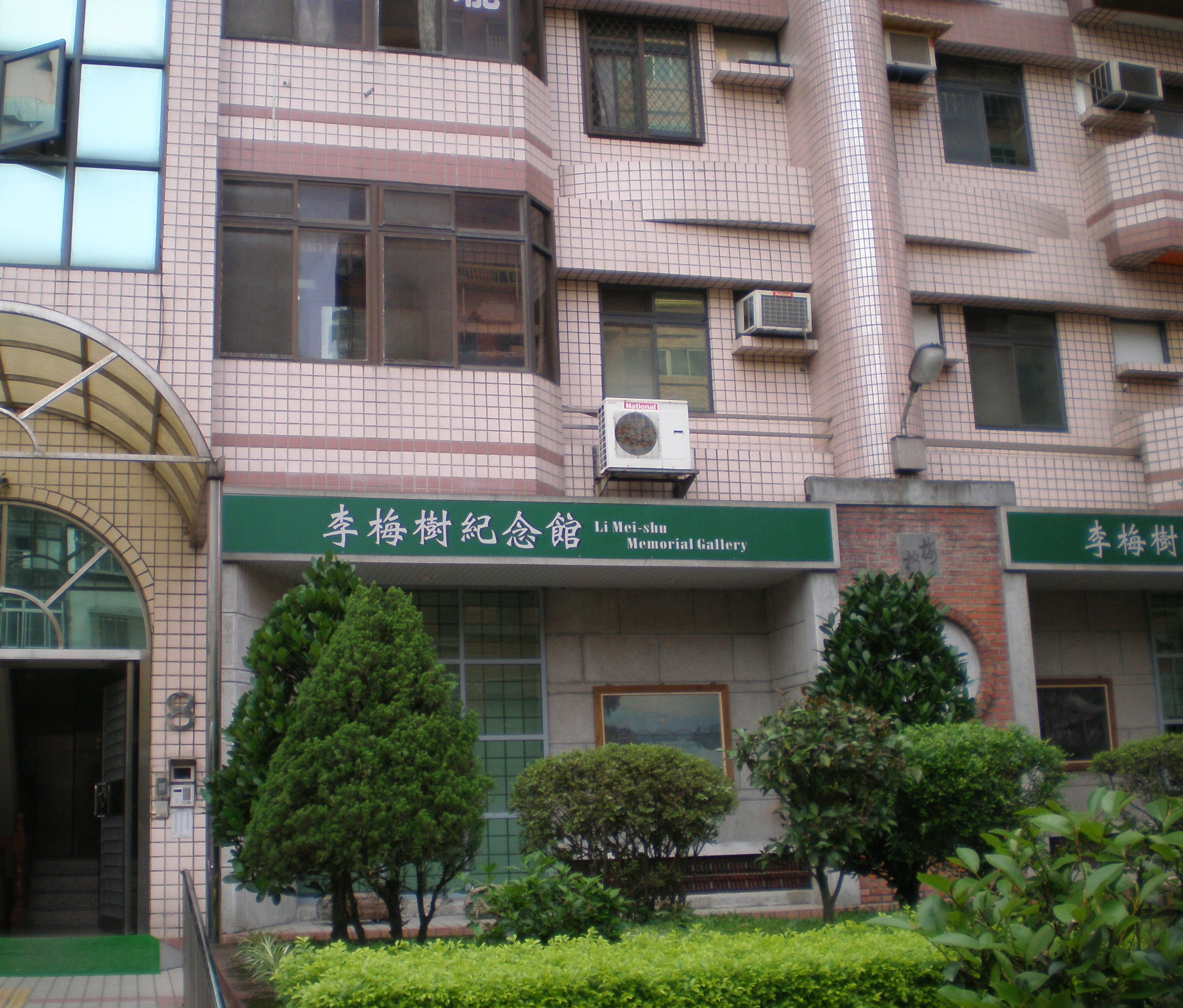
Li Mei-shu Memorial Gallery

The subjects of Li's paintings are depicted in a realist style and are primarily figures, landscapes, and still lifes. Even in the 1950s, when abstract art styles were in favor, his paintings still remained true to realism. Li's paintings demonstrated strong local sentiments and his love for portraying local people and culture. His great love for Sanxia has produced scenic paintings of Sanxia such as Spring Dawn at Sanxia (1977) and Washing Clothes in the River (1981). He also loved to use his family members as models for his paintings and used photographs to provide an outline or base for his work. Li emphasized the characteristics of the people he was painting through details such as the patterns of their clothing and subject's relationship with the background.

== See also ==
- Li Mei-shu Memorial Gallery
