= Manyueyuan National Forest Recreation Area =

Forest in Sanxia, New Taipei, Taiwan

Manyueyuan National Forest Recreation Area Chinese: 滿月圓國家森林遊樂區
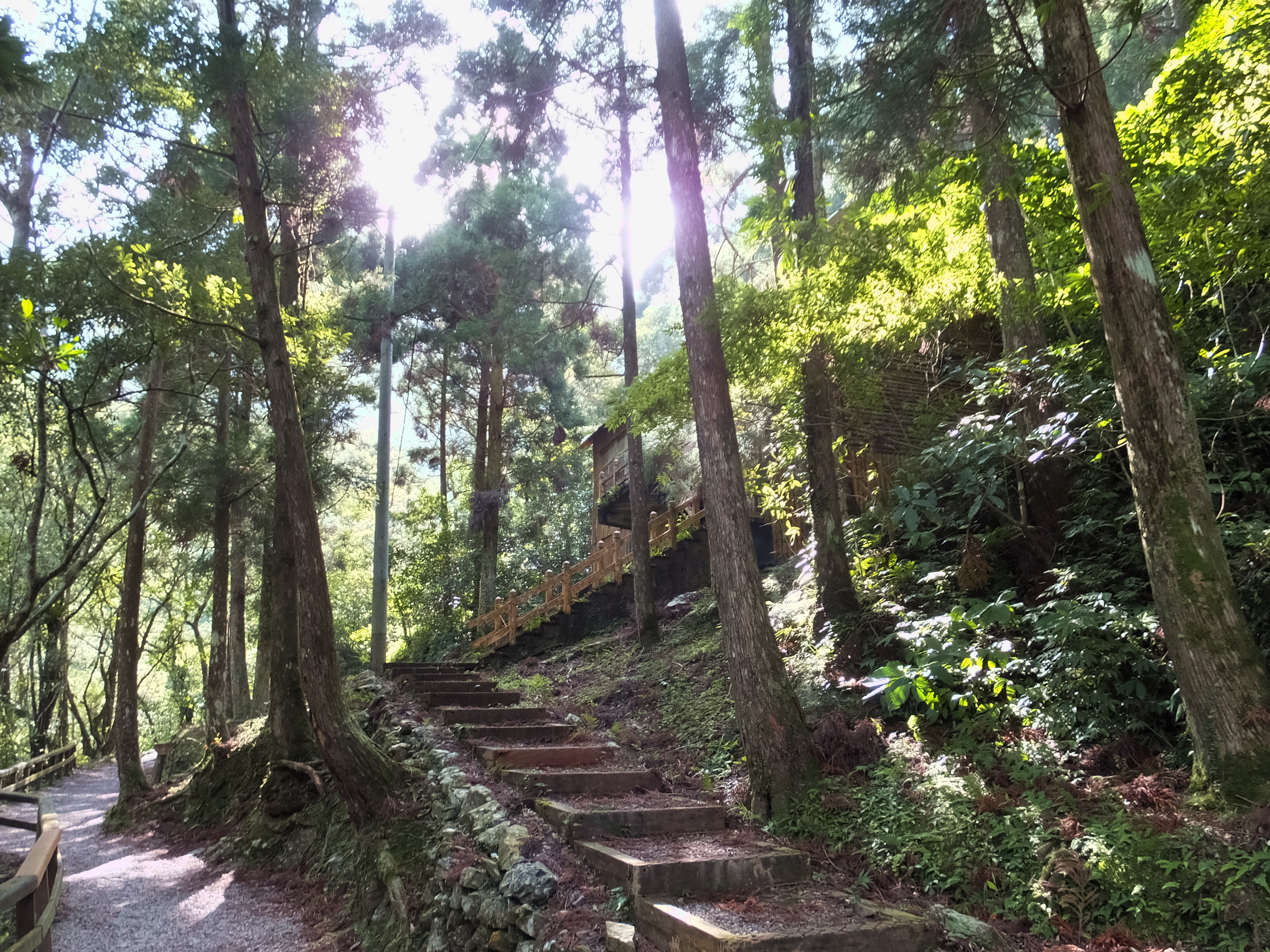

- Location within Taiwan
- Interactive map of Manyueyuan National Forest Recreation Area

Geography
- Location: Sanxia, New Taipei, Taiwan
- Coordinates: 24°49′49.7″N 121°26′40.9″E
- Elevation: 300–1,700 m (980–5,580 ft)
- Area: 637 ha (1,570 acres)

Manyueyuan National Forest Recreation Area (traditional Chinese: 滿月圓國家森林遊樂區; simplified Chinese: 满月圆国家森林游乐区; pinyin: Mǎnyuèyuán Guójiā Sēnlín Yóulè Qū) is a forest located in Sanxia District, New Taipei, Taiwan.

== Geology ==
The forest spans over an area of 637 hectares at an elevation of 300–1,700 meters with an annual mean temperature of 19.9°C. The northern part of the forest shares a border with Mount Beichatian (Chinese: 北插天山).

== Facilities ==
The forest consists of a walking trail connected to Dongyanshan Forest Recreation Area with a length of 1,727 meters. It has campsites at the base of Mount Beichatian. The total length of the forest walking trail is 1,210 meters.

== Transportation ==
The forest is accessible by bus or taxi from Yingge Station of Taiwan Railway.

== See also ==
- Geography of Taiwan
