= Sanxia History Museum =

Museum in Sanxia, New Taipei, Taiwan

- 三峽歷史文物館
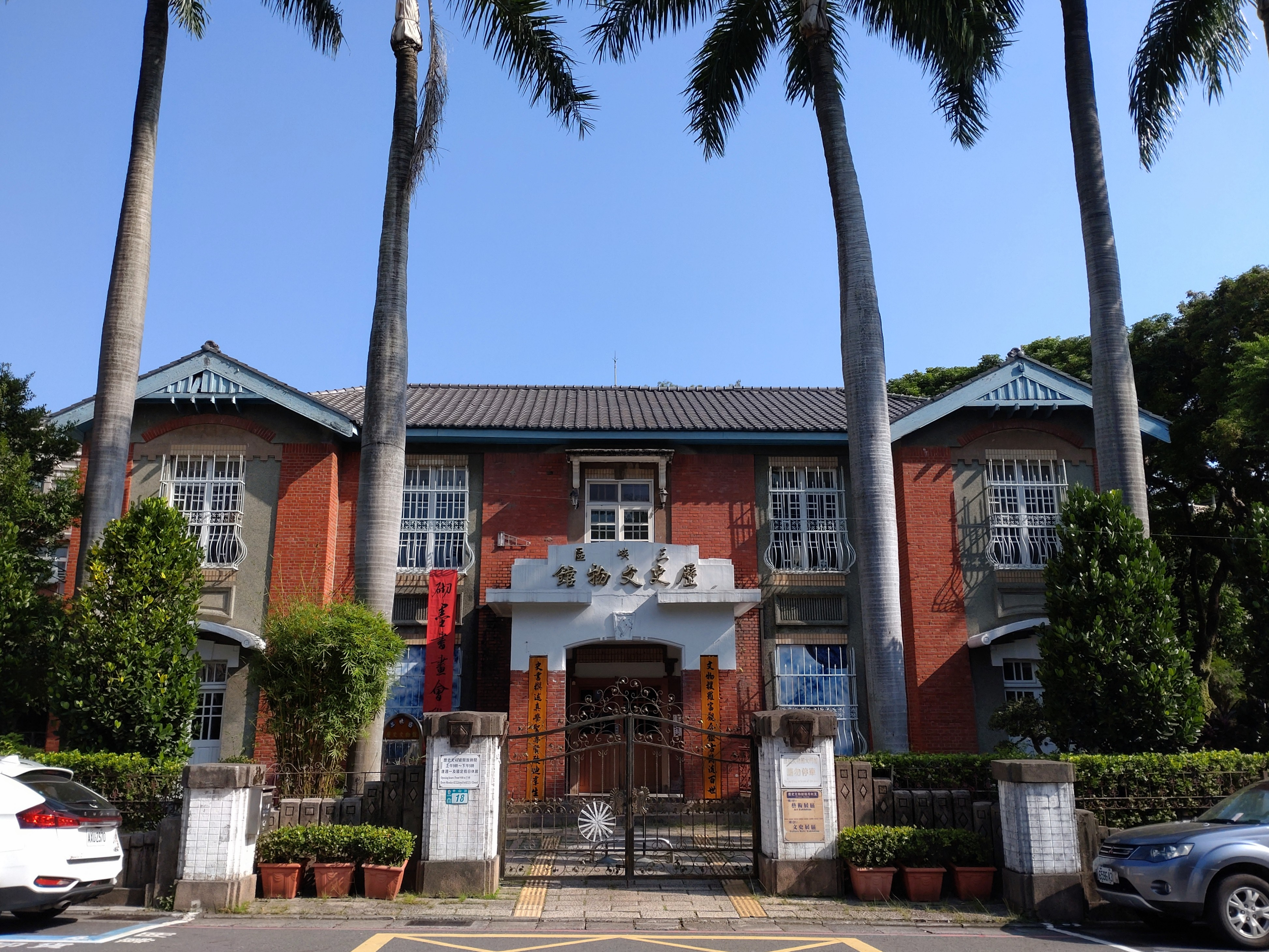
- Established: 2003
- Location: Sanxia, New Taipei, Taiwan
- Coordinates: 24°56′04″N 121°22′10″E
- Type: museum

The Sanxia History Museum (traditional Chinese: 三峽歷史文物館; simplified Chinese: 三峡历史文物馆; pinyin: Sānxiá Lìshǐ Wénwùguǎn) is a museum of local history in Sanxia District, New Taipei, Taiwan.

== History ==
The museum building was originally built as the township office during the Japanese rule in 1929. The reconstruction process to make the museum from the former building started in 1999 for 4 years.

== Architecture ==
The museum is a two-story building. The first floor has an exhibition area that periodically hosts art activities. The second floor has an exhibition area of Sanxia historical items, old time implements and memorabilia.

== Transportation ==
The museum is accessible from National Taipei University Station of Sanying line.

== See also ==
- List of museums in Taiwan
