= Tam Hiệp (disambiguation) =

Tam Hiệp may refer to several places in Vietnam, including:

- Tam Hiệp, Đồng Nai, a ward of Đồng Nai
- Tam Hiệp, Thanh Trì, a former commune of Thanh Trì District in Hanoi
- Tam Hiệp, Phúc Thọ, a former commune of Phúc Thọ District in Hanoi
- Tam Hiệp, Bắc Giang, a former commune of Yên Thế District
- Tam Hiệp, Bến Tre, a former commune of Bình Đại District
- Tam Hiệp, Quảng Nam, a former commune of Núi Thành District
- Tam Hiệp, Tiền Giang, a former commune of Châu Thành District, Tiền Giang
