= Patriarch Ching Chwee =

Chan Buddhist monk from Quanzhou

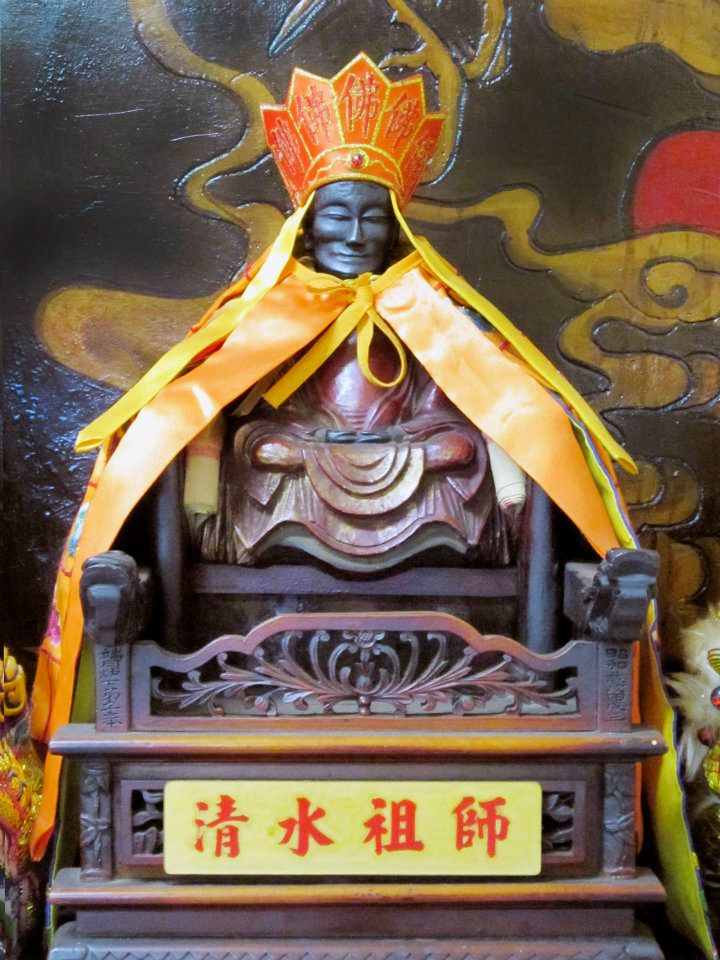
Statue of Qingshui

Patriarch Ching Chwee (Chinese: 清水祖師; pinyin: Qīngshuǐ; Pe̍h-ōe-jī: Chheng-chúi chó͘-su; 1047-1101), also known as Chó͘-su-kong (Chinese: 祖師公; Pe̍h-ōe-jī: Chó͘-su-kong), born Tan Chiau Eng (Chinese: 陳昭應; Pe̍h-ōe-jī: Tân Chiau-èng) was a Chan/Zen Buddhist monk during the Northern Song from Anxi County, Quanzhou. He was said to have gained supernatural powers through his skill in learning and preaching the Dharma and meditation. Through this, he is said to have saved the town of Anxi during a period of drought, bringing rain as he went from place to place. In reverence, the villagers built shrines to him and hence became a deity in Chinese folk religion.

Patriarch Ching Chwee is also known by the following nicknames:

- Dropping Nose Ancestor (Chinese: 落鼻祖師公; Pe̍h-ōe-jī: La̍k-phīⁿ chó͘-su-kong), known for the prominent nose featured in Patriarch Ching Chwee's effigies
- Black Faced Ancestor (Chinese: 烏面祖師公; Pe̍h-ōe-jī: o͘-bīn-chó͘-su-kong)

Worship of Patriarch Ching Chwee (清水祖师) is especially popular in Taiwan, where he is worshiped by local villagers for protection and in overseas Hokkien-speaking communities. His birthday is celebrated on the sixth day of the first lunar month.

== Life ==
Tan Chiau Eng was born in 1047. He became a monk when he was young, and his early potential was recognized by the chief monk at the temple. When the chief monk died, Tan Chiau Eng became the next chief monk at the temple. He is credited with many famous quotes made during his lifetime.

== Achievements ==
Some of his achievements included:

- building bridges- He helped build more than 10 different bridges around the towns.
- herb medicine creation- In China, there is a saying "When you save the life of one, it will even help you more than reaching heaven when you die." And he has learned about many different medical herbs. And his achievements in medicine are even on-par to those of professionals in that era.
- praying for rain- Normal people believe that there is no man that can control the weather, only a man of great spiritual cultivation will be able to achieve this. And when Patriarch Ching Chwee was alive, he performed numerous miracles in praying for rain during times of drought.

== Worship ==
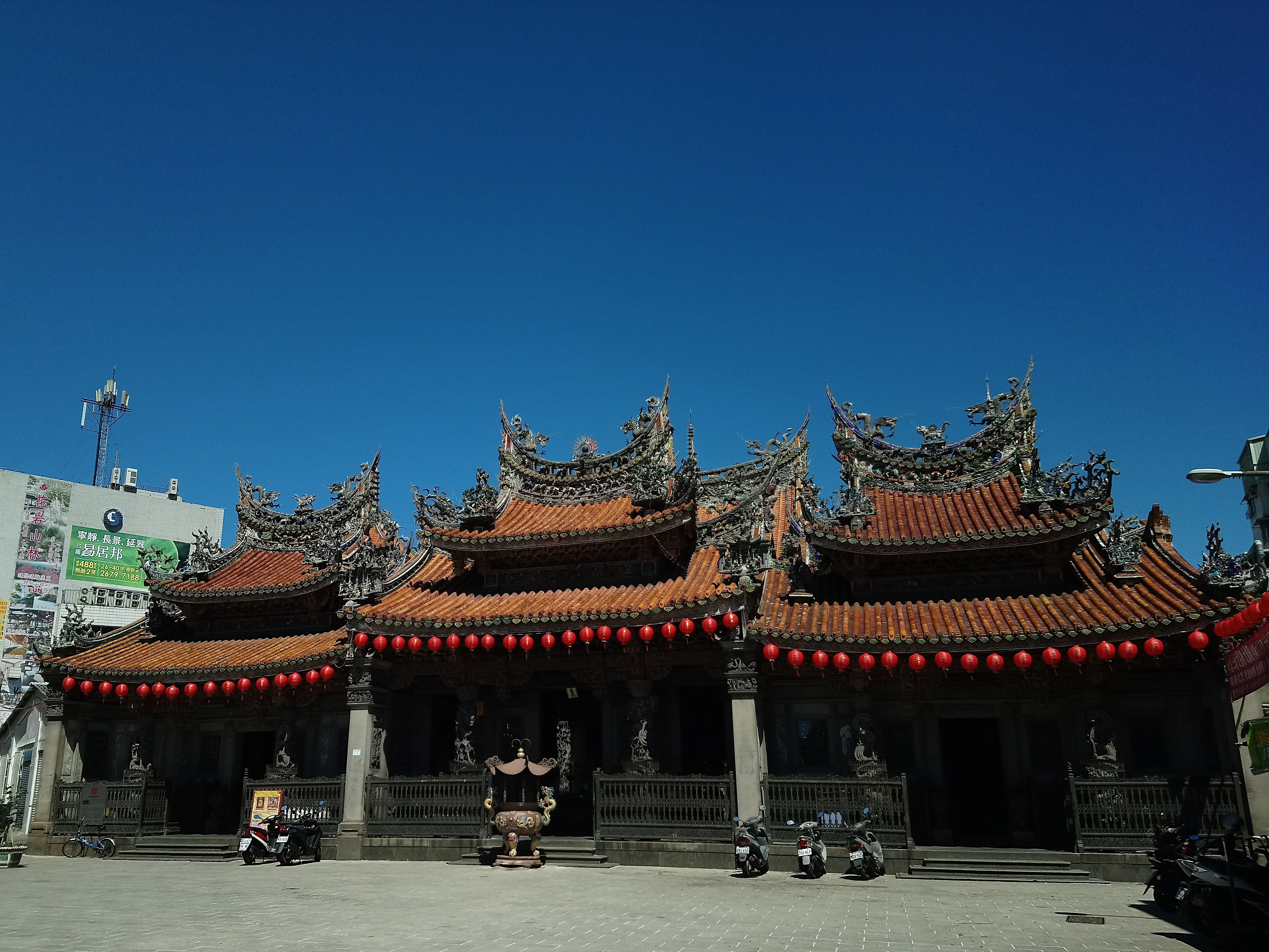
Zushi Temple in Taipei is dedicated to Patriarch Ching Chwee.

It is stated that all the devotees would worship Patriarch Ching Chwee by using fruit, cakes and other vegetarian food as offering items on the Deity's birthday (on the sixth day of first lunar month) every year to express their devotion and gratitude. And up till now, many worshippers will frequently visit his temples throughout the years to pray for his divine blessings and protections. Some also believe they will gain good blessings for the rest of the year after faithfully worshipped in His temples. God pigs are also a popular sacrifice at certain Patriarch Ching Chwee temples among the Hakka community in Taiwan.

== Temples with altars dedicated to Patriarch Ching Chwee ==
- Ching Chwee Gam Temple: (清水岩), Anxi County, Quanzhou, Fujian, China
- Ching Chwee Temple: (艋舺清水巖), Wanhua, Taipei, Taiwan
- Zushi Temple: (三峽長福巖), New Taipei, Taiwan
- Ching Chwee Temple: (清水宮), Zuoying, Kaohsiung, Taiwan
- Chin Swee Caves Temple: (清水岩庙), Genting Highlands, Pahang, Malaysia
- Snake Temple: (祖师公庙), Penang, Malaysia
- Fushan Temple: (福山寺), Yangon, Myanmar
- Saw Si Gone Temple: Mawlamyine, Myanmar
- Hock Guan Kong Temple: Phuket, Thailand
- Shun Heng Keng: Bangkok, Thailand
- Chaweng d Jo Su Jui Kong Shrine: Krabi, Thailand
- Hong Lai Sze: (蓬莱寺), Hougang, Singapore
- Peng Lai Dian: (蓬莱殿), Admiralty Street, Woodlands, Singapore
- Long Xu Yan Temple: (龙须岩金水馆), Ang Mo Kio, Singapore
- Ching Chwee Temple: (清水庙东圣殿), Woodlands, Singapore
- Hock An Kiong Temple: (福安宫), Batam, Riau Islands, Indonesia
- Hock Liong Kiong Temple: (福隆宫), Dumai, Riau, Indonesia
- Kongco Tjo Soe Kong Temple: Tanjung Kait, Tangerang, Banten, Indonesia
- Bio Tjou Soe Kong: Karawang, West Java, Indonesia
- Ceng Sui Co Su Kong Temple: (清水祖師公), Cengkareng, Jakarta, Indonesia
- Vihara Sapta Ronggo: Gambir, Jakarta, Indonesia
- Vihara Dharma Loka: (保安宫), Makassar, South Sulawesi, Indonesia
