= Sanxia River =

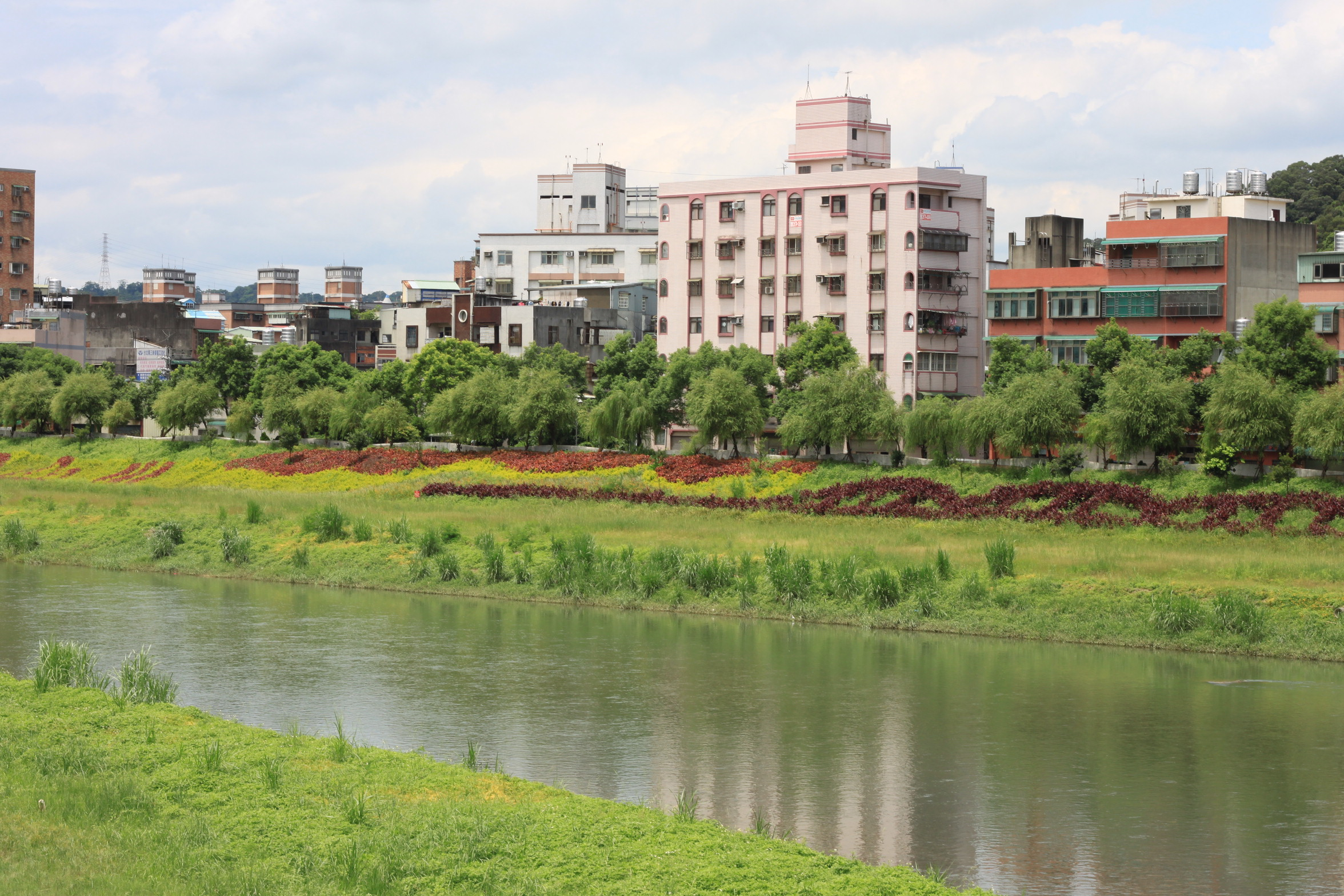
- Native name: 三峽河 (Chinese)

Location
- Location: New Taipei, Taiwan

Physical characteristics
- Mouth: Dahan River
- Length: 28.5 km (17.7 mi)

The Sanxia River (Chinese: 三峽河; Hanyu Pinyin: Sānxiá Hé; Tongyong Pinyin: Sansiá Hé; Wade–Giles: San^{1}-hsia^{2} Ho^{2}; Pe̍h-ōe-jī: Sam-kiap-hô) is a tributary of the Dahan River in New Taipei City, northern Taiwan. The Sanxia is 28.5 kilometres (17.7 mi) long, with a 200-square-kilometre (77 mi^{2}) drainage basin. The river flows through Tucheng District, Shulin District and a small portion of Daxi District in Taoyuan City.

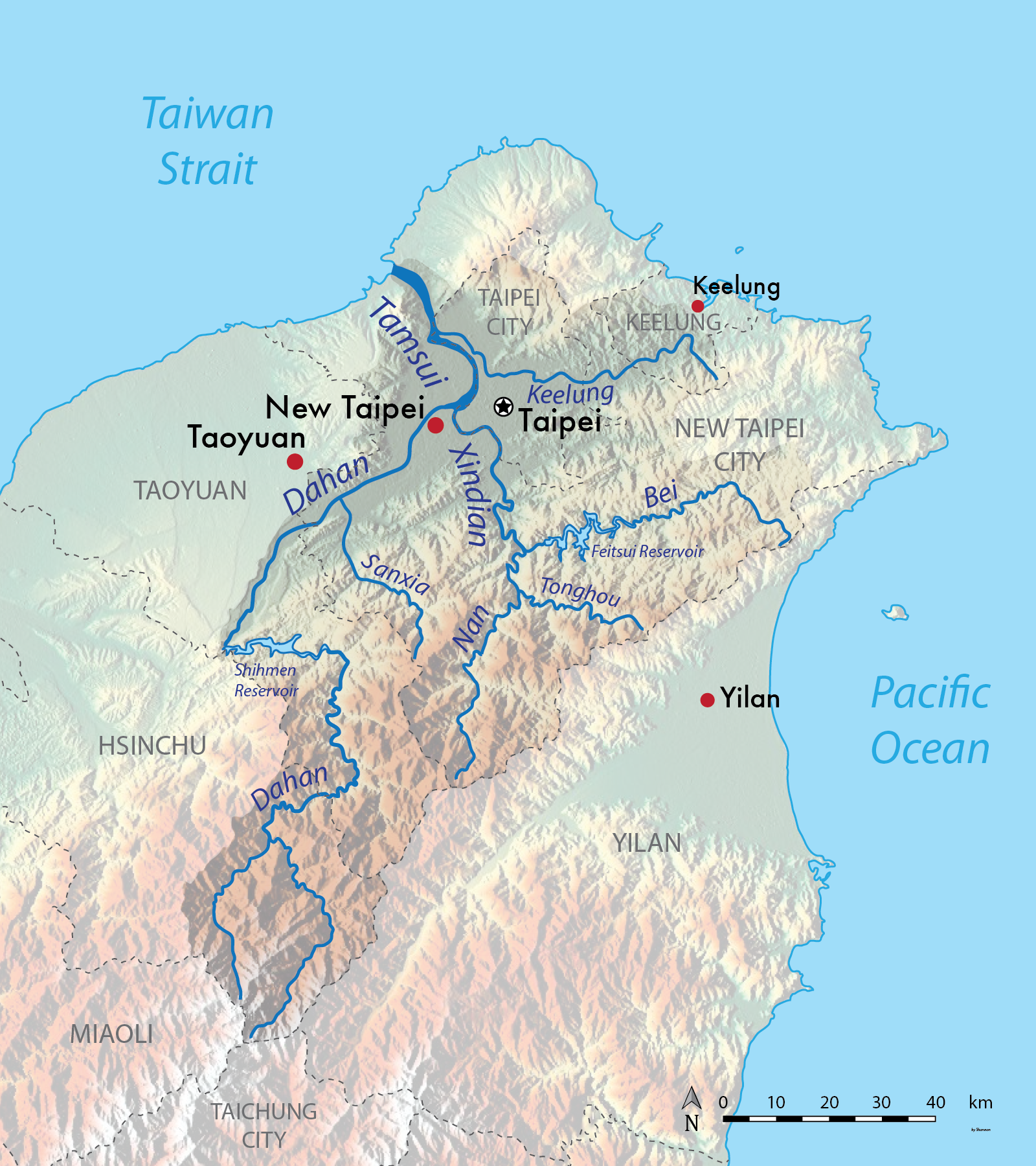
Map showing the location of the Sanxia River within the Tamsui River watershed

== See also ==
- List of rivers in Taiwan
