= List of beaches in Taiwan =

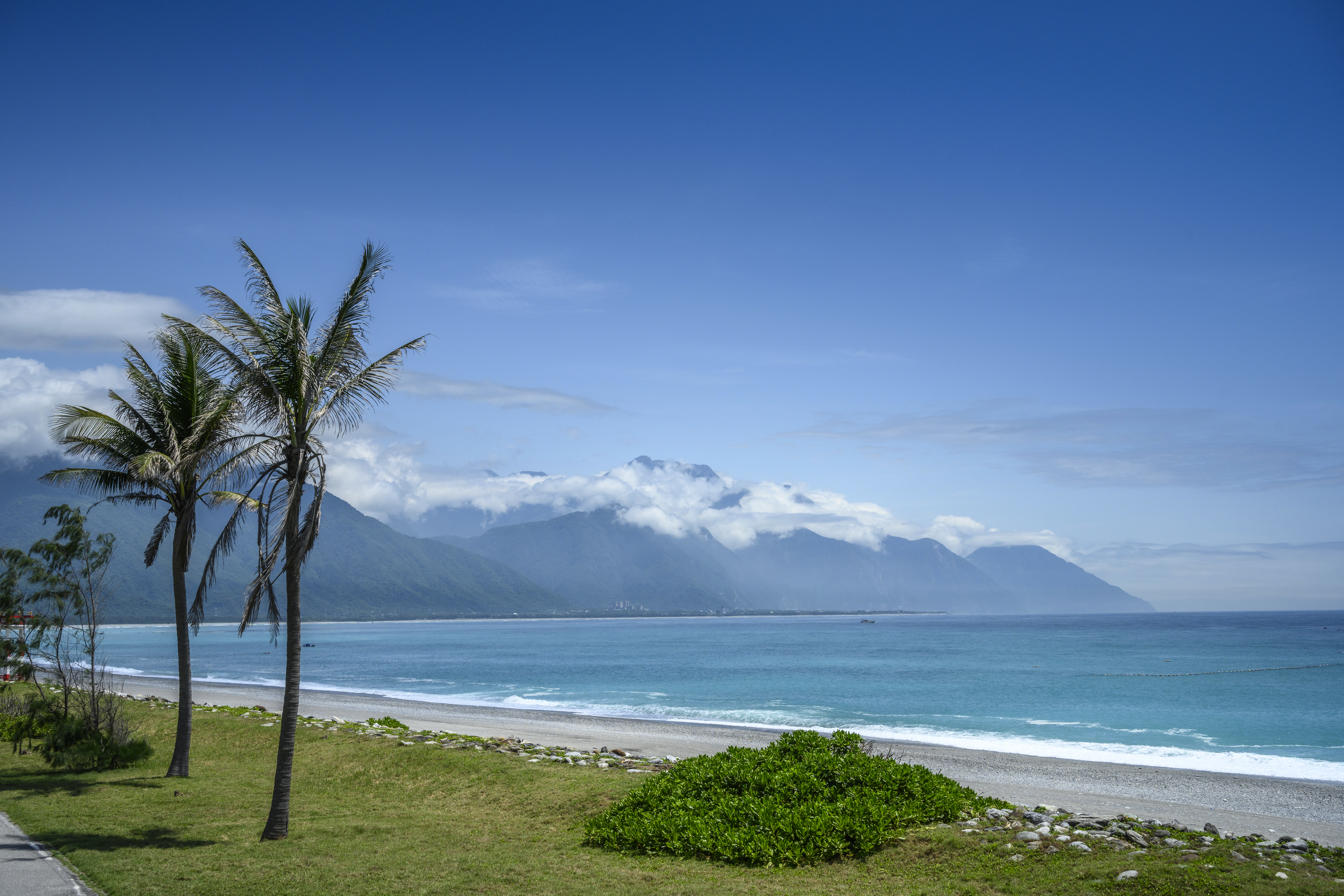
Palm trees sway in sunny Qixingtan Beach.

This is a list of beaches in Taiwan.

== Beaches in Taiwan ==
=== Main island ===
- Baisha Bay, New Taipei
- Fulong Beach, New Taipei
- Green Bay, New Taipei
- Honeymoon Bay, Yilan County
- Manzhou Beach, Pingtung County
- Neipi Beach, Yilan County
- Qixingtan Beach, Hualien County
- Sanxiantai, Taitung County
- Sizihwan, Kaohsiung
- South Bay, Pingtung County
- Yanliao Beach Park, New Taipei
- Hengchun Beach
- Kenting National Park Beach

=== External islands ===
- Mysterious Little Bay, Lienchiang County

== Gallery ==
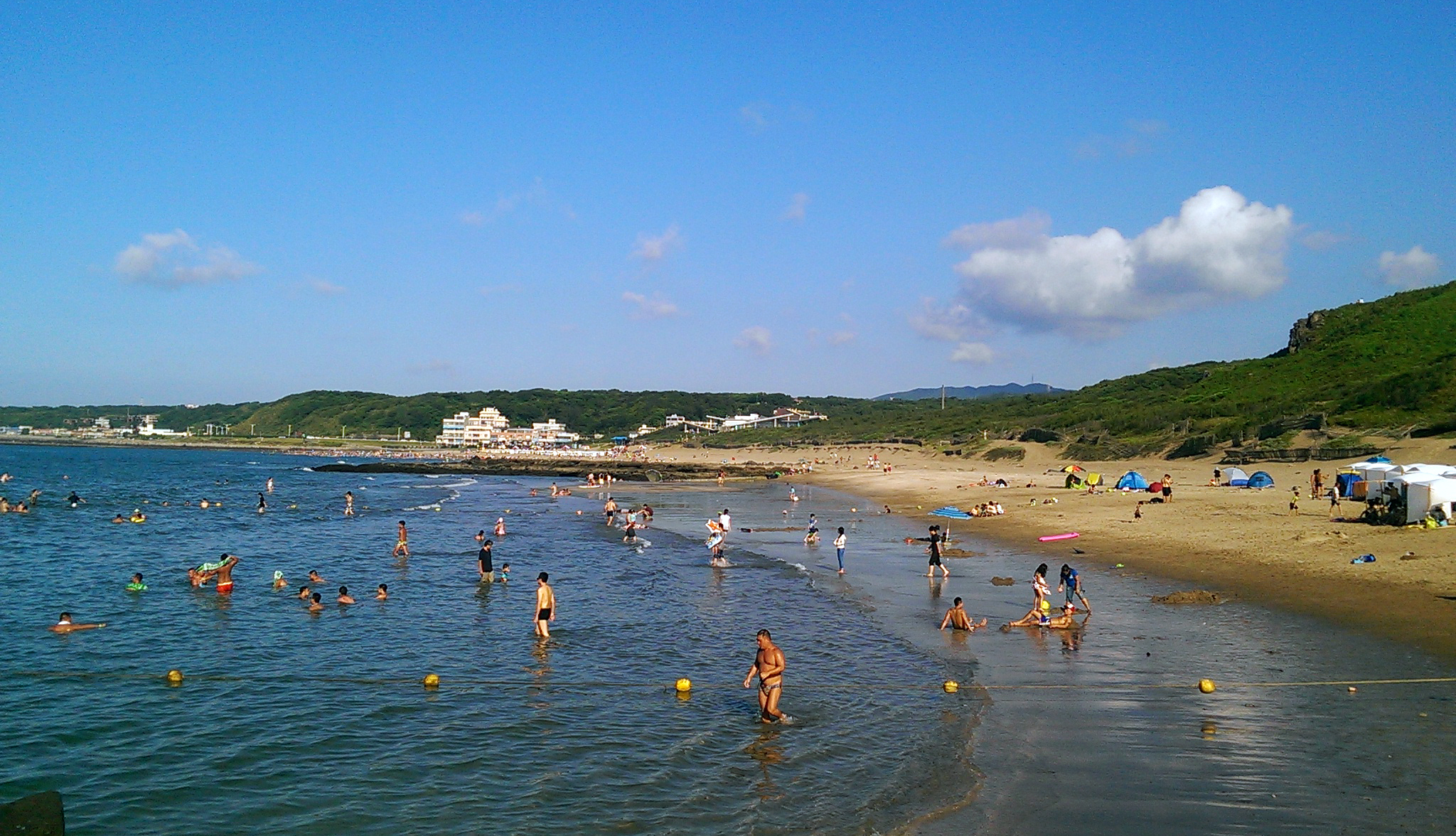
Baisha Bay

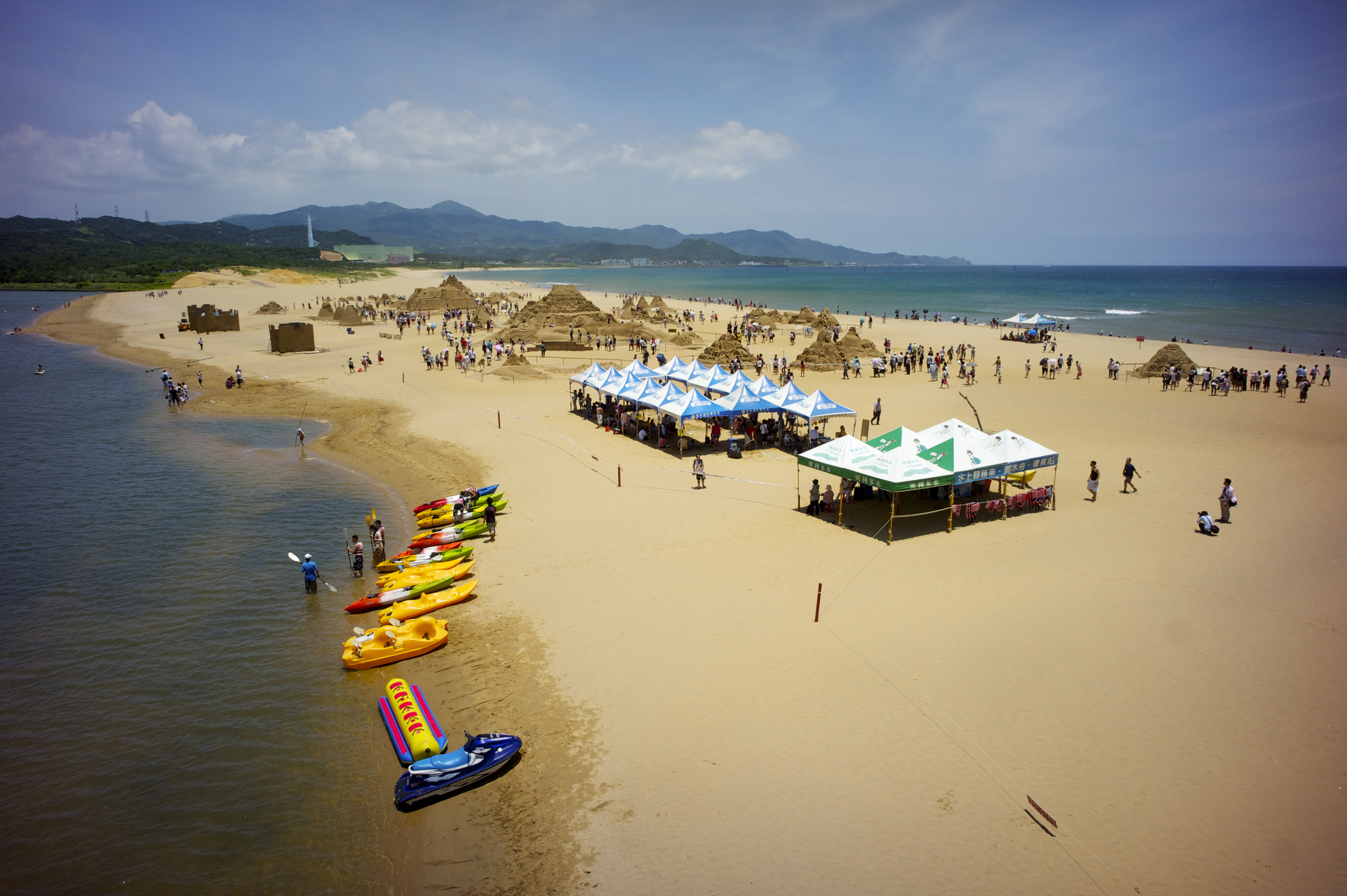
Yanliao Beach Park

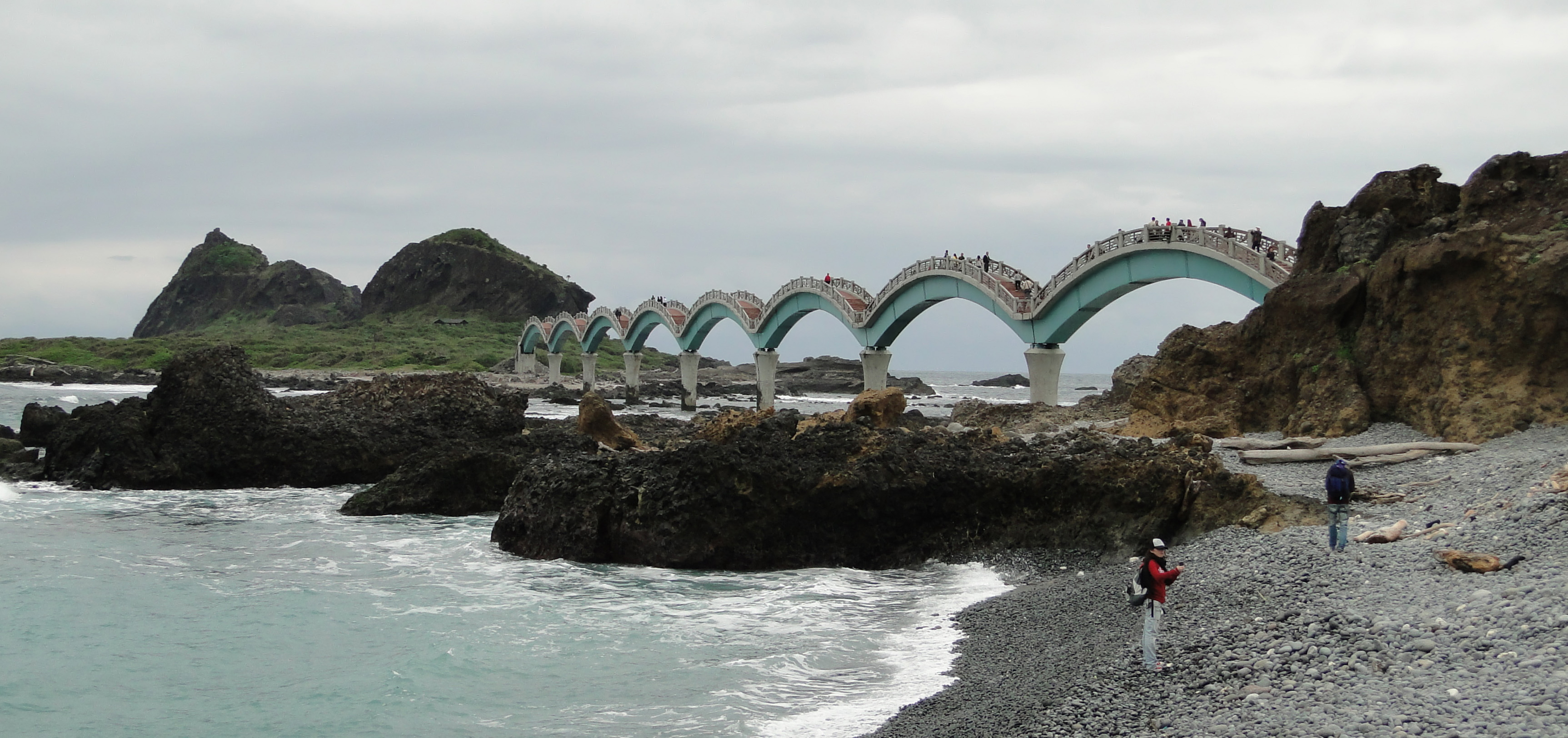
Sanxiantai

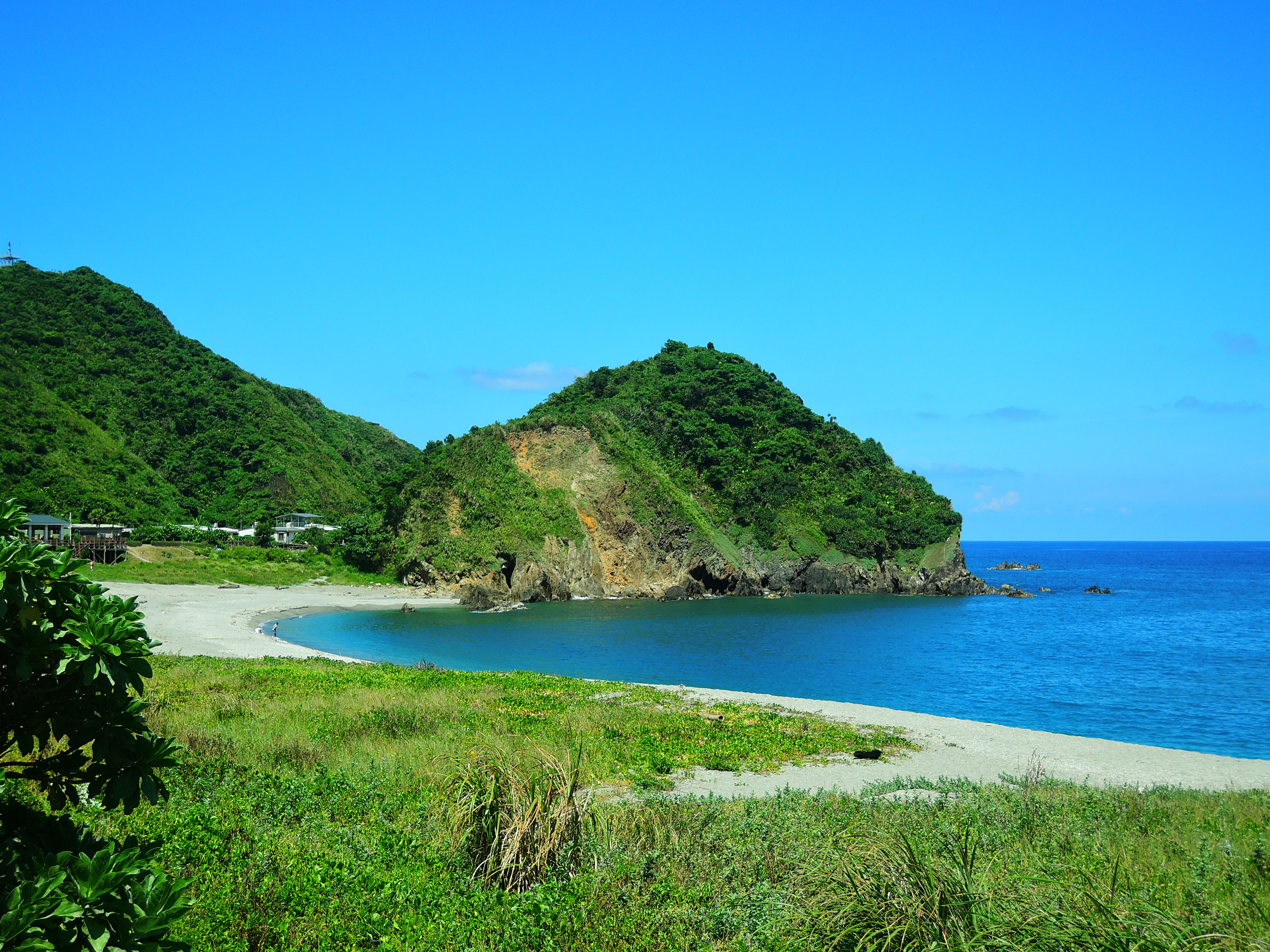
Neipi Beach

== See also ==
- List of beaches
