= Fulong =

Fulong may refer to:

== People ==
- Chew Hock Leong (Chinese: 周福隆; pinyin: Zhōu Fúlóng; c. 1897 – 1967), Singaporean banker
- Khoo Fuk-lung (Chinese: 邱福龙; pinyin: Qīu Fúlóng), Hong Kong manhua artist and writer
- Song Fulong (Chinese: 宋福龙), Chinese politician

== Places ==
=== Taiwan ===
- Fulong Village (Chinese: 福隆), village in Gongliao District, New Taipei City, Taiwan

- Fulong Beach
- Fulong railway station

=== Mainland China ===
==== Townships ====
- Fulong Township, Baisha Li Autonomous County (Chinese: 阜龙乡), township in Baisha Li Autonomous County, Hainan, China
- Fulong Township, Daxin County (Chinese: 福隆乡), township in Daxin County, Chongzuo, Guangxi, China
- Fulong Township, Hukou County (Chinese: 付垅乡), township in Hukou County, Jiujiang, Jiangxi, China
- Fulong Township, Qianwei County (Chinese: 伏龙乡), township in Qianwei County, Leshan, Sichuan, China
- Fulong Township, Shizhong District (Chinese: 伏龙镇), township in Shizhong District, Neijiang, Sichuan, China
- Fulong Township, Yizhou District (Chinese: 福龙乡), township in Yizhou District, Hechi, Guangxi, China

==== Towns ====
- Fulong, Fangcheng District (Chinese: 扶隆镇), town in Fangcheng District, Fangchengguang, Guangxi, China
- Fulong, Xuzhou District (Chinese: 复龙镇), town in Xuzhou District, Yibin, Sichuan, China
- Fulong, Yuechi County (Chinese: 伏龙镇), town in Yuechi County, Guang'an, Sichuan, China

== Other uses ==
- Chinese torpedo boat Fulong (Chinese: 福龙)
