= Turtle Island (disambiguation) =

Turtle Island is a name for Earth or North America, used by some American Indigenous peoples.

Turtle Island may also refer to:

== Places ==
- Turtle Island (Newcastle Bay), Torres Strait Islands archipelago, Australia
- Turtle Island, Bermuda
- Turtle Island Resort, Nanuya Levu, Fiji
- Vatoa, Lau Islands, Fiji
- Kusu Island, Singapore
- Turtle Island (Matsu), Taiwan
- Guishan Island (Yilan), Taiwan
- Ko Tao, Thailand
- Turtle Island (Lake Erie), United States

== Arts and entertainment ==
=== Music ===
- Turtle Island, a 1989 album by Paul Hyde
- "Turtle Island", a song by Mike Oldfield from the 2002 album Tres Lunas
- "Turtle Island", a song by Beach House from the 2008 album Devotion
- Turtle Island Quartet, an American string quartet

=== Literature ===
- Turtle Island (book), a 1974 book of poetry by Gary Snyder
- Turtle Island: Tales of the Algonquian Nations, a 1999 children's book by Jane Louise Curry
- Turtle Island News, a weekly community newspaper in Ontario, Canada
- Turtle Island (cookbook), 2025 cookbook by Sean Sherman

== Other uses ==
- Turtle Island (horse) (1991–2014), British-trained Thoroughbred racehorse
- Turtle Island Foods, makers of the Tofurky brand of soy products
- Turtle Island Recycling, a recycling and waste company that was merged into GFL Environmental

== See also ==
- Tortuga Island (disambiguation), Spanish language for Turtle Island
- Turtle Group National Park, Australia
- Turtle Mountain (disambiguation)
- Aspidochelone, a fabled sea creature, said to be mistaken for an island
