= Northeast and Yilan Coast National Scenic Area =

Scenic area in Taiwan

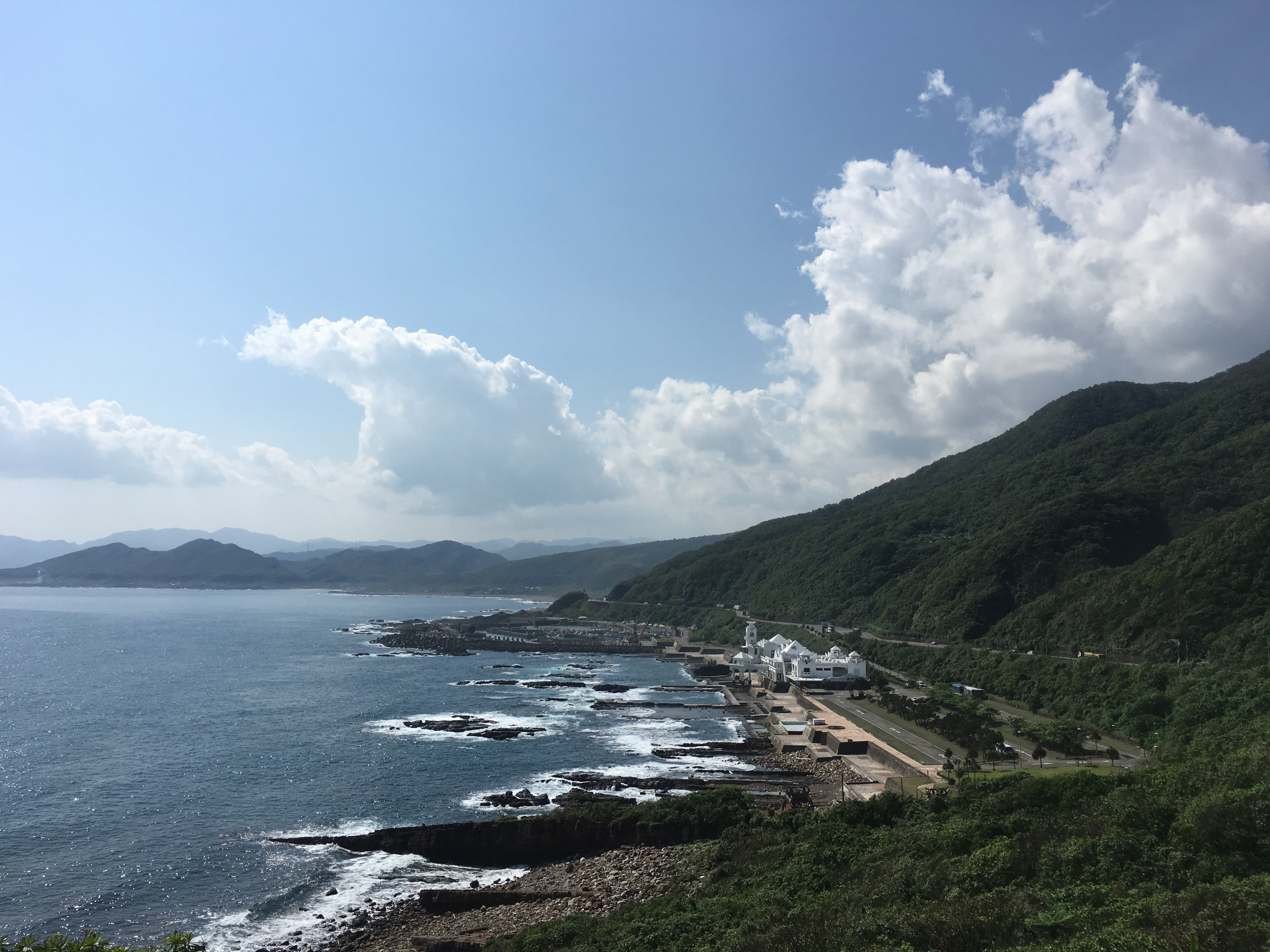
Longdongwan Bay.

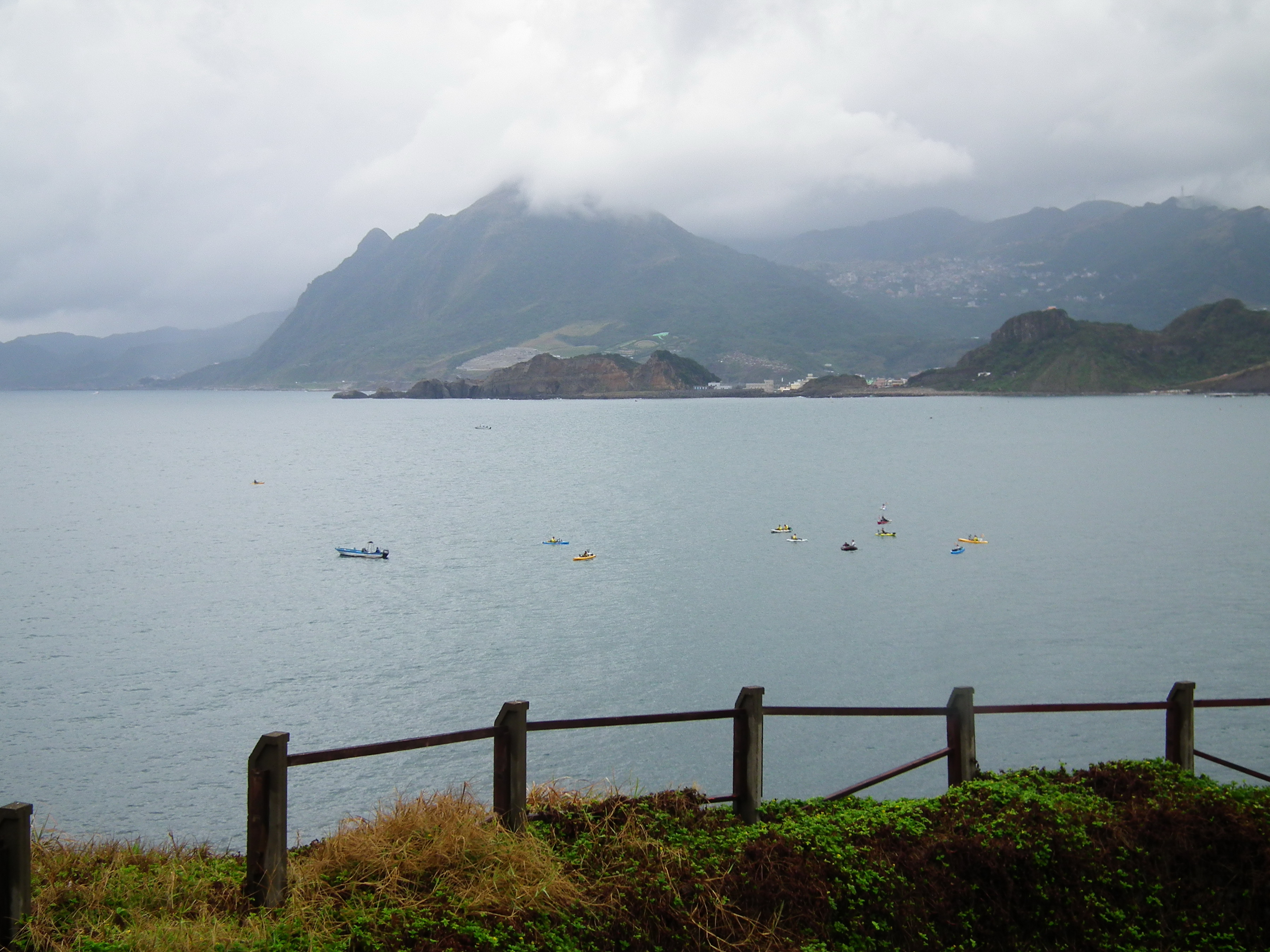
View of Keelung Mountain and Jiufen.

The Northeast and Yilan Coast National Scenic Area (NEYC; traditional Chinese: 東北角及宜蘭海岸國家風景區; simplified Chinese: 东北角及宜兰海岸国家风景区; pinyin: Dōngběi Jiǎo Jí Yílán Hǎi'àn Guójiā Fēngjǐng Qū), previously known as Northeast Coast National Scenic Area, is an area in northeastern Taiwan with special geographical and historical distinction.

== Location ==
The Scenic Area ranges from Nanya Borough, Ruifang District, New Taipei in the north to North Porth of Toucheng Township, Yilan County, and covers Ruifang and Gongliao District of New Taipei and Toucheng Township of Yilan.

== History ==
In December 1979, the "Report for Northeast Coast Special Scenic Area Planning" by the Tourism Bureau, Ministry of Transportation and Communications of Taiwan was commended to National Chengchi University and was ratified by Executive Yuan in February 1982.

The Scenic Area was founded on 1 June 1984 and promoted to a National Scenic Area on 1 July 1995.

== Headquarters ==
The duties of the Northeast and Yilan Coast National Scenic Area Headquarters include maintenance and patrol of the area. They also provide information and services, such as online applications for:

- Visiting Gueishan Island
- Pleasure-boat sailing and docking at ports of the Longdongwan preservation area.
- A multimedia guide to the Scenic Area

The Headquarters office is located at No. 36 Singlong St., Fulong Village, Gongliao Country, just near the Fulong Bathing Beach.

== Scenic spots ==
- Jinguashi and Jiufen, the main gold mining site of Taiwan during the Qing dynasty and Japanese rule.
- Bitou Cape
- Longdongwan Bay
- Yanliao Beach Park and golden beaches
- Fulong Beach
- Lailai Rock Fishing Area around Shicheng Village, Toucheng Township
- Caoliing Ancient Trail, a trail built during the Qing dynasty between Dali Village, Toucheng Town and Gongliao Township.
- Honeymoon Bay
- Gueishan Island, visiting the island or whale watching
- Beiguan Park, for watching crashing waves

== See also ==
- List of national scenic areas in Taiwan
