= Oceaniovalibus =

Scientific classification
- Domain: Bacteria
- Kingdom: Pseudomonadati
- Phylum: Pseudomonadota
- Class: Alphaproteobacteria
- Order: Rhodobacterales
- Family: Rhodobacteraceae
- Genus: Oceaniovalibus; Liu et al. 2012

Species
- "O. guishaninsula"

Genus of bacteria

"Oceaniovalibus" is a Gram-negative genus of bacteria from the family of Rhodobacteraceae with one known species ("Oceaniovalibus guishaninsula"). "Oceaniovalibus guishaninsula" has been isolated from seawater from the coast of Guishan Island in Taiwan.
