= Shuang =

Shuang may refer to:

== Given name ==
- Cao Shuang (died 249), military general, politician and regent of the state of Cao Wei during the Three Kingdoms period
- Cheng Shuang (born 1987), Chinese female aerial skier who competed at the 2010 Winter Olympics
- Guo Shuang (郭爽) (born 1986), Chinese professional track cyclist
- Li Shuang (artist) (李爽) (born 1957), contemporary Chinese artist
- Li Shuang (field hockey) (born 1978), female Chinese field hockey player who competed at the 2004 Summer Olympics
- Wang Shuang (Cao Wei) (died 228), military general of Cao Wei during the Three Kingdoms period of Chinese history
- Xiong Shuang (熊霜) (died 822 BC)the 12th viscount of the state of Chu during the Western Zhou Dynasty of ancient China
- Xun Shuang (荀爽) (128-190), politician and historian of the late Han Dynasty of the Chinese history
- Zhang Shuang (speed skater) (born 1986), Chinese female long-track speed-skater
- Zhang Shuang (ice hockey) (born 1987), Chinese female ice hockey player
- Zhao Shuang (born 1990), basketball player for China women's national basketball team
- Zheng Shuang (born 1991) (郑双)(born 1991), Chinese actress and singer
- Zhu Shuang, Prince of Qin (朱樉) (1328–1398), son of Hongwu Emperor
- Zhuge Shuang (諸葛爽) (died 886), general of the Chinese dynasty Tang Dynasty

== Surname ==
- Shuang (surname) (雙/双), listed in the Hundred Family Surnames
- Shuang Xuetao (born 1983), Chinese novelist

== Places ==
- Shuang River (Chinese: 雙溪; Pe̍h-ōe-jī: Siang-khoe), a river in Taiwan
