= Gueishan =

Gueishan (龜山) may refer to:

1. Guishan District, Taoyuan City, Taiwan (Republic of China)
2. Gueishan Island, Yilan County, Taiwan (Republic of China)
