= Tortuga (disambiguation) =

Tortuga is a Caribbean island that forms part of Haiti.

Tortuga may also refer to:

== Geography ==
- Tortugas, Argentina, a town in Santa Fe Province, Argentina
- Tortugas Banks, coral reefs in the Florida Keys National Marine Sanctuary
- Tortuga Bay, a bay on Santa Cruz Island in the Galapagos
- Tortuga Island (disambiguation)
- Dry Tortugas, a group of islands in the Florida Keys in the United States
- Freeport Tortuga, a free port project on Tortuga, Haiti, during the early 1970s

== Art, entertainment, and media ==
- Tortuga (Breaking Bad), a fictional drug dealer in the AMC-TV drama, Breaking Bad
- Tortuga: Pirates of the New World, a computer game set in the Golden Age of Piracy era
- Tortuga: Two Treasures, 2007 video game
- Tortuga, a fictional aircraft in the children's television show Wild Kratts
- Tortuga Isle, a safe haven for fugitive pirates, featured prominently in Pirates of the Caribbean: The Curse of the Black Pearl (2003)
- Tortuga, a novel by Rudolfo Anaya
- "Tortuga", a single by Alestorm from their 2020 album Curse of the Crystal Coconut

== Sports ==
- Coliseo La Tortuga, an indoor sporting arena in Talcahuano, Chile
- Daytona Tortugas, a Class A-Advanced minor league baseball team in the Florida State League

== Transportation ==
- Tortuga (vehicle), a Venezuelan armored vehicle
- SS Antigua, later called SS Tortuga, a turbo-electric liner
- USS Tortuga (LSD-26), a Casa Grande-class dock landing ship commissioned in 1945, in action during the Korean War and the Vietnam War, and decommissioned in 1970
- USS Tortuga (LSD-46), a Whidbey Island-class dock landing ship commissioned in 1990 and on active service as of 2012

== Other uses ==
- Tortuga (cocktail), a non-alcoholic cocktail beverage
- Tortuga (software), a software framework for discrete event simulation
