= Hohaiyan Rock Festival =

Rock festival in Bali, New Taipei, Taiwan

Hohaiyan Rock Festival 貢寮國際海洋音樂祭
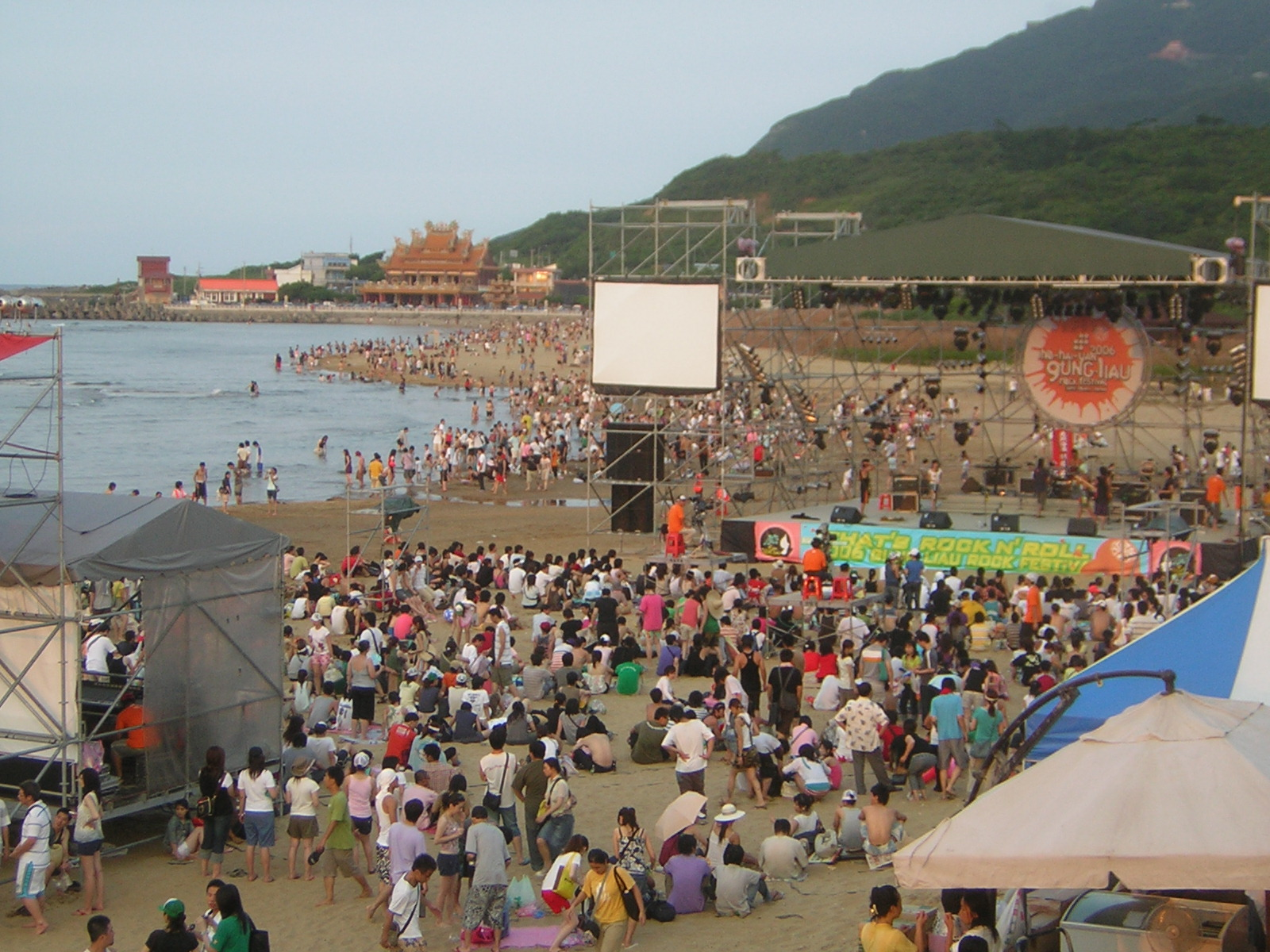
- Genre: Rock
- Locations: Fulong Beach, Gongliao, New Taipei, Taiwan
- Years active: 2000–2019

The Hohaiyan Rock Festival (Chinese: 貢寮國際海洋音樂祭; Tongyong Pinyin: Gòngliáo Guójì Hǎiyáng Yīnyuèjì; Tâi-lô: Kòng-liâu kok-tsè hái-iûnn im-ga̍k-tsè) was an annual Taiwan rock music festival held in Fulong Beach, Gongliao District, New Taipei, Taiwan.

== Names ==
The name "Hohaiyan" came from the historical fact that Taiwan is an island surrounded by sea and waves. Taiwanese aborigines heard the wave sound coming to shore with a melody of "ho-hai-yan", thus "Hohaiyan" ever since has signified waves and oceans to them.

== History ==
This free music event first started in 2000 on 15 July.

Because the festival was inactive from 2020-2022, due to the COVID-19 pandemic, the decision was made to terminate the festival in 2023.

== Performers ==
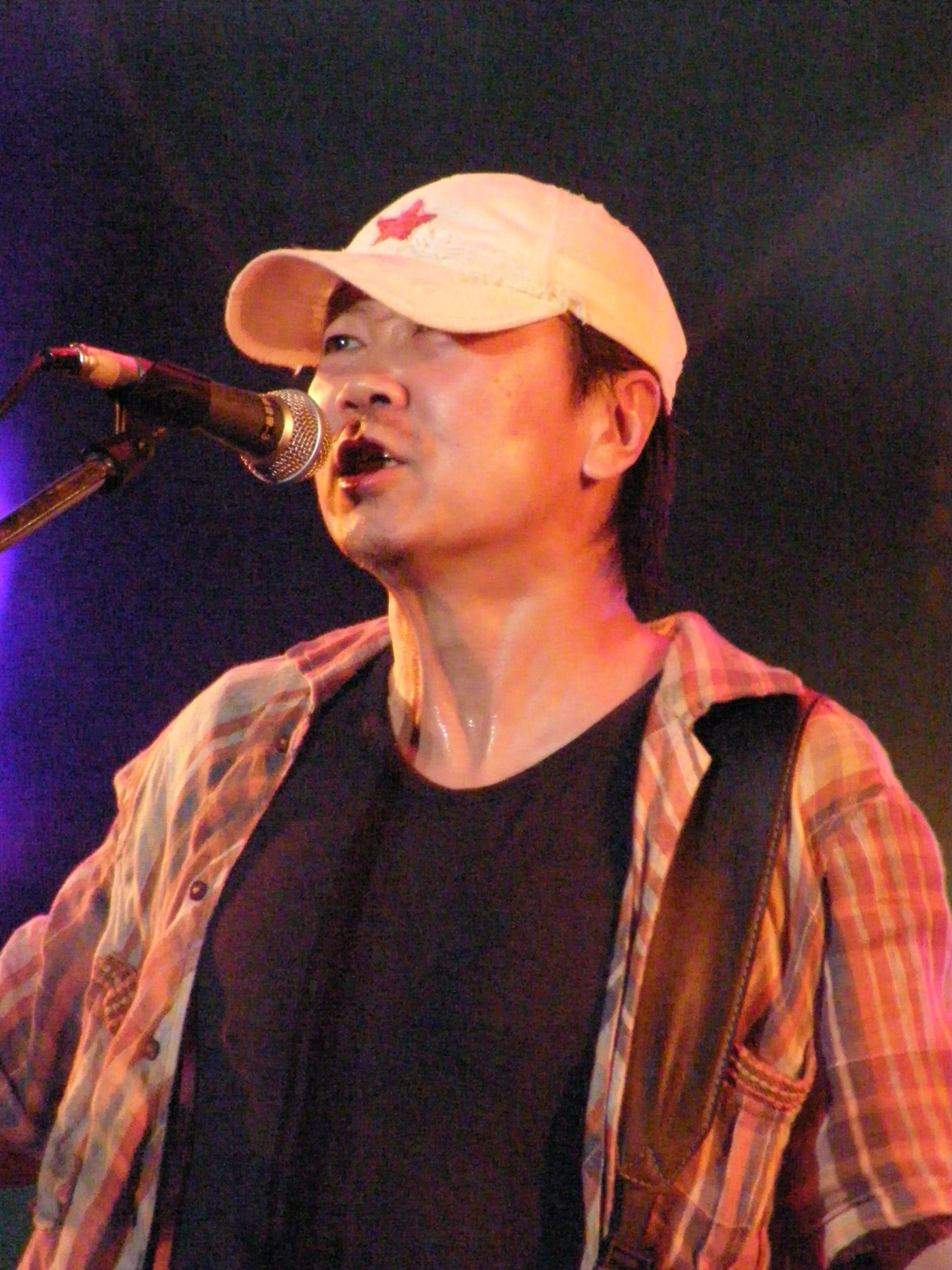
Cui Jian performing at the 2007 Hohaiyan Rock Festival

=== Taiwan ===
Notable musicians from Taiwan have performed in this concert, such as Mayday.

=== Outside Taiwan ===
Many from outside Taiwan have also performed, such as Baseball from Australia, Canada, Mainland China, Hong Kong, Japan, Nepal, Malaysia, Singapore, Switzerland, United States etc.

== Transportation ==
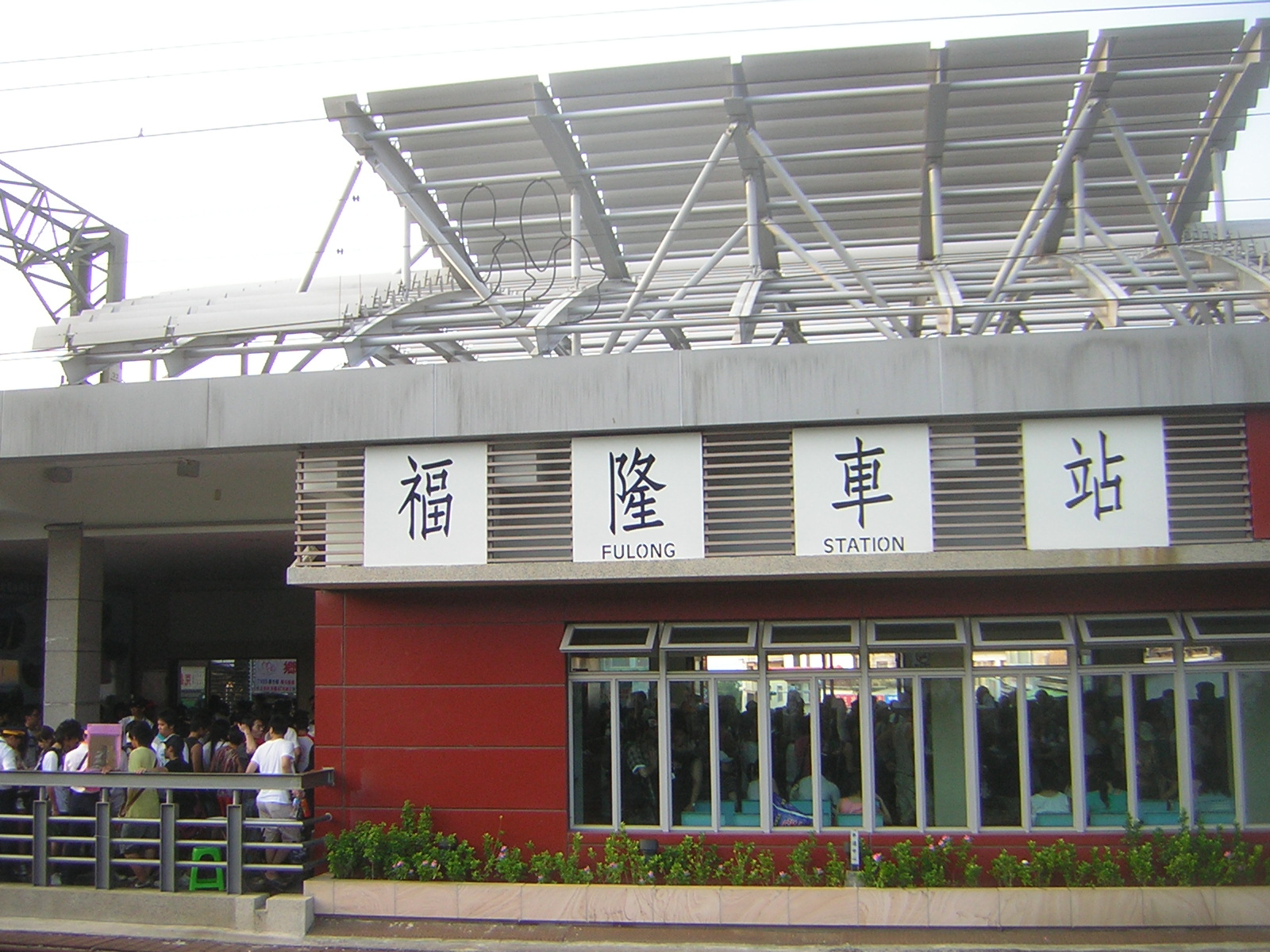
People going for Hohaiyan Rock Festival at Fulong Station.

The concert venue is accessible within walking distance from Taiwan Railway Fulong Station.

== See also ==
- Fulong Beach
- Music of Taiwan
- Culture of Taiwan
- List of music festivals in Taiwan
