= Gongliao railway station =

Railway station in Gongliao, New Taipei, Taiwan

Gongliao Station 貢寮車站
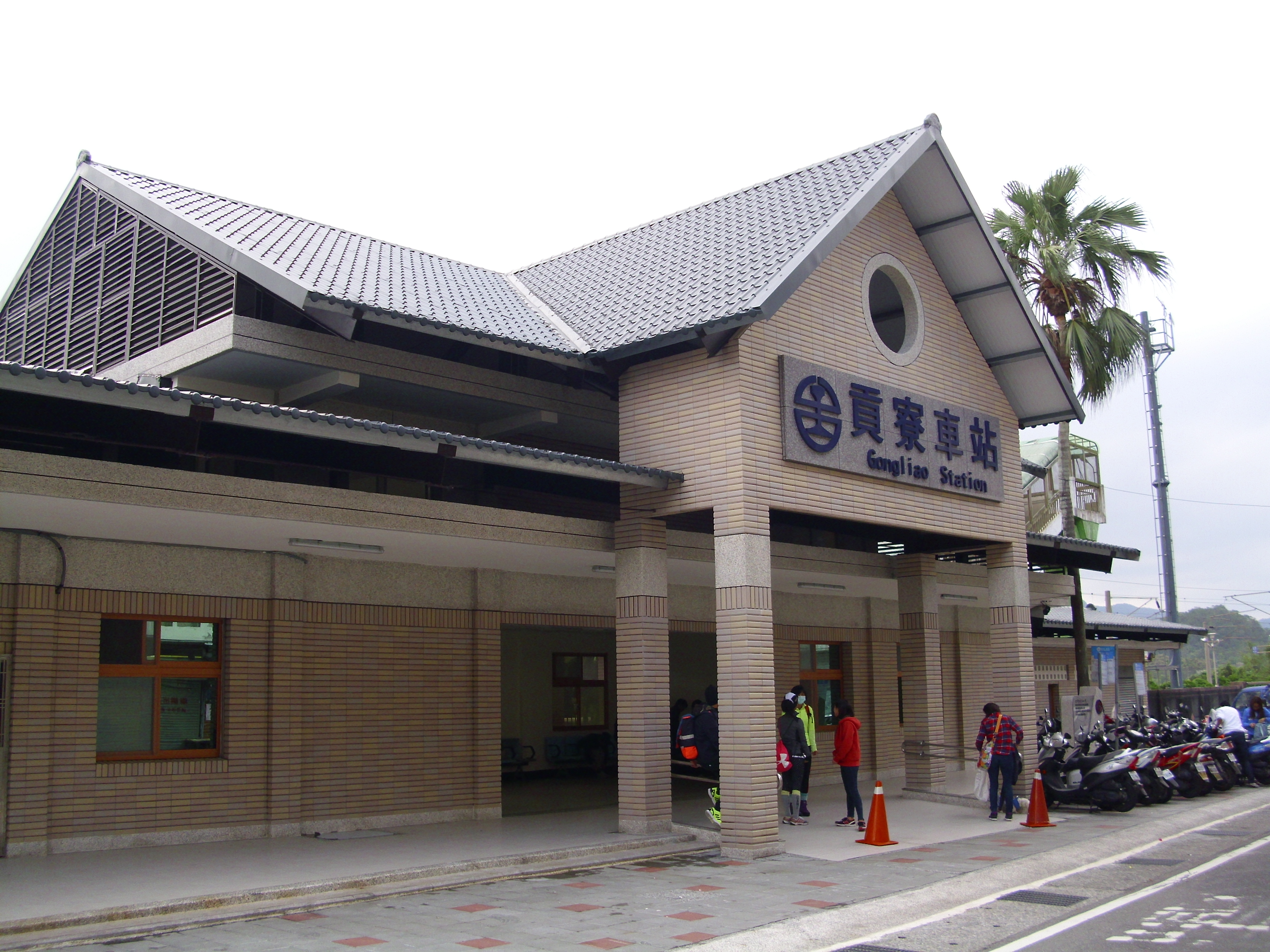

General information
- Location: Gongliao, New Taipei, Taiwan
- Coordinates: 25°01′19.4″N 121°54′31.2″E
- System: Train station
- Owner: Taiwan Railway Corporation
- Operator: Taiwan Railway Corporation
- Line: Eastern Trunk line
- Train operators: Taiwan Railway Corporation

History
- Opened: 30 November 1924

Passengers
- 351 daily (2024)

Services
Preceding station	Taiwan Railway	Following station
Shuangxi towards Badu	Eastern Trunk line	Fulong towards Taitung
Location

Gongliao (Chinese: 貢寮車站; pinyin: Gòngliáo Chēzhàn) is a railway station on Taiwan Railway Yilan line. It is located in Gongliao District, New Taipei, Taiwan.

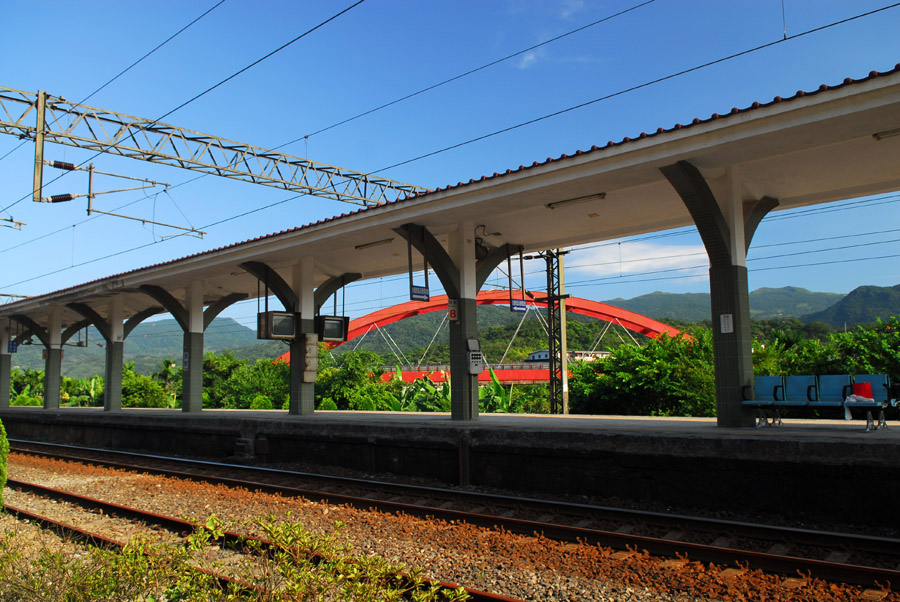
Gongliao station platform

== History ==
The station was opened on 30 November 1924.

== See also ==
- List of railway stations in Taiwan
