= Turtle Mountain =

Turtle Mountain or Turtle Mountains may refer to:

- Turtle Mountain in Alberta, Canada
- Turtle Mountain in Shanxi, China
- Turtle Mountain (electoral district), a provincial electoral division in the Canadian province of Manitoba
- Turtle Mountain (plateau), a mountainous area in the Canadian province of Manitoba and the U.S. state of North Dakota
- Turtle Mountain Band of Chippewa Indians, a Native American tribe of Ojibwa and Métis peoples
- Turtle Mountain College, a tribal college in Belcourt, North Dakota
- Turtle Mountain Indian Reservation, an Indian Reservation located primarily in northern North Dakota
- Turtle Mountain Provincial Park, a provincial park located in the southwestern portion of the Canadian province of Manitoba
- Turtle Mountains (California), a mountain range of the Lower Colorado River Valley
- Turtle Mountain on Guishan Island (Turtle Island), an island off the northeast coast of Taiwan
