= Old Caoling Tunnel =

Tunnel in Gongliao, New Taipei, Taiwan

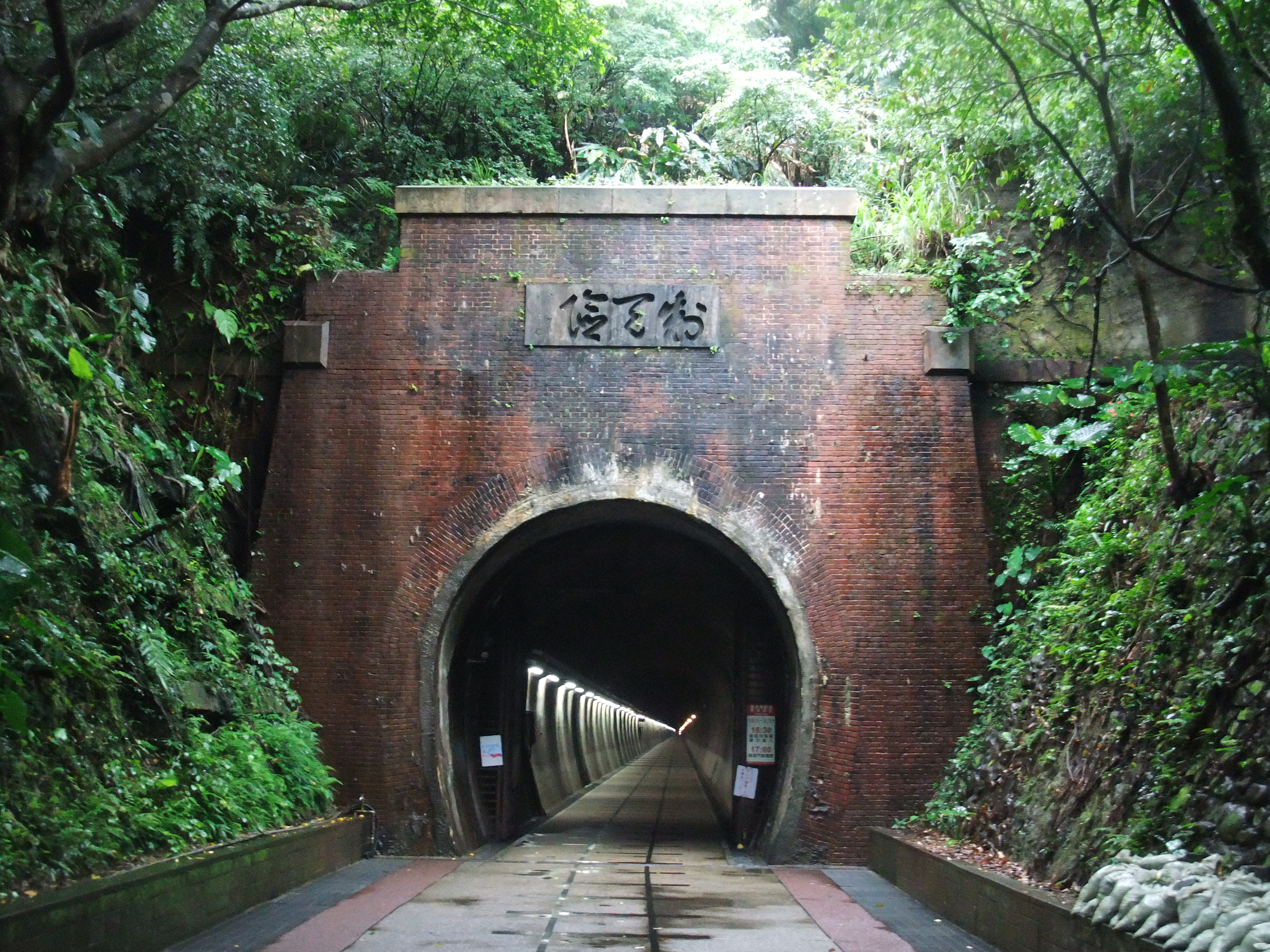
- Interactive map of Old Caoling Tunnel

Overview
- Official name: 舊草嶺隧道
- Location: Gongliao, New Taipei, Taiwan
- Coordinates: 25°00′14.2″N 121°57′30.0″E
- Status: Heritage

Operation
- Opened: February 1924 (as railway tunnel); 10 August 2009 (as bikeway)

Technical
- Length: 2.167 km (1.347 mi)

The Old Caoling Tunnel (traditional Chinese: 舊草嶺隧道; simplified Chinese: 旧草岭隧道; pinyin: Jiù Cǎolǐng Suìdào) is a cycleway tunnel in Gongliao District, New Taipei, Taiwan.

== History ==
The tunnel was originally constructed as a single-track railway tunnel of Yilan line which was inaugurated in February 1924. It was then later on converted into a cycleway when the new railway tunnel was constructed in parallel with the old one. The new tunnel was opened in 1986 and the old tunnel was abandoned. Years later, the tunnel was turned into a bikeway by Northeast Coast and Yilan National Scenic Area Administration. The tunnel was then reopened on 10 August 2009.

== Architecture ==
The cycleway path inside the tunnel was designed in a style of a track. The tunnel was originally lit with oil lamps and now is lit with fluorescent strip lights and a few low energy bulbs in replica lanterns 2020. The entrance features some artworks. The tunnel stretches for a length of 2.167 km.

== Transportation ==
The tunnel is accessible by bus from Fulong Station of Taiwan Railway.

== See also ==
- List of tourist attractions in Taiwan
