= Fulong railway station =

Railway station in New Taipei, Taiwan

Fulong Station 福隆車站
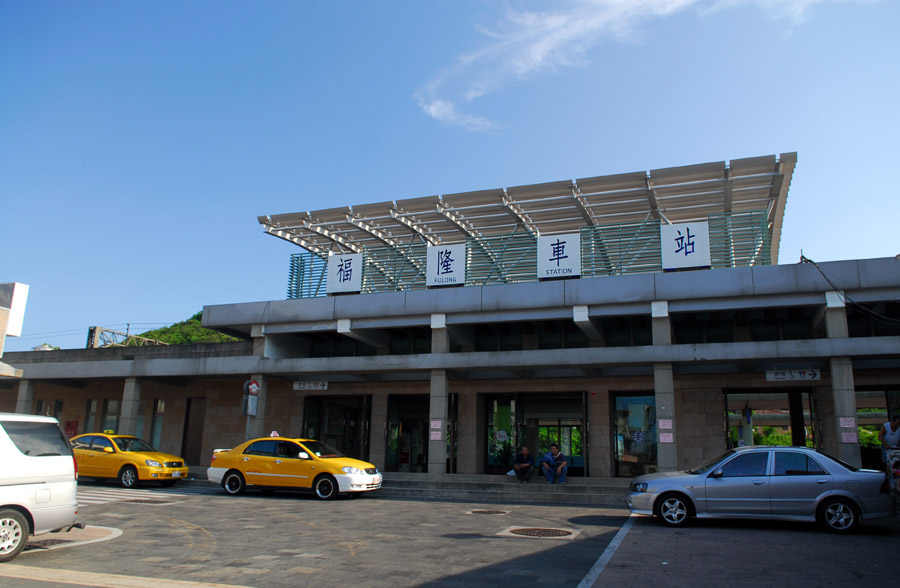

General information
- Location: Gongliao, New Taipei, Taiwan
- Coordinates: 25°00′57.4″N 121°56′41.5″E
- System: Train station
- Owner: Taiwan Railway Corporation
- Operator: Taiwan Railway Corporation
- Line: Yilan
- Train operators: Taiwan Railway Corporation

History
- Opened: 30 November 1924

Passengers
- 2,174 daily (2024)

Services
Preceding station	Taiwan Railway	Following station
Gongliao towards Badu	Eastern Trunk line	Shicheng towards Taitung
Location

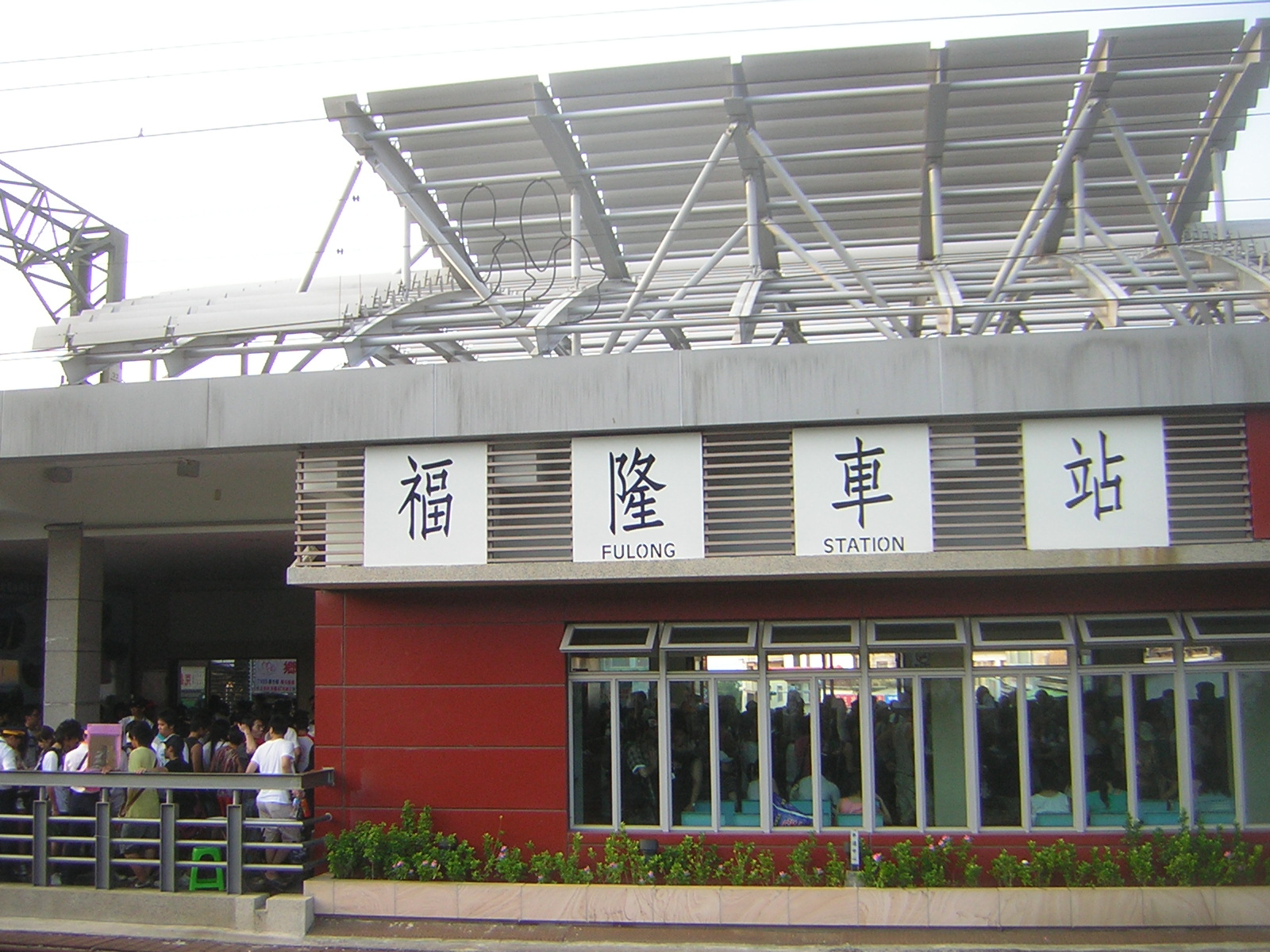
TRA Fulong Station. In this photograph, people are joining Hohaiyan Rock Festival in 2006.

Fulong (Chinese: 福隆車站; pinyin: Fúlóng Chēzhàn) is a Taiwan Railway Yilan line station, located at Fulong Village, Gongliao District, New Taipei, Taiwan.

== Structure ==
- Two island platforms

== Service ==
As of 2013, this is classified as a third-class station by TRA standards.

== History ==
- Original station name was Washi (控子) in Japanese during construction, but the correct character is 挖子.
- On 30 November 1924, the station was opened under the name Okutei (澳底; Pe̍h-ōe-jī: Ò-té), which is a fishing port located 6 km north to this station.
- On 1 December 1952, the station name was changed to the current name.
- On 25 July 2005, reconstruction of the station's main structure was finished. This reconstruction was managed by the Northeast Coast National Scenic Area Administration, and sponsored by Taipower Company. The name board of the station is written in the imitation Song typeface, which is unique among TRA stations.

== Nearby landmarks ==
- Fulong Beach
- Northeast Coast National Scenic Area
- Longmen Nuclear Power Plant
- Old Caoling Tunnel

== See also ==
- List of railway stations in Taiwan
