= Shuang River =

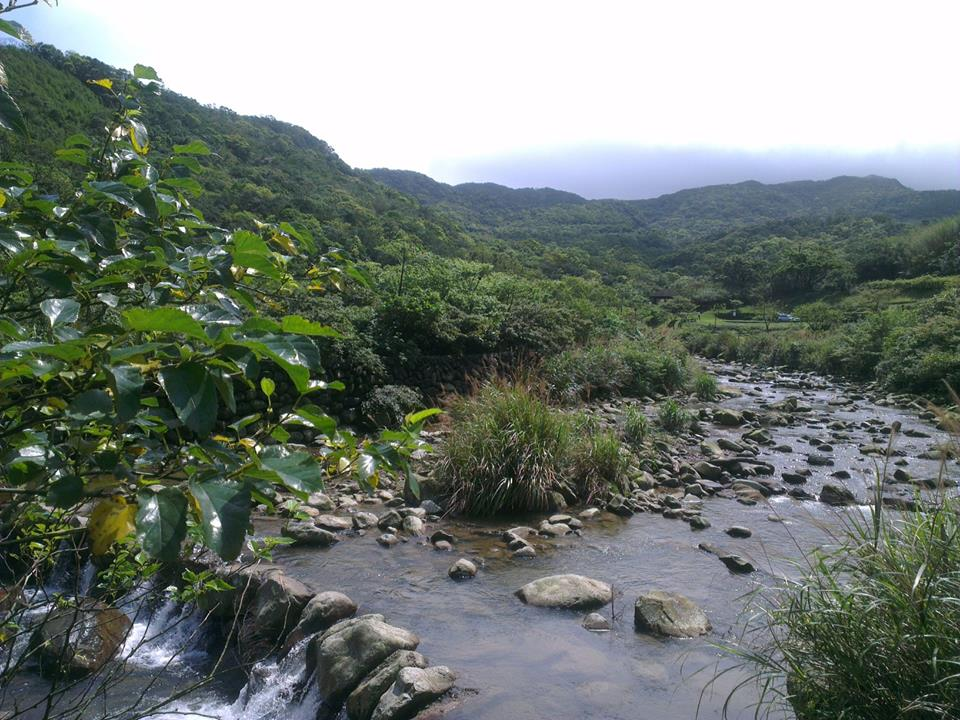
- A tributary of the Shuang River

- Shuang River in Taiwan

Location
- Country: Taiwan

Physical characteristics
- Source
  - location: Xueshan Range: Shuangxi District
- Mouth
  - location: Pacific Ocean: Fulong Beach, New Taipei City
  - coordinates: 25.020°N 121.947°E
- Length: 26.81 km (16.66 mi)
- Basin size: 132.50 km^{2} (51.16 sq mi)
- Discharge
  - maximum: 1,830 m^{3}/s (65,000 cu ft/s)

The Shuang River (Chinese: 雙溪; pinyin: Shuāng Xī; Pe̍h-ōe-jī: Siang-khoe; lit. 'Double Creek') is a river in Taiwan. It flows through the eponymous Shuangxi District and Gongliao District in eastern New Taipei City for 27 km. Fulong Beach, one of the more popular beach destinations in northern Taiwan, is located at the mouth of the Shuang River.

== See also ==
- List of rivers in Taiwan
