= Tortuga Island (disambiguation) =

Tortuga, or Tortuga Island, is a Caribbean island that forms part of Haiti.

Tortuga, Tortuga Isle, or Tortuga Island may refer to:

- La Tortuga Island, Venezuela, an uninhabited island in the Caribbean Sea
- Tortuga Island, Baja California Sur, Mexico, a volcanic island in the Gulf of California
- Tortuga Island, Peru, a small island in Department of Ancash, Peru
- Dry Tortugas, a group of islands in the Florida Keys in the United States
  - Dry Tortugas National Park, a national park consisting of Fort Jefferson and the Dry Tortugas
- Isla Tortuguero, an island in Costa Rica
- La Tortue, Saint Barthélemy, a small island in the French Caribbean
- Tortuga Isle, a safe haven for fugitive pirates, featured prominently in Pirates of the Caribbean: The Curse of the Black Pearl (2003)
- Las Tortugas, the name given by Christopher Columbus to Little Cayman and Cayman Brac

== See also ==
- Tortuga (disambiguation)
- Turtle Island (disambiguation)
