= Yanliao Beach Park =

Beach in Gongliao, New Taipei, Taiwan

Yanliao Beach Park 鹽寮海濱公園
- beach
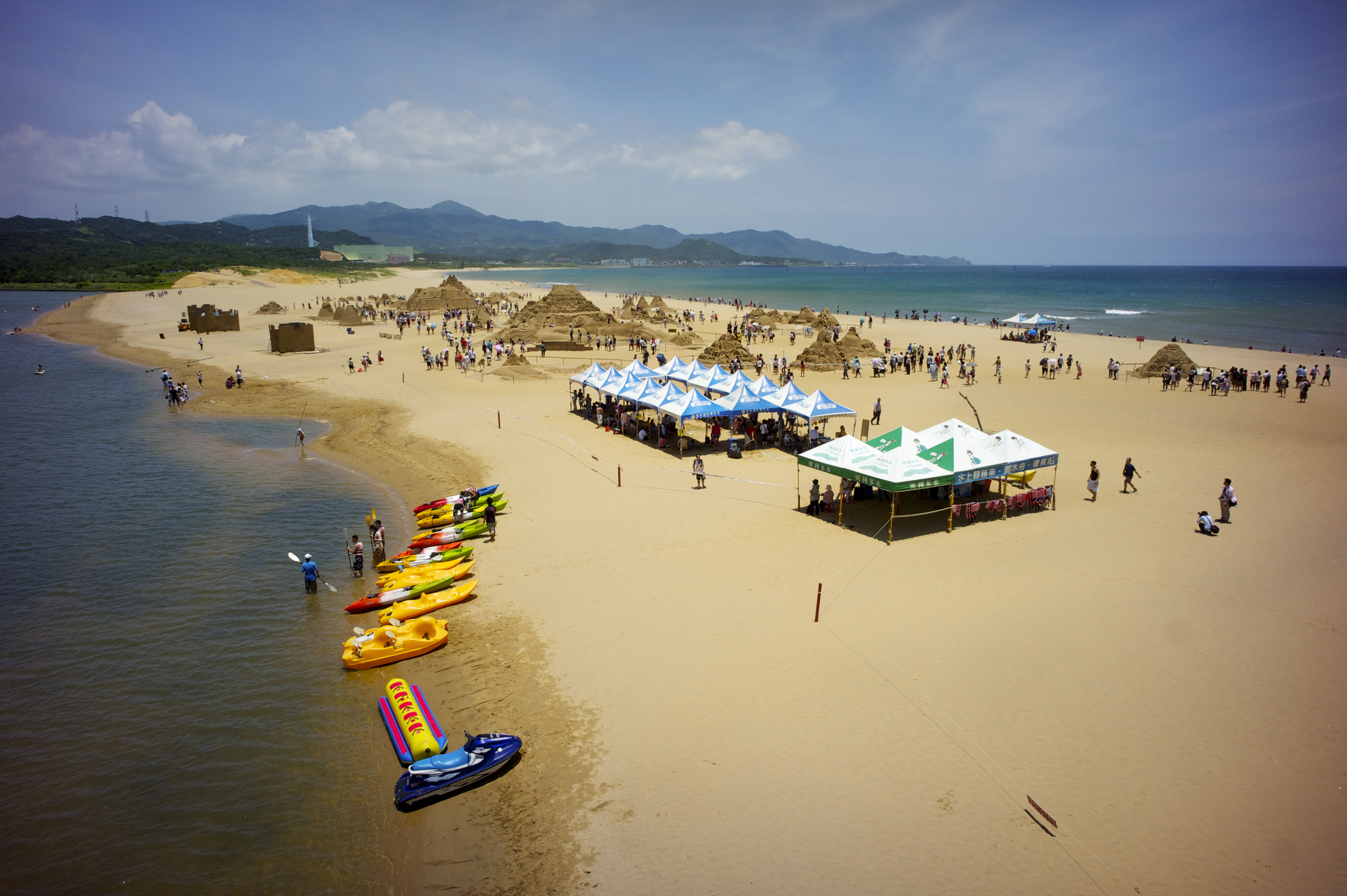

- Taiwan
- Coordinates: 25°02′31.2″N 121°55′38.2″E
- Location: Gongliao, New Taipei, Taiwan

Dimensions
  - Length: 3 km
- Access: Keelung Station

The Yanliao Beach Park (traditional Chinese: 鹽寮海濱公園; simplified Chinese: 盐寮海滨公园; pinyin: Yánliáo Hǎibīn Gōngyuán) is a beach in Gongliao District, New Taipei, Taiwan.

== Geography ==
The beach spans up to 80 hectares, making it the largest recreational area in northeast coast of Taiwan. Its golden sand beach stretches 3 km all the way to Fulong Beach, the longest beach stretch in the island. The beach is an ideal place for swimming, fishing, sand sculpture and beach volleyball.

== Facilities ==
The beach has scenery balcony, tour tracks, public restrooms, parking spaces, shower rooms and simple food courts.

== Transportation ==
The beach is accessible by bus from Keelung Station of Taiwan Railway.

== See also ==
- List of tourist attractions in Taiwan
