= Honeymoon Bay, Yilan =

Bay in Yilan, Taiwan

Honeymoon Bay 蜜月灣
- Beach
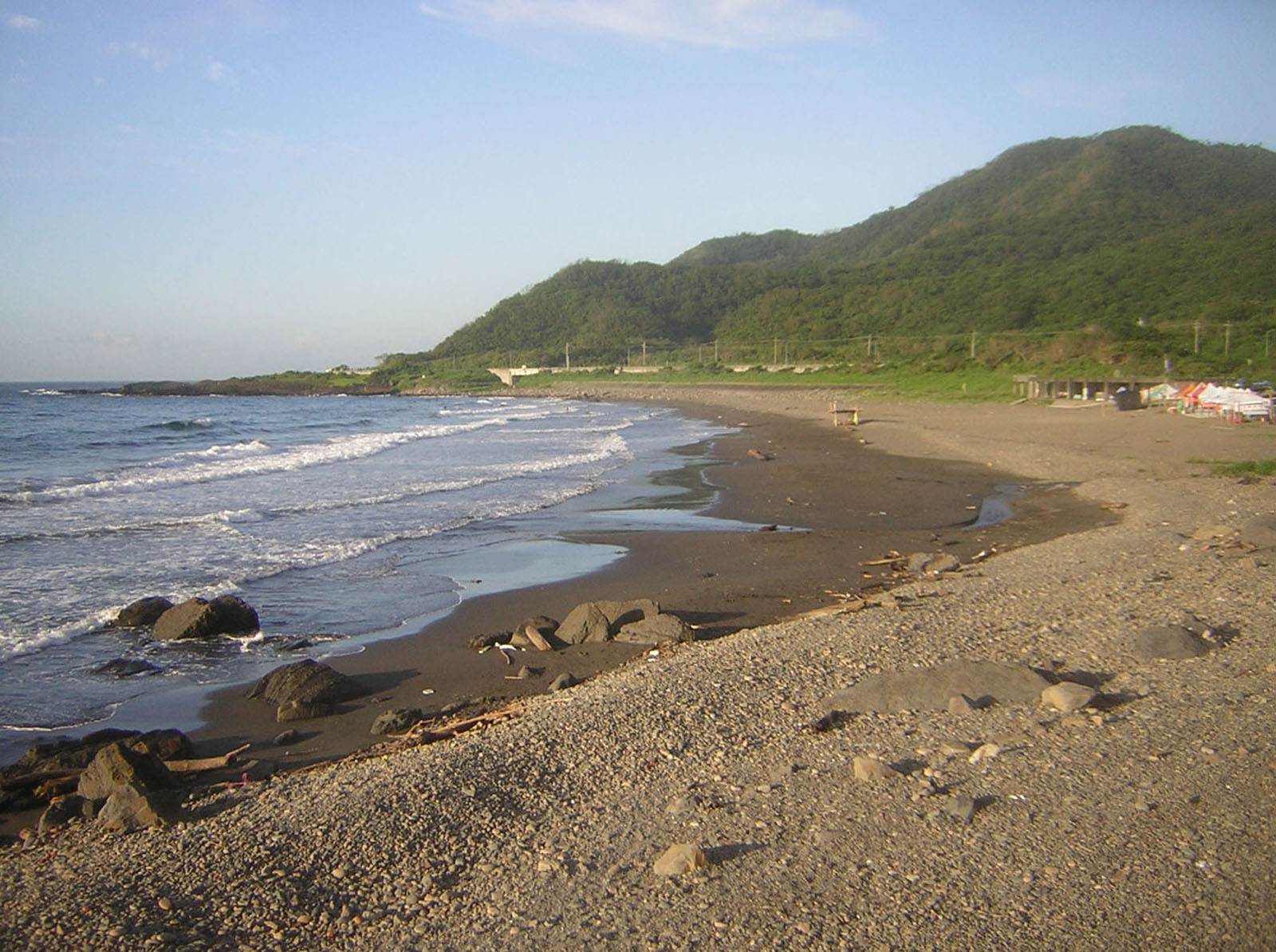

- Location within Taiwan
- Coordinates: 24.9329°N 121.8858°E
- Location: Toucheng, Yilan County, Taiwan
- Access: Daxi Station

Honeymoon Bay (Chinese: 蜜月灣; pinyin: Mìyuè Wān) is a small bay facing the Pacific Ocean, located at the northeast coast of Taiwan in Toucheng Township, Yilan County. Southeast of the bay is Guishan Island, famous to Taiwanese people. Recently, this bay became popular among Taiwanese and foreign surfers. It can be reached by taking the train to nearby Daxi Station of the Taiwan Railway and then walking for about 10 minutes.

== Geography and activities ==
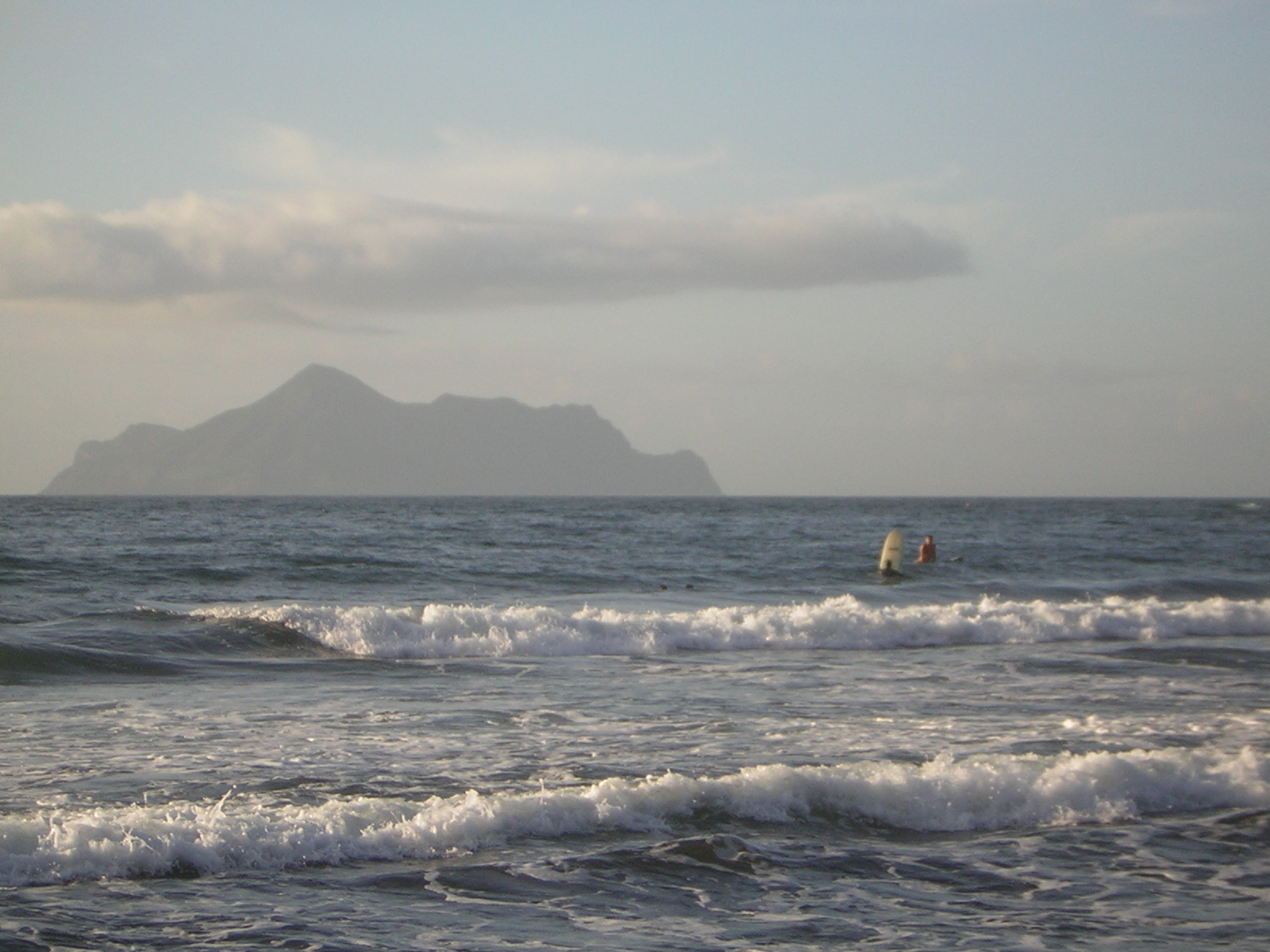
Surfers at Honeymoon Bay in a summer morning. Far away is the Gueishan Island.

The bay has the shape of a half Moon. The northern and southern shores of the bay are rocky, while in between there is a beach covered with fine, dark-gray sand.

Several hundred meters from the seashore, the undersea topography varies a lot, causing waves 2 to 3 meters high. Such waves hit the bay repeatedly, making surfing a common activity here. There are also several stalls for teaching surfing.

The beach is a good place for non-surfing activities, such as beach volleyball. However, it suffers from a littering problem.

There were some minor music festivals in summer here during the past few years.

== Nearby landmarks ==
- Hexing (Gallant) Village (a.k.a. Hexing Community) 合興富麗農漁村(合興社區)
- Daxi Elementary School of Toucheng Township, Yilan County, Taiwan 宜蘭縣頭城鎮大溪國小
- Daxi Station 大溪車站
