= Tortuga (vehicle) =

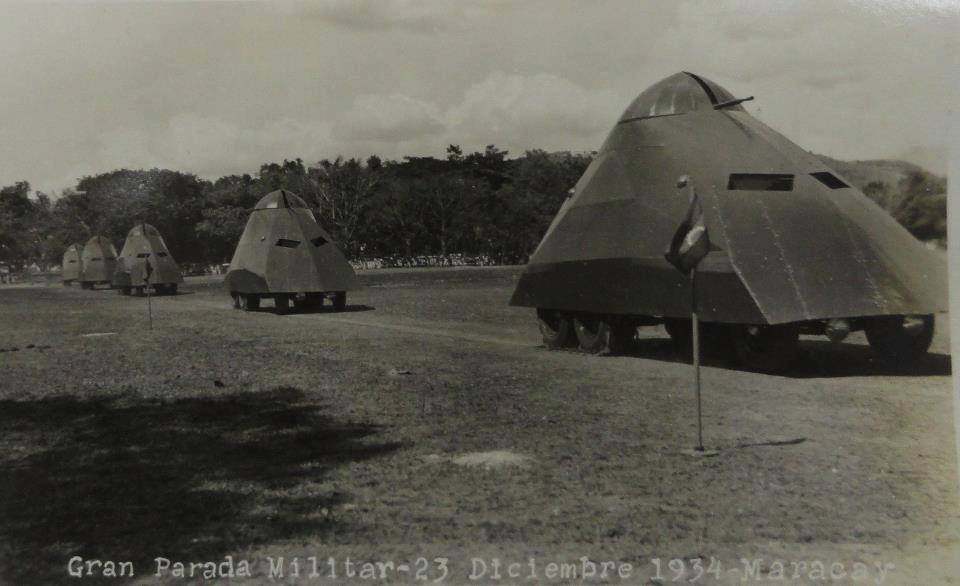
- Military parade of tortugas in Maracas, 1934
- Type: Armored car
- Place of origin: Venezuela

Production history
- Designer: Tomás Pacanins
- Designed: 1934
- No. built: 7

Specifications
- Main armament: 7mm Mark 4B machine gun 456 rounds
- Suspension: 6x4 wheel

The Tortuga (Spanish for Turtle) was an armored vehicle designed and built in Venezuela in 1934, during the rule of Juan Vicente Gómez. It was assembled at the Puerto Cabello shipyard by Engineer Tomás Pacanins. First displayed at a military parade in the city of Maracay, the vehicle's existence was meant to send a clear message to neighboring Colombia - which had created several border and political incidents since its victory over Peru in the Leticia Incident - as was the whole parade. On December 23, 1934, the Tortuga was first revealed to the public, in conjunction with two Italian Ansaldo CV 33 infantry tanks.

== Characteristics ==
In his "Historia de la Artillería" (History of Artillery), Lieutenant Pedro Arturo Omaña describes the Tortuga: "It was a very flashy armored car - whose external shell gave it a shape similar to a London policeman's hat - but it was hard to manoeuver, with a nearly null ventilation system and nearly null visibility"

Its shell was mounted on a 6x4 Ford 1934 truck. Its rear wheels were linked by treads, making it a half-tracked vehicle, its designation within the Army being "Semi-treaded Armored Recon Vehicle". It was armed with a Mark 4B 7 mm machine gun (.303 cal) installed in a dome-shaped rotating turret located on the upper part of the shell.
