= Manzhou Beach =

Beach in Manzhou, Pingtung County, Taiwan

Manzhou Beach 滿州海灘
- Beach
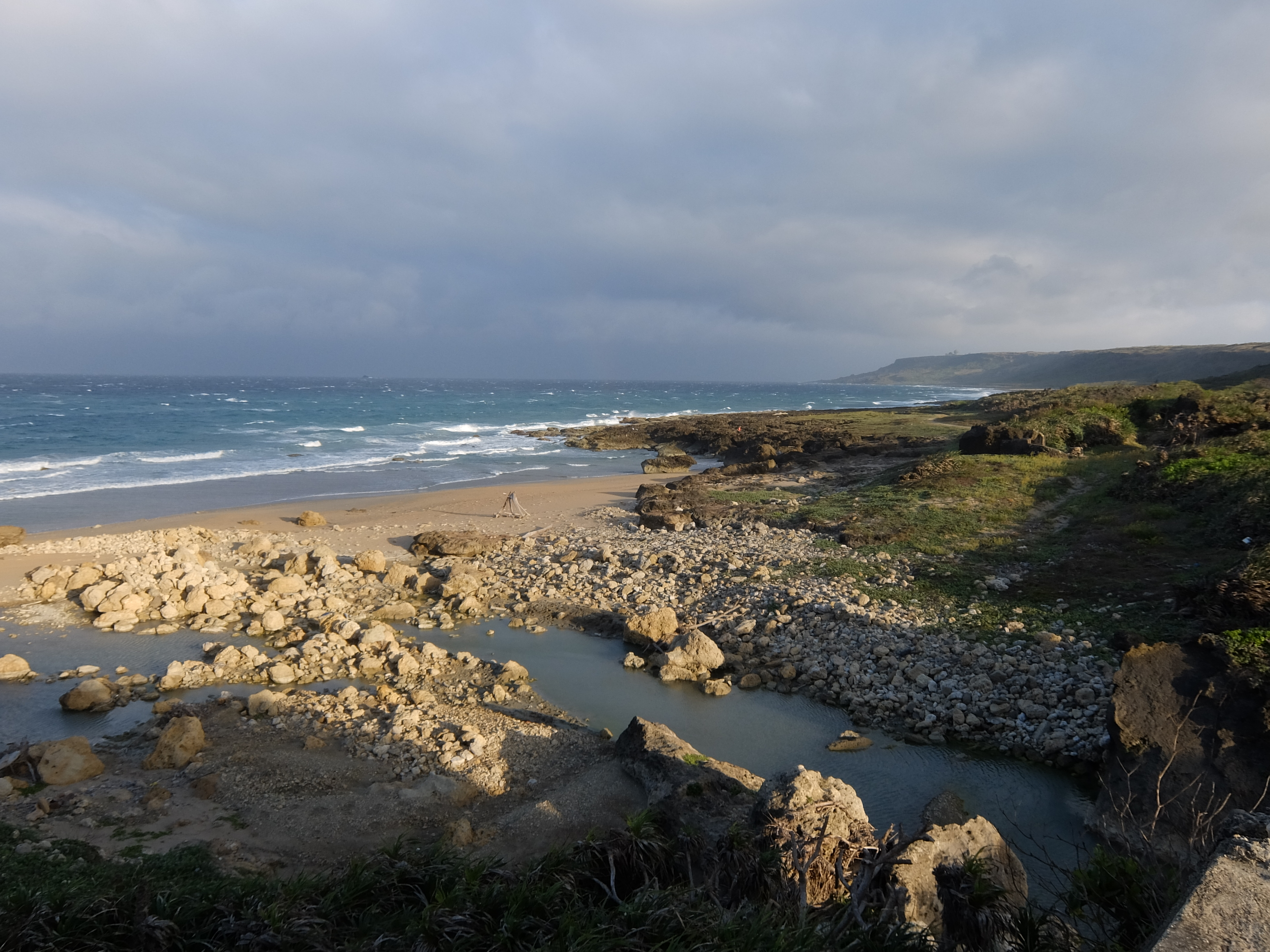

- Coordinates: 21°57′28.6″N 120°50′25.0″E
- Location: Hengchun Township, Pingtung County, Taiwan
- Part of: Kenting National Park
- Geology: beach

The Manzhou Beach (traditional Chinese: 滿州海灘; simplified Chinese: 满州海滩; pinyin: Mǎnzhōu Hǎitān) is a beach in Kenting National Park, Hengchun Township, Pingtung County, Taiwan.

== Architecture ==
The parking lot for the beach features a white pillar.

== Activities ==
The beach is a place for people to go surfing.

== See also ==
- List of tourist attractions in Taiwan
