= Turtle Island (cookbook) =

2025 cookbook by Sean Sherman

- Author: Sean Sherman
- Genre: Cookbook
- Publisher: Clarkson Potter
- Publication date: 2025

Turtle Island: Foods and Traditions of the Indigenous Peoples of North America is a cookbook by Sean Sherman, published by Clarkson Potter in 2025.

== Background ==
The book was co-authored with cookbook writer Kristin Donnelly and journalist Kate Nelson. While preparing the book, Nelson traveled throughout North America to learn about different indigenous culinary traditions. It includes recipes for the indigenous cuisine of North America, based on plants and animals indigenous to the continent. It is divided into thirteen chapters, which deal with cuisine from different regions. The book covers food from Canada, the United States, and Mexico with an emphasis on seasonal produce, game meat, and other foraged ingredients that grow natively in North America such as corn and elk. Foods introduced after colonization, like pork and wheat, are excluded.

== Reception ==
The book was given a starred review in Library Journal, with Jocelyn Castillo calling it "an in-depth primer on Indigenous foodways". It was named one of the ten best books about food of 2025 in Smithsonian.
