= Gongliao District =

District in New Taipei, Taiwan

Gongliao 貢寮區 Kōryō
- District
- Gongliao District
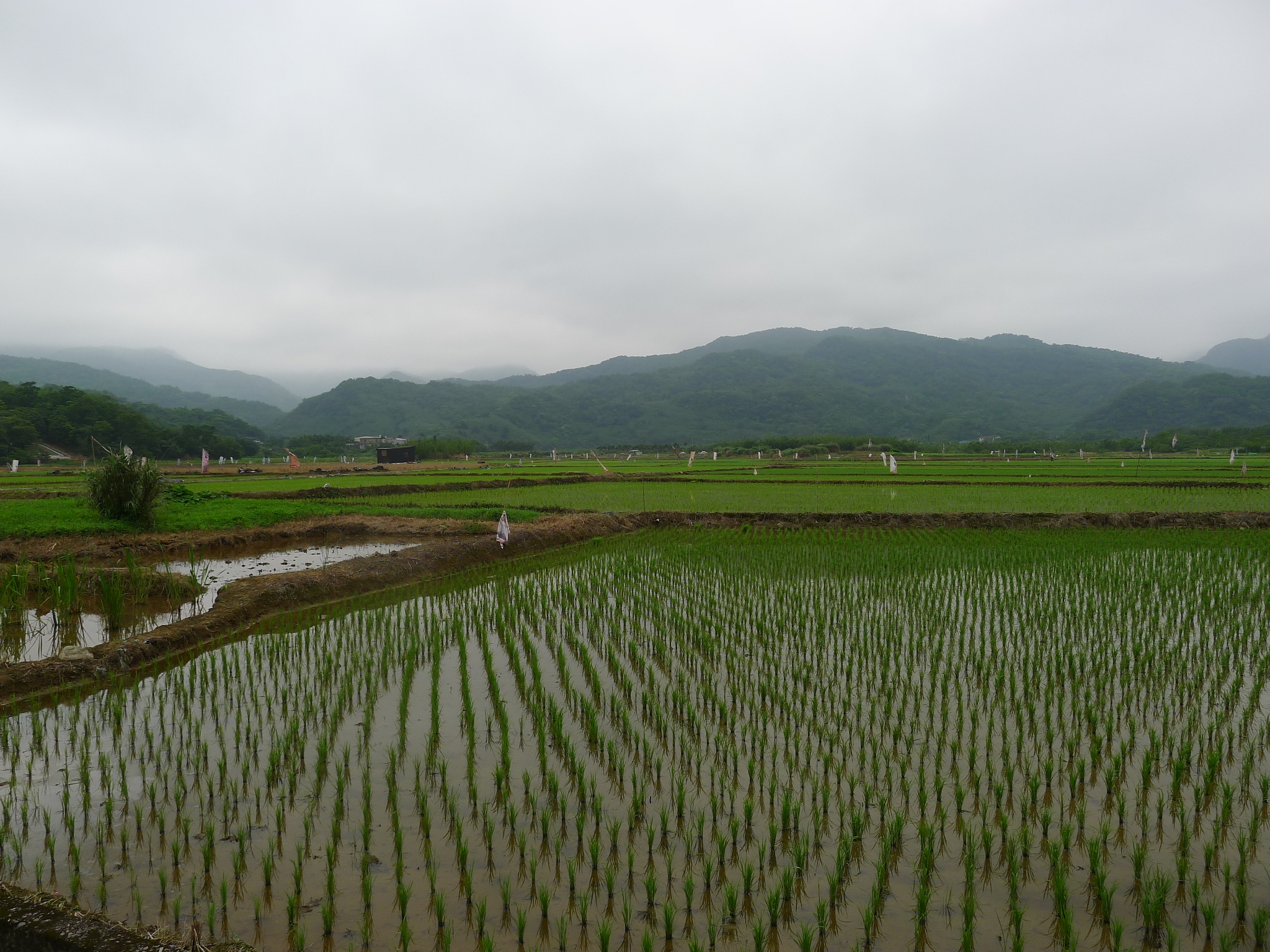
- Farmland and hills in Gongliao District

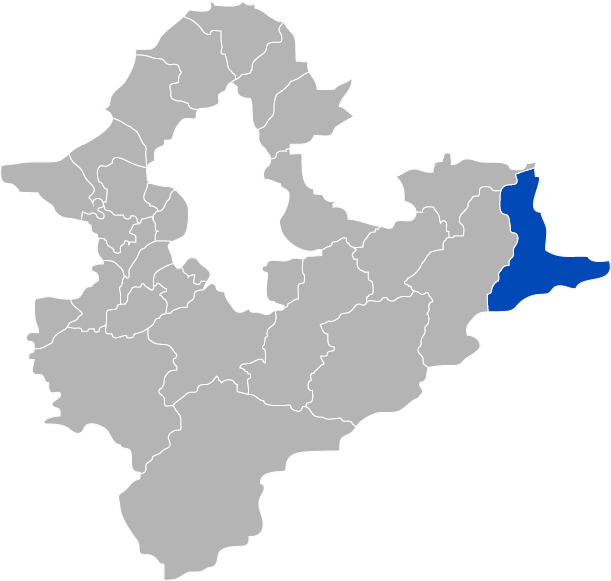
- Gongliao District in New Taipei City
- Coordinates: 25°1′19″N 121°54′36″E
- Country: Republic of China (Taiwan)
- Special municipality: New Taipei City

Area
  - Total: 38.60 sq mi (99.97 km^{2})

Population (March 2023)
  - Total: 11,177
- Time zone: +8
- Website: www.gongliao.ntpc.gov.tw (in Chinese)

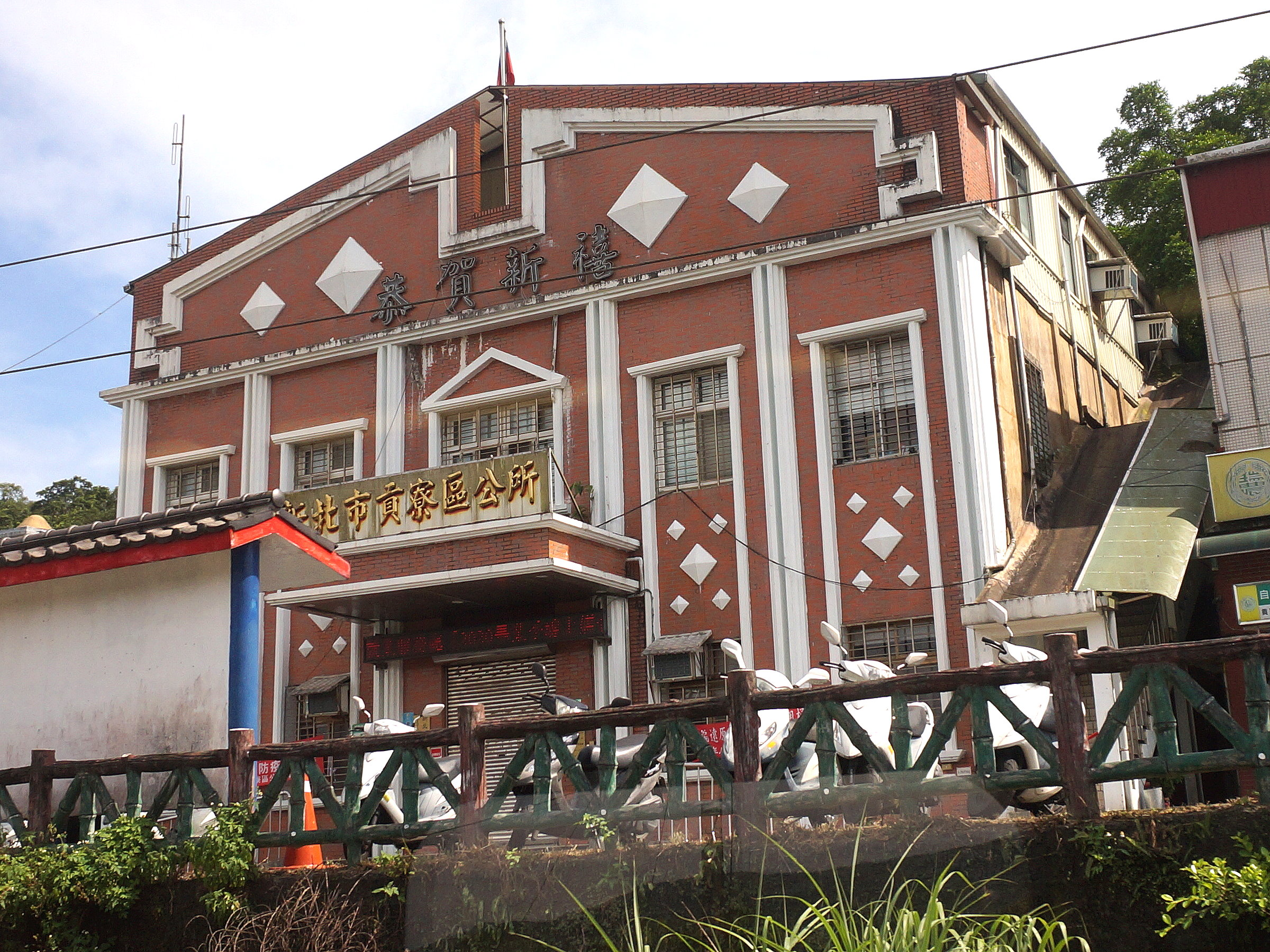
Gongliao District Office

Gongliao District (Chinese: 貢寮區; pinyin: Gòngliáo Qū; Pe̍h-ōe-jī: Kòng-liâu-khu; originally Chinese: 摃仔寮; Pe̍h-ōe-jī: Kòng-á-liâu) is a rural district in the eastern part of New Taipei City, Taiwan. It is the easternmost district on the main island of Taiwan and at its easternmost tip is Cape Santiago.

== History ==
During the period of Japanese rule, Gongliao was called Kōryō Village (貢寮庄), and was administered under Kīrun District, Taihoku Prefecture.

== Geography ==
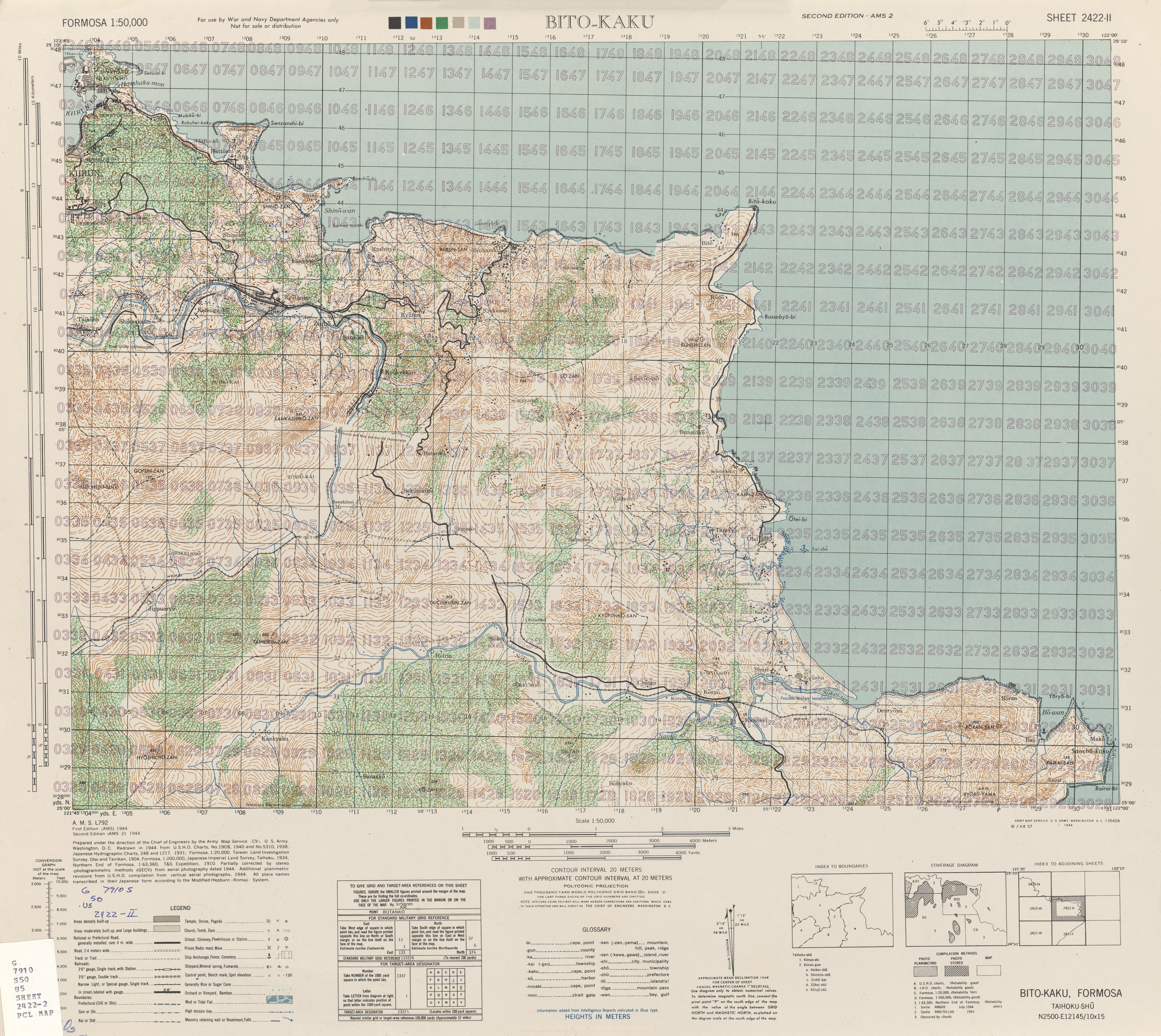
Map including Gongliao (labeled as Kōryō) (1944)

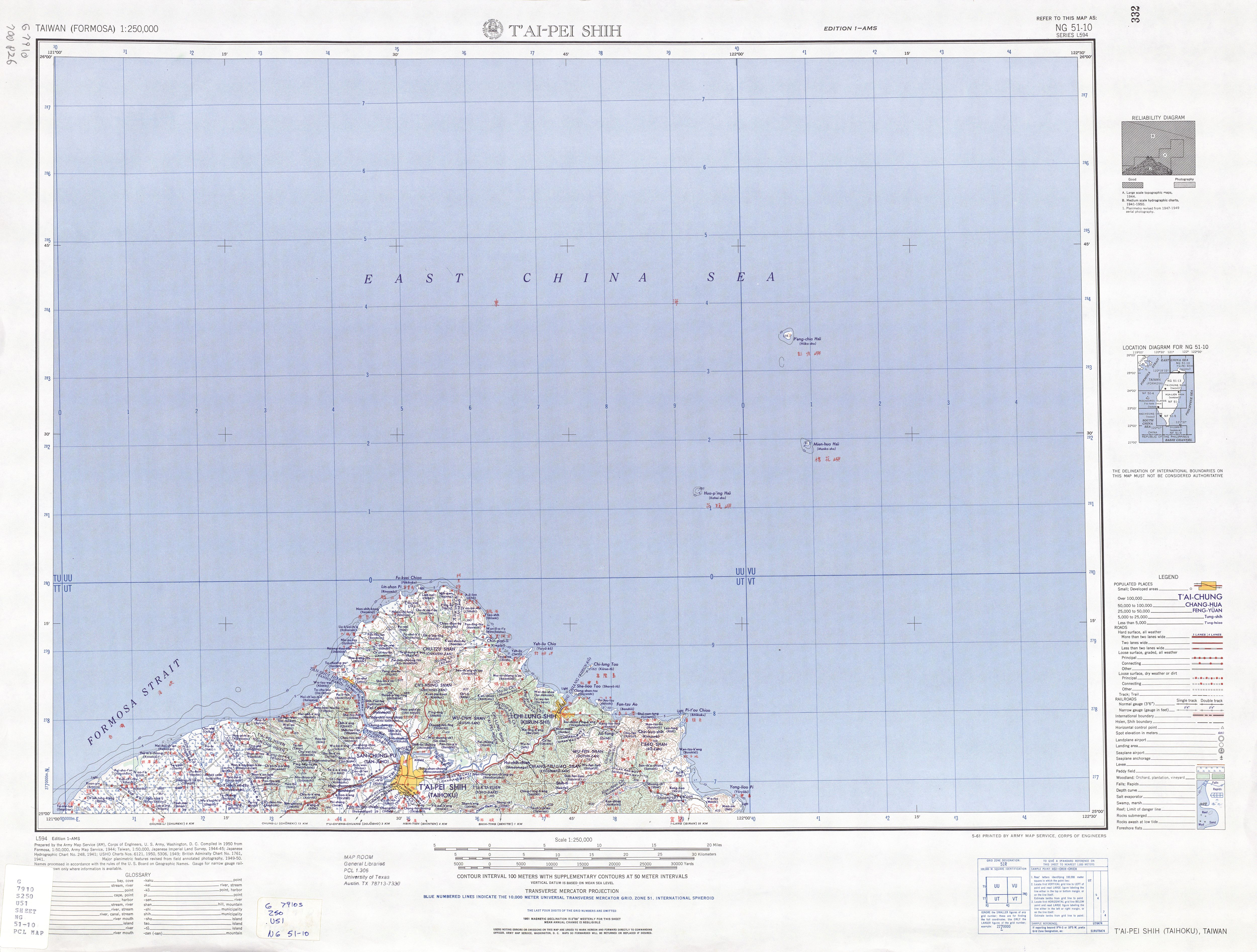
Map including Gongliao (labeled as Kung-liao (Kōryō)) (1950)

The area of the district is approximately 99.97 square kilometers. There are about 11,177 people living in the district.

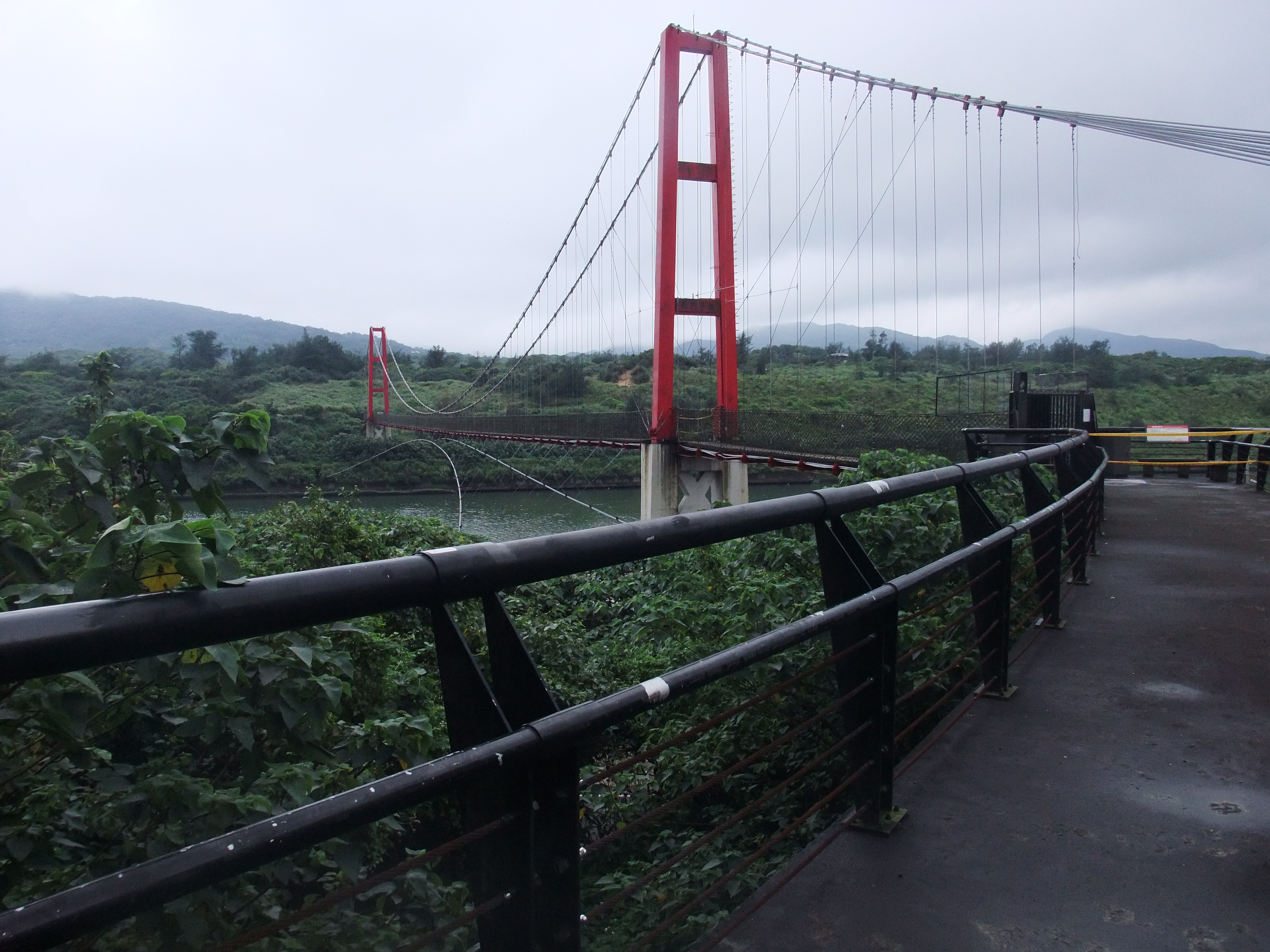
Bike trail in Gongliao District

== Tourist attractions ==
Fulong Beach and Hohaiyan Rock Festival. Fulong Beach, also known as Fulong Bathing Beach (福隆海水浴場), is located at Fulong Village, Gongliao District, New Taipei City at Northeastern Taiwan. It is the outlet of the Shuang River.

The sands there are golden, which is rare in Taiwan. Nearby is a camping site named Longmen. This beach is a favorite in the summer for people living in northern Taiwan. It is also a popular area for surfing, windsurfing, and fishing.

The Shuang River divides the beach into inner and outer parts. There is a footbridge named Rainbow Bridge (彩虹橋) linking the two parts. However, the watercourse of the river varies every year to some extent; sometimes the bridge is functional; other times it is not, because the seaside end would be in the river or in the sea.

Since 2000, the Hohaiyan Rock Festival (貢寮國際海洋音樂祭) has been held here for 3 to 5 days in the summer. Normally, it takes place in mid-July, but sometimes it has been delayed due to typhoon interruption or damage to the band shell facilities. Also the watercourse of the Shuang River sometimes changes shape or size, influencing the location of these temporary band shells.

- Aodi (sometimes Audi, Aoti, Auti; Chinese: 澳底) is a fishing village in Gongliao. It is a popular tourist destination owing to its scenic setting and many seafood restaurants. It is also close to the controversial Lungmen Nuclear Power Plant, under construction since 1999. A nearby beach, Yenliao (鹽寮), was the site of the first landing for the Japanese invasion of Taiwan in 1895.
- Yanliao Beach Park
- Cape Santiago Lighthouse at the Cape Santiago
- Old Caoling Tunnel

== Infrastructure ==
Taiwan's fourth nuclear power plant is under construction in Gongliao. Construction of the plant is opposed by most of the community's residents.

== Transportation ==
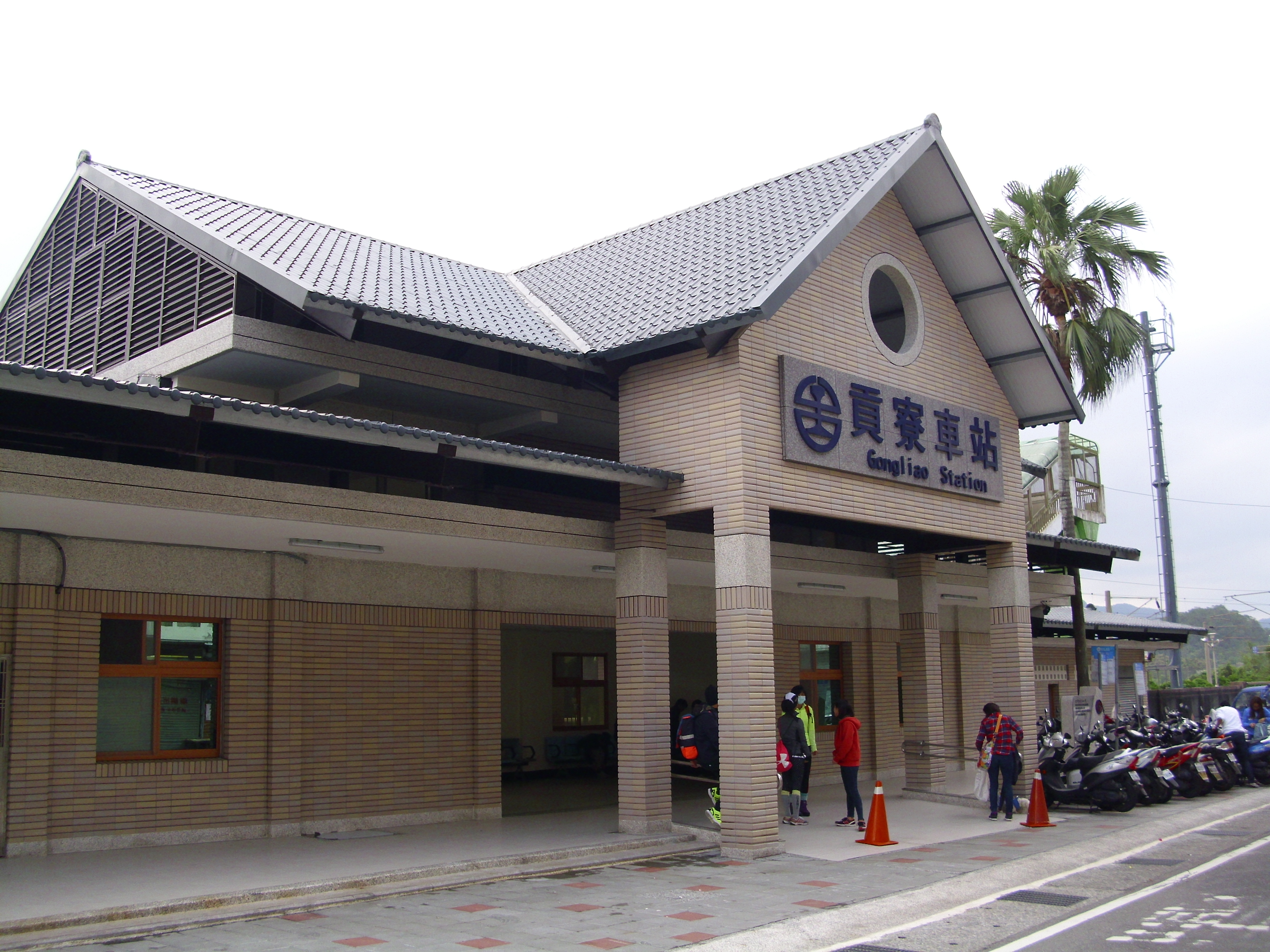
TRA Gongliao Station

- TR Fulong Station
- TR Gongliao Station

== Notable natives ==
- Puff Kuo, model, actress and singer

== See also ==
- New Taipei City
- List of Taiwanese superlatives
