= Fulong Beach =

Beach in Gongliao, New Taipei, Taiwan

Fulong Beach 福隆海水浴場
- Beach
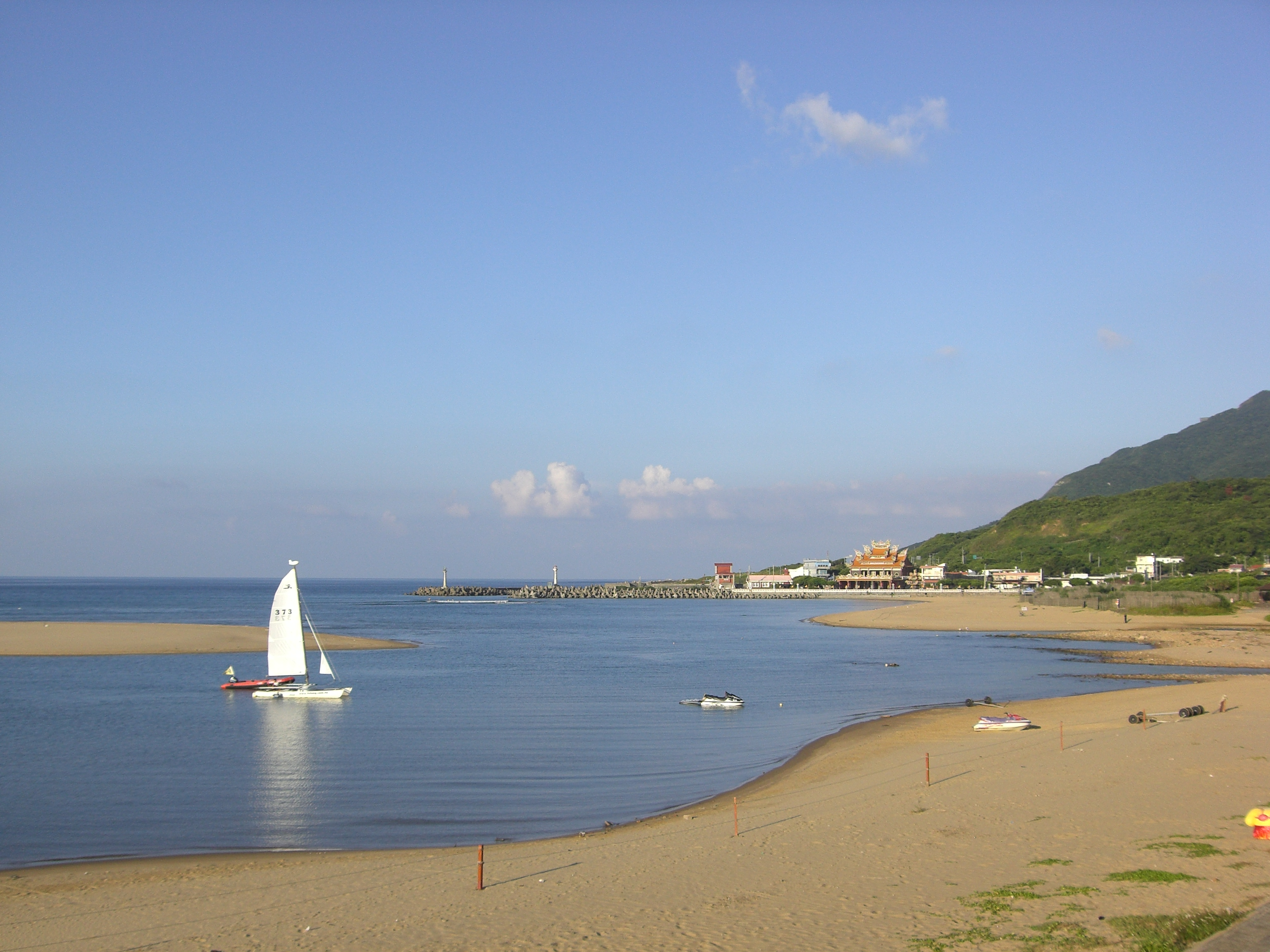
- Picture of Fulong Beach

- Location within Taiwan
- Coordinates: 25°1′15″N 121°56′43″E
- Location: Gongliao, New Taipei, Taiwan
- Patrolled by: Northeast and Yilan Coast National Scenic Area Administration
- Access: Fulong Station

Fulong Beach, also known as Fulong Bathing Beach (Chinese: 福隆海水浴場; pinyin: Fúlóng Hǎishuǐ Yùchǎng), is located at Fulong Village, Gongliao District, New Taipei, Taiwan. It is the outlet of the Shuang River.

== History ==
The beach was opened to the public on 22 June 1975. The resort at the beach was initially operated by Taiwan Railways Administration and was later transferred to the Northeast and Yilan Coast National Scenic Area Administration of Tourism Bureau.

== Geology ==
The beach's sands are golden, which is rare in Taiwan. The Shuang River divides the beach into inner and outer parts. Recently the sands have been diminishing year by year, and the coastline is moving shoreward; i.e., the beach is shrinking, possibly related to the staithe built for the Fourth Nuclear Power Plant of Taiwan for equipment disembarking.

== Facilities ==
Nearby is a camping site named Longmen. There is a footbridge named Rainbow Bridge (彩虹橋) linking the two parts. The watercourse of the river varies from year to year; sometimes the bridge is functional; other times it is not, because the seaside end would be in the river or in the sea.

== Events ==
Since 2000, the Hohaiyan Rock Festival has been held here for three to five days in the summer. Normally, it takes place in mid-July, and sometimes it has been delayed due to typhoon interruption or damage to the band shell facilities. Also the watercourse of the Shuang River sometimes changes shape or size, influencing the location of these temporary band shells.

== Transport links ==
=== Public transport ===
Fulong Beach is accessible by rail and bus:

- Railway: Taiwan Railway (TR) Fulong Station
- Bus:
  - Between Taipei City and Yilan County: Taipei-Luodong Seaside Route of Kingbus (國光客運) to the Fulong Stop
  - Between Taipei City and Hualien County: Taipei-Hualien Seaside Route of Airbus (大有巴士) to the Fulong Stop
  - From Keelung: Keelung-Fulong Route of Keelung Bus (基隆客運) to the Fulong Stop

=== Car transport ===
Fulong Beach is accessible by car:

- From central Taipei: the Sun Yat-sen Expressway and Northern Seaside Highway (Provincial Highway 2).
- From Southeastern Taipei: through Muzha, Shenkeng District, and Shiding District via New Taipei City Highway 106 to Pingxi District, through Ping-Shuang Tunnel to New Taipei City Highway 38, and then to Northern Seaside Highway.
- From Eastern Taiwan: via Northern Seaside Highway.

The main parking lot is next to the Fulong visitors center on the main street. Parking is free but it can be quite congested at the weekends.

== Entrance Fee ==
During summer months (and when the rock festival is not on), entrance to a part of the beach is $100NTD for adults and $10NTD for children. This includes access to the beach as well as use of showers, changing rooms etc. This does not include rental of miniature sailboats, canoes, boogie boards, beach umbrellas, or sunshade tents/awnings.

== See also ==
- List of tourist attractions in Taiwan
