= Guishan Island (Yilan) =

Island in Taiwan

Guishan (Gueishan) Island; Kueishan (Kweishan) Island
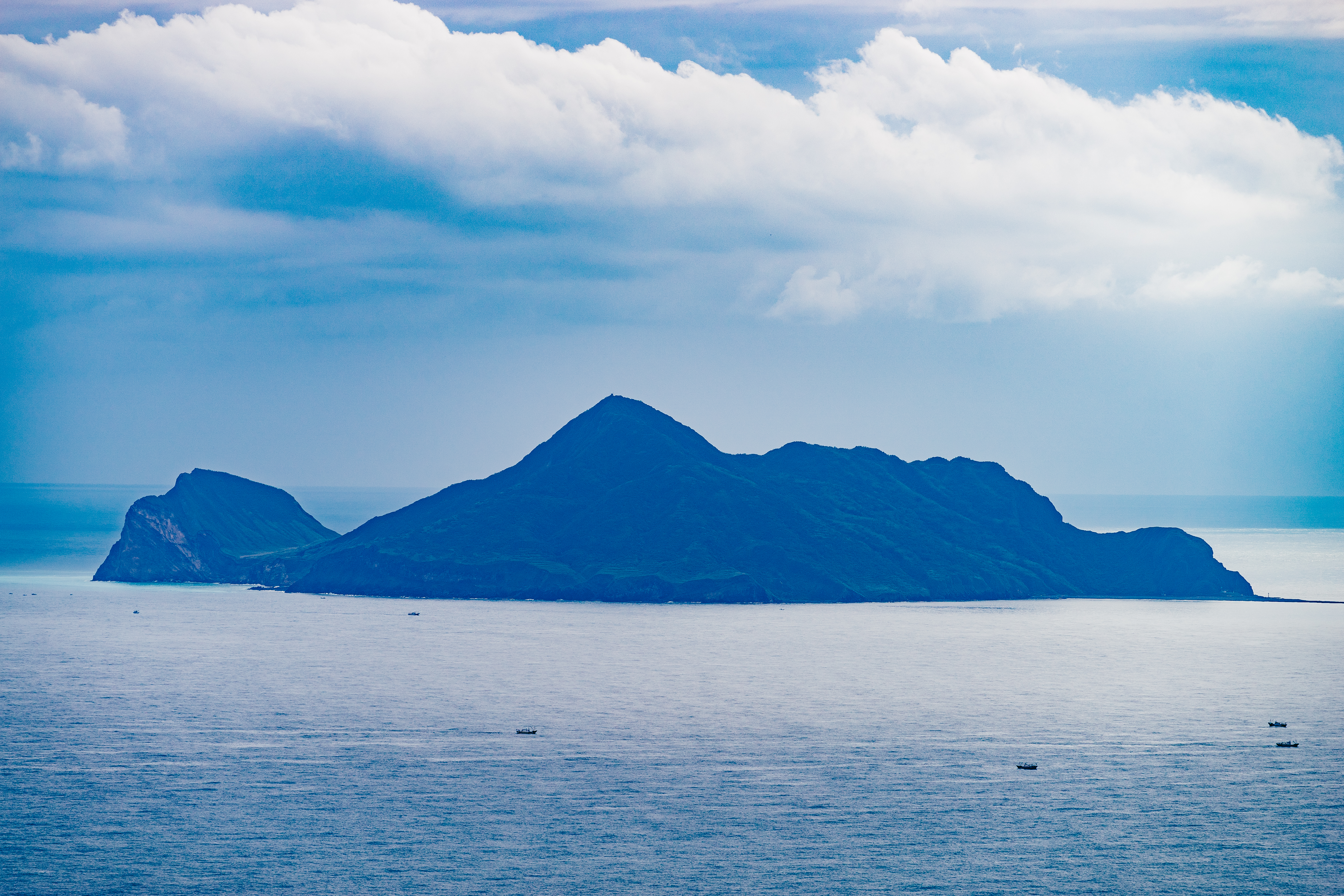

Highest point
- Elevation: 361 m (1,184 ft)
- Prominence: 361 m (1,184 ft)
- Coordinates: 24°50′31″N 121°57′06″E

Dimensions
- Area: 2.841 km^{2} (1.097 sq mi) (prior to 2024)

Geography
- Location within Taiwan
- Location: Philippine Sea, off the NE coast of Yilan, Taiwan

Geology
- Rock age: Pleistocene
- Mountain type: Stratovolcano
- Last eruption: 1853

Ku-suann-tó (Taiwanese)／Guishan Island / Gueishan Island or Steep Island or Turtle Island (Chinese: 龜山島; Hanyu Pinyin: Guīshāndǎo; Tongyong Pinyin: Gueishandǎo; Wade–Giles: Kuei^{1}-shan^{1}-tao^{3}; lit. 'Turtle Mountain Island'), also known as Kweishan Island or Kueishan Island, is an island in the Philippine Sea, part of Toucheng Township, Yilan County, Taiwan and located 9.1 km (5.7 mi) east of port of Kengfang Fishery Harbor. The island's name is derived from the resemblance of the topography of the island to that of a turtle. The island is a dormant volcano that last erupted in 1785.

There is a smaller island south of Gueishan Island called Gueiluan Island (Chinese: 龜卵島; Hanyu Pinyin: Guīluǎndǎo; Tongyong Pinyin: Gueiluǎndǎo; Wade–Giles: Kuei^{1}-luan^{3}-tao^{3}; lit. 'Turtle Egg Island').

== History ==
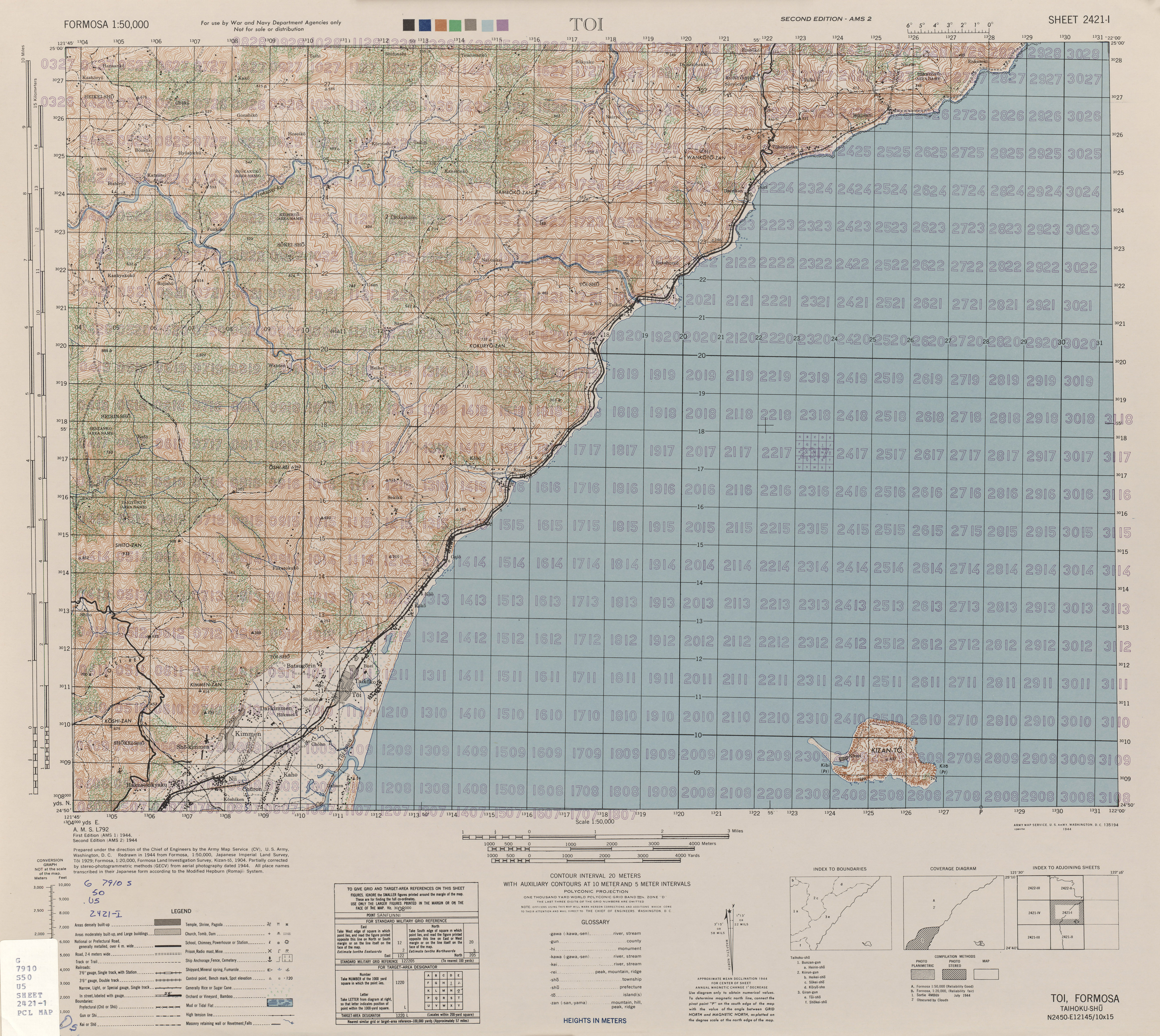
Map including Gueishan Island (labeled as KIZAN-TŌ) (1944)

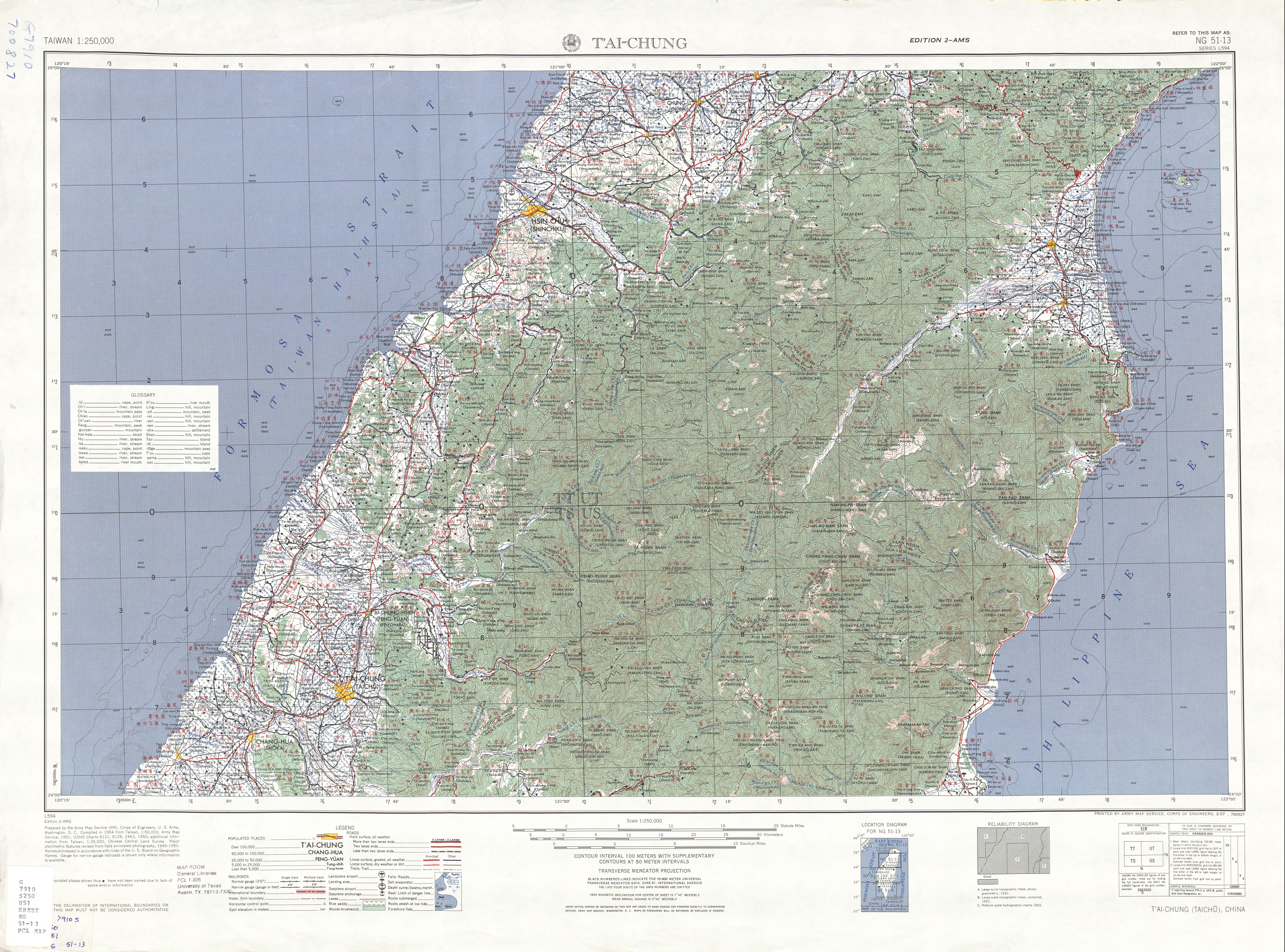
Map including Gueishan Island (labeled as "Kuei-shan Tao (Kizan-to)" 龜山島) (1954)

The local population, consisting mainly of fishermen, was relocated in 1977 due to the hardships associated with living on the island. Between 1977 and 2000, the island was used as the site of a military base and was closed to the public.

In 2000, the island was incorporated into the Northeast and Yilan Coast National Scenic Area as a maritime ecological park and officially reopened to tourists. Currently, it is managed as a tourist destination and natural conservation area, but there are restrictions on visitors numbers due to environmental protection.

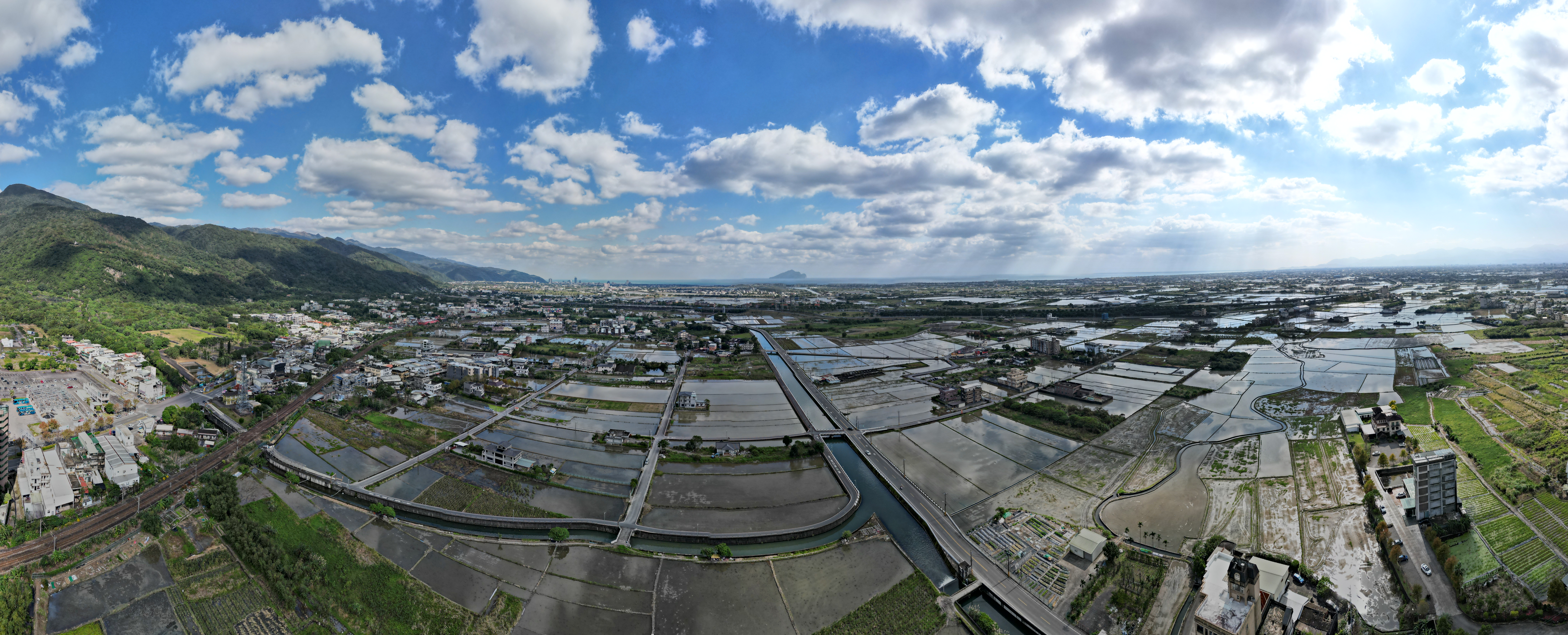
Jiaoxi Township in Yilan, with Turtle Island (龜山島), Taiwan's only active volcano, sitting on the horizon in the center of the frame.

On 13 May 2016, President Ma Ying-jeou visited the island.

In December 2016 until February 2017, the island was closed for environmental protection reasons.

On 3 April 2024, a large portion of the island collapsed into the ocean following the 2024 Taiwan earthquake.

== Geology ==
The island is the top of an andesite stratovolcano which rises from the seafloor. It is the only active volcano in Taiwan, displaying active fumaroles and solfataras. It has an area of 2.841 square kilometers (1.097 sq mi), and the highest point reaches 361 m (1,184 ft) above sea level.

== Ecology ==
An endemic species of crab, Xenograpsus testudinatus feeds on sulfur and lives around underwater hot springs of the island. Surrounding waters support a rich ecosystem that attracts the top predators of the ocean; cetaceans. This allows whale watching as one of major attractions in local tourism, targeting mostly smaller toothed whales such as pygmy sperm whales, false killer whales, and dolphins, while larger whales such as sperm whales and humpback may be observed less frequently.

== Head Turning of the Turtle Mountain ==
From different views at different locations of Yilan County, the shape of Gueishan Island is quite different. Also the shape of the turtle's head is different; from northeast coastal areas of Toucheng Township such as Shihcheng and Dasi, the shape is close to the head of a turtle, while from Luodong and Wujie Townships, the shape is triangular. The reason for this is the curvy shape of the seashore of Yilan, circling the very island. There is hence the term "Head Turning of the Turtle Mountain" (Mandarin: 龜山轉頭；Taiwanese: 龜山踅頭 Ku-suann se̍h thâu ).

== Visiting the island ==
Before going to the island, visitor numbers have to be reviewed to see which day is available for registration.

The application must be completed and shipping agreed with local ferry owners at least one week prior to the visiting date. There is also another application form for going to the highest point of the island, which is often restricted.

== See also ==
- Honeymoon Bay, Yilan
- List of volcanoes in Taiwan
- List of islands of Taiwan
