= Taihoku Prefecture =

Administrative division of Taiwan under Japanese rule

Taihoku Prefecture 臺北州
- Taihoku-shū
- 1920–1952
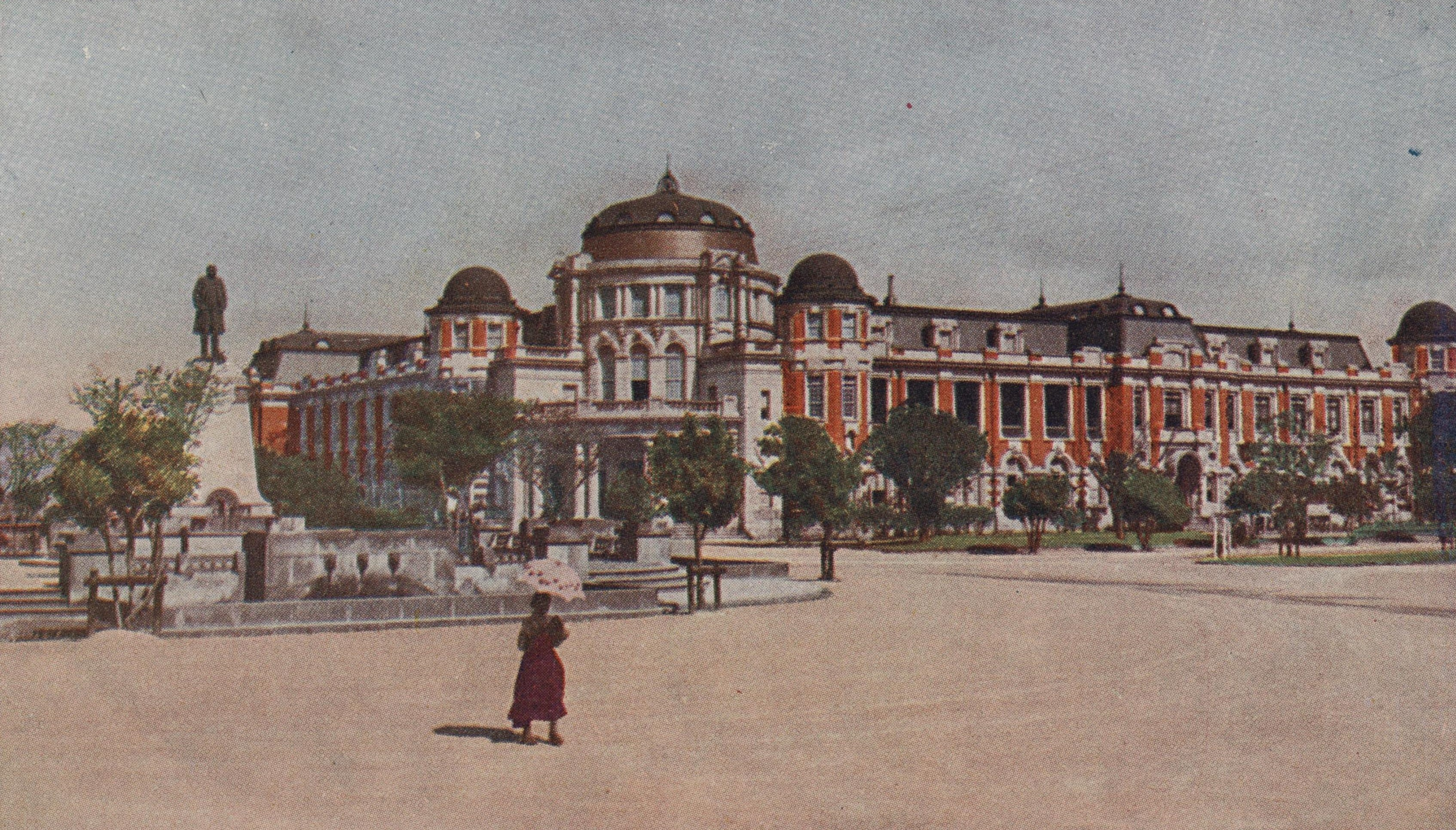
- Taihoku Prefecture government building (now the Control Yuan building)
- Capital: Taihoku City
- Area
  - 1941: 4,594.24 km^{2} (1,773.85 sq mi)
- Population
  - 1941: 1,140,530
- Historical era: Taiwan under Japanese rule
  - Established: September 1920
  - Kīrun upgraded to city: 1924
  - Gilan upgraded to city: 1940
  - Disestablished: October 25 1945
  - Japanese claim relinquished: 28 April 1952
- Political subdivisions: 3 cities (市); 9 districts (郡)
- Today part of: Keelung, New Taipei, Taipei, Yilan County

Taihoku Prefecture

Taihoku Prefecture (臺北州; Taihoku-shū) was an administrative division of Taiwan created in 1920, during Japanese rule. The prefecture consisted of modern-day Keelung, New Taipei City, Taipei and Yilan County. Its government office, which is now occupied by the Control Yuan of Taiwan, was in Taihoku City (modern-day Taipei).

== Population ==
Population statistics of permanent residents in Taihoku Prefecture in 1941:

| Classification | Population |
|---|---|
| Mainland Japanese | 153,928 |
| Taiwanese | 1,053,372 |
| Koreans | 1,051 |
| Others | 25,531 |
| Total | 1,233,882 |

== Administrative divisions ==
=== Cities and districts ===
There were 3 cities and 9 districts under Taihoku Prefecture.

| Cities (市 shi) | | | | Districts (郡 gun) | | | |
| Name | Kanji | Kana | Rōmaji | Name | Kanji | Kana | Rōmaji |
|---|---|---|---|---|---|---|---|
| Taihoku City | 台北市 | たいほくし | Taihoku-shi | Shichisei District | 七星郡 | しちせいぐん | Shichisei-gun |
| Taihoku City | 台北市 | たいほくし | Taihoku-shi | Shinshō District | 新莊郡 | しんしょうぐん | Shinshō-gun |
| Taihoku City | 台北市 | たいほくし | Taihoku-shi | Kaizan District | 海山郡 | かいざんぐん | Kaizan-gun |
| Taihoku City | 台北市 | たいほくし | Taihoku-shi | Bunzan District | 文山郡 | ぶんさんぐん | Bunzan-gun |
| Taihoku City | 台北市 | たいほくし | Taihoku-shi | Tansui District | 淡水郡 | たんすいぐん | Tansui-gun |
| Kīrun City | 基隆市 | きいるんし | Kīrun-shi | Kīrun District | 基隆郡 | きいるんぐん | Kīrun-gun |
| Giran City | 宜蘭市 | ぎらんし | Giran-shi | Giran District | 宜蘭郡 | ぎらんぐん | Giran-gun |
| Giran City | 宜蘭市 | ぎらんし | Giran-shi | Ratō District | 羅東郡 | らとうぐん | Ratō-gun |
| Giran City | 宜蘭市 | ぎらんし | Giran-shi | Suō District | 蘇澳郡 | すおうぐん | Suō-gun |

All of the cities (市 shi) name in Chinese characters is carried from Japanese to Chinese.

=== Towns and villages ===
| District | Name | Kanji | Administrative divisions of Taiwan | Note |
|---|---|---|---|---|
| Shichisei 七星郡 | Shiodome town | 汐止街 | Xizhi District (汐止區), New Taipei City | |
| Shichisei 七星郡 | Shirin town | 士林街 | Shilin District (士林區), Taipei | |
| Shichisei 七星郡 | Hokutō town | 北投街 | Beitou District (北投區), Taipei | Upgraded from village in 1941. |
| Shichisei 七星郡 | Naiko village | 內湖庄 | Nangang District (南港區), Taipei | |
| Shichisei 七星郡 | Naiko village | 內湖庄 | Neihu District (內湖區), Taipei | |
| Shichisei 七星郡 | Matsuyama village | 松山庄 | Songshan District (松山區), Taipei | Incorporated into Taihoku City in 1938. |
| Shichisei 七星郡 | Matsuyama village | 松山庄 | Xinyi District (信義區), Taipei | Incorporated into Taihoku City in 1938. |
| Shinshō 新莊郡 | Shinshō town | 新莊街 | Taishan District (泰山區), New Taipei City | |
| Shinshō 新莊郡 | Shinshō town | 新莊街 | Xinzhuang District (新莊區), New Taipei City | |
| Shinshō 新莊郡 | Roshū village | 鷺洲庄 | Luzhou District (蘆洲區), New Taipei City | |
| Shinshō 新莊郡 | Roshū village | 鷺洲庄 | Sanchong District (三重區), New Taipei City | |
| Shinshō 新莊郡 | Goko village | 五股庄 | Wugu District (五股區), New Taipei City | |
| Shinshō 新莊郡 | Rinkō village | 林口庄 | Linkou District (林口區), New Taipei City | |
| Kaizan 海山郡 | Itahashi town | 板橋街 | Banqiao District (板橋區), New Taipei City | |
| Kaizan 海山郡 | Ōka town | 鶯歌街 | Shulin District (樹林區), New Taipei City | |
| Kaizan 海山郡 | Ōka town | 鶯歌街 | Yingge District (鶯歌區), New Taipei City | |
| Kaizan 海山郡 | Sankyō town | 三峽街 | Sanxia District (三峽區), New Taipei City | |
| Kaizan 海山郡 | Chūwa village | 中和庄 | Yonghe District (永和區), New Taipei City | |
| Kaizan 海山郡 | Chūwa village | 中和庄 | Zhonghe District (中和區), New Taipei City | |
| Kaizan 海山郡 | Dojō village | 土城庄 | Tucheng District (土城區), New Taipei City | |
| Bunsan 文山郡 | Shinten town | 新店街 | Xindian District (新店區), New Taipei City | |
| Bunsan 文山郡 | Shinkō village | 深坑庄 | Shenkeng District (深坑區), New Taipei City | |
| Bunsan 文山郡 | Shinkō village | 深坑庄 | Wenshan District (文山區), Taipei | |
| Bunsan 文山郡 | Sekitei village | 石碇庄 | Shiding District (石碇區), New Taipei City | |
| Bunsan 文山郡 | Heirin village | 坪林庄 | Pinglin District (坪林區), New Taipei City | |
| Bunsan 文山郡 | Aboriginal Area | 蕃地 | Wulai District (烏來區), New Taipei City | |
| Tansui 淡水郡 | Tansui town | 淡水街 | Tamsui District (淡水區), New Taipei City | |
| Tansui 淡水郡 | Hachiri village | 八里庄 | Bali District (八里區), New Taipei City | |
| Tansui 淡水郡 | Sanshi village | 三芝庄 | Sanzhi District (三芝區), New Taipei City | |
| Tansui 淡水郡 | Sekimon village | 石門庄 | Shimen District (石門區), New Taipei City | |
| Kiryū 基隆郡 | Zuihō town | 瑞芳街 | Ruifang District (瑞芳區), New Taipei City | |
| Kiryū 基隆郡 | Banri village | 萬里庄 | Wanli District (萬里區), New Taipei City | |
| Kiryū 基隆郡 | Kanayama village | 金山庄 | Jinshan District (金山區), New Taipei City | |
| Kiryū 基隆郡 | Shichito village | 七堵庄 | Nuannuan District (暖暖區), Keelung | |
| Kiryū 基隆郡 | Shichito village | 七堵庄 | Qidu District (七堵區), Keelung | |
| Kiryū 基隆郡 | Kōryō village | 貢寮庄 | Gongliao District (貢寮區), New Taipei City | |
| Kiryū 基隆郡 | Sōkei village | 雙溪庄 | Shuangxi District (雙溪區), New Taipei City | |
| Kiryū 基隆郡 | Heikei village | 平溪庄 | Pingxi District (平溪區), New Taipei City | |
| Kiryū 基隆郡 | Kiryū town | 基隆街 | Keelung (基隆市) | Upgraded to a city in 1924. |
| Giran 宜蘭郡 | Tōi village | 頭圍庄 | Toucheng Township (頭城鎮), | |
| Giran 宜蘭郡 | Shōkei village | 礁溪庄 | Jiaoxi Township (礁溪鄉), | |
| Giran 宜蘭郡 | Sōi village | 壯圍庄 | Zhuangwei Township (壯圍鄉), | |
| Giran 宜蘭郡 | Inzan village | 員山庄 | Yuanshan Township (員山鄉), | |
| Giran 宜蘭郡 | Giran town | 宜蘭街 | Yilan City (宜蘭市), Yilan County | Upgraded to a city in 1940. |
| Ratō 羅東郡 | Ratō town | 羅東街 | Luodong Township (羅東鎮), Yilan County | |
| Ratō 羅東郡 | Goketsu village | 五結庄 | Wujie Township (五結鄉), Yilan County | |
| Ratō 羅東郡 | Sansei village | 三星庄 | Sanxing Township (三星鄉), Yilan County | |
| Ratō 羅東郡 | Tōzan village | 冬山庄 | Dongshan Township (冬山鄉), Yilan County | |
| Ratō 羅東郡 | Aboriginal Area | 蕃地 | Datong Township (大同鄉), Yilan County | |
| Suō 蘇澳郡 | Suō town | 蘇澳街 | Su'ao Township (蘇澳鎮), Yilan County | |
| Suō 蘇澳郡 | Aboriginal Area | 蕃地 | Nan'ao Township (南澳鄉), Yilan County | |

== Buildings and establishments ==
=== Hospitals ===
- Taihoku Imperial University Hospital (臺北帝國大學醫學部附屬病院)
- Japanese Red Cross Society Taiwan Branch Hospital (赤十字社臺灣支部病院)
- Government-General of Taiwan Monopoly Bureau Mutual Aid Association Hospital (臺灣総督府専売局共済組合病院)
- Government-General of Taiwan Railway Bureau Taihoku Railway Hospital (臺灣総督府鉭道局台北鉄道病院)
- Government-General of Taiwan Giran Hospital (臺灣総督府宜蘭病院)
- Government-General of Taiwan Kīrun Hospital (臺灣総督府基隆病院)

=== Courthouses ===
Courthouses in 1945 (Shōwa 20)

- Supreme Court of Appeal (高等法院上告部)
- Supreme Judicial Court (高等法院覆審部)
- Taihoku Regional Court (臺北地方法院)
- Taihoku Regional Court Giran Branch (臺北地方法院宜蘭支部)

=== Penitentiaries ===
Penitentiaries in 1932 (Shōwa 7)

- Taihoku Penitentiary (臺北刑務所)
- Taihoku Penitentiary Giran Branch (臺北刑務所宜蘭刑務支所)

=== Police stations ===
Police stations in 1945 (Shōwa 20)

- Taihoku Prefecture Police Administrative Division (臺北州警務部)
- Taihoku Minami Police Station (臺北南警察署)
  - Banka Substation (萬華分署)
- Taihoku Kita Police Station (臺北北警察署)
- Kīrun Police Station (基隆警察署)
- Kīrun Suijō Police Station (基隆水上警察署) (in Port of Kīrun)
- Giran Police Station (宜蘭警察署)
- Shichisei District Police Office (七星郡警察課)
- Tansui District Police Office (淡水郡警察課)
- Kīrun District Police Office (基隆郡警察課)
- Giran District Police Office (宜蘭郡警察課)
- Ratō District Police Office (羅東郡警察課)
- Suō District Police Office (蘇澳郡警察課)
- Bunsan District Police Office (文山郡警察課)
- Kaizan District Police Office (海山郡警察課)
- Shinshō District Police Office (新荘郡警察課)

== Weather stations ==
=== Mines ===
- Kinkaseki mine (金瓜山鉱山) (Gold, Silver, Copper)
- Zuihō mine (瑞芳鉱山) (Gold, Silver)
- Kīrun coal mine (基隆炭鉱)
- Zuihō coal mine (瑞芳炭鉱)
- Haccho coal mine (八堵炭鉱)
- Ishisoko coal mine (石底炭鉱)
- Banri coal mine (万里炭鉱)
- Tokukō Taihoku coal mine (徳興台北炭鉱)
- Kuangsui sulfur mine (大礦砕鉱山)
- Fukuyama coal mine (福山炭鉱)
- Itabashi coal mine (板橋炭鉱)
- Kaizan coal mine (海山炭鉱)

=== Shintō shrines ===
- Taiwan Grand Shrine
- Giran Shrine
- Kīrun Shrine
- Taiwan Martyr Shrine
- Taihoku Inari Shrine
- Kenkō Shrine
- Zuihō Shrine
- Shinshō Shrine
- Ratō Shrine
- Shiodome Shrine
- Umiyama Shrine
- Tamsui Shrine
- Bunsan Shrine
- Suō Shrine

=== National Parks ===
- Daiton National Park (Established on 12 December 1937)
- Tsugitaka Taroko National Park (Established on 12 December 1937)

== Transport ==
=== Roads ===
Designated roads in 1939 (Shōwa 14)

- 縦貫道路
- Taihoku Tamsui Road (台北淡水道)
- Taihoku Naiko Road (台北内湖道)
- 台北和尚州道
- Taihoku Itabashi Road (台北板橋道)
- 児玉町枋寮道
- 台北八里庄道
- 台北三張犂道
- Taihoku Shinkō Road (台北深坑道)
- Taihoku Giran Road (台北宜蘭道)
- 水道町松山道
- 景尾亀山道
- 板橋景尾道
- 枋寮土城道
- Itabashi Tōen Road (板橋桃園道)
- Itabashi Ōka Road (板橋鶯歌道)
- Shinshō Itabashi Road (新荘板橋道)
- 新荘樹林道
- 新荘和尚州道
- 新荘淡水道
- Tamsui Kanayama Road (淡水金山道)
- 北投草山道
- Shirin Kanayama Road (士林金山道)
- 基隆金山道
- 基隆社寮島道
- 基隆礁渓道
- Giran Suō Road (宜蘭蘇澳道)
- 羅東利沢簡道
- 蘇澳南方澳道
- 蘇澳北方澳道
- Ratō Sansei Road (羅東三星道)
- Giran Tōen Road (宜蘭桃園道)
- 羅東清水道
- 宜蘭東港道
- 宜蘭三鬮道
- Giran Sansei Road (宜蘭三星道)
- Suō Karenkō Road (蘇澳花蓮港道)
- Hokutō Onsen Road (北投温泉道)

=== Ports ===
Open ports in 1938 (Shōwa 13)

- Port of Kīrun (基隆港)
- Port of Tamsui (淡水港)

== Notable people ==
List of notable people born in, or who grew up or were active in Taihoku Prefecture during Japanese rule.

- Lee Teng-hui, former president of the Republic of China (born 15 January 1923 in Sanshi village).
- Birei Kin, National Policy Advisor to President Chen Shui-bian, Taiwan independence activist, social commentator (born 7 February 1934).
- Chiang Wei-shui, politician (8 February 1891 – 5 August 1931)
- Huang Lingzhi, writer.
- Li Mei-shu, artist.

== See also ==
- Political divisions of Taiwan (1895-1945)
- Governor-General of Taiwan
- Taiwan under Japanese rule
