= Baozhong =

Baozhong may refer to:

- Baozhong tea, a kind of tea
- Baozhong, Yunlin, a rural township in Yunlin County, Taiwan
