= Jingmei River =

River in Taiwan

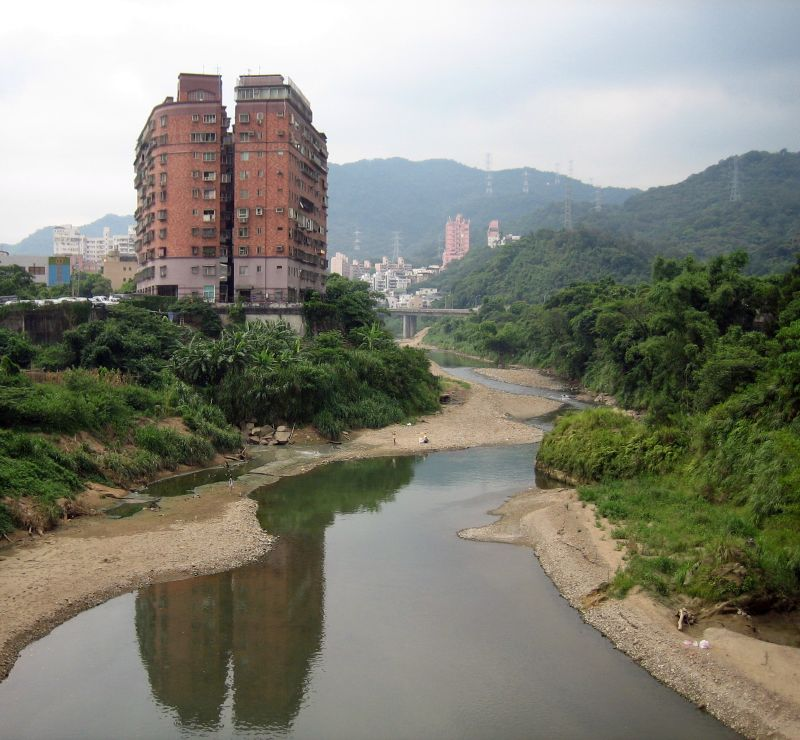

- Map showing the mouth of Jingmei River at its confluence with the Xindian River

Location
- Country: Taiwan

Physical characteristics
- Mouth
  - location: Xindian River above the Fuhe Bridge
  - coordinates: 25.0003°N 121.5339°E
- Length: 28.25 km (17.55 mi)
- Basin size: 113.72 km^{2} (43.91 sq mi)

Basin features
- River system: Tamsui River

The Jingmei River (Chinese: 景美溪; pinyin: Jǐngměi Xī; Wade–Giles: Ching^{3}-mei^{3} Hsi^{1}) is a major tributary of the Xindian River, which itself is a major tributary of the Tamsui River, Taiwan. It is located between the Taipei Basin and Beishi River basin and flows through New Taipei City and the capital, Taipei City, for 28.1 kilometers, before joining the Xindian River at the border of Wenshan District, Taipei, and Yonghe District, New Taipei City, above the Fuhe Bridge.

== See also ==
- List of rivers in Taiwan
