= Beishi River Historical Trail =

Trail in New Taipei, Taiwan

Coordinates: 24°57′21.1″N 121°47′18.2″E

Beishi River Historical Trail 北勢溪古道
- Length: 2.6 km
- Location: Pinglin and Shuangxi in New Taipei, Taiwan
- Trailheads: Heilongtan Campground; Liaojiaokeng Community
- Use: walking

Beishi River Historical Trail (Chinese: 北勢溪古道; pinyin: Běishì Xī Gǔdào) is a trail in Pinglin District and Shuangxi District in New Taipei, Taiwan.

== Geology ==
The trail follows the paths along Beishi River for a distance of 2.6 km. It has two entrances, one located near Heilongtan Campground in Pinglin District and the other located at Liaojiaokeng Community in Shuangxi District.

== Architecture ==
There is an earth god shrine located at the beginning of the trail.

== Transportation ==
The trail is accessible by bus from Shuangxi Station.

== See also ==
- Pingxi Historical Trail
- Shakadang Trail
