= Nanshi =

Nanshi may refer to:

- Nanshi District, Baoding, in Hebei, China
- Nanshi District, Shanghai, historical district of Shanghai, merged to Huangpu District, Shanghai, China
- Nanshi River, in Taiwan
- Nanshi, Tainan, or Nansi, Nanxi, township in Tainan County, Taiwan
- Nan Shi, or History of Southern Dynasties, Chinese official history book for the Southern Dynasties

== See also ==
- Foshan Nanshi F.C., a Chinese football club
- History of the Southern Dynasties, Chinese historical work
- Nanshijiao metro station, a metro station of Taipei Metro
