= Birei Kin =

- 金 美齢
- Born: 7 February 1934 (age 92); Taihoku Prefecture, Taiwan under Japanese rule
- Citizenship: Japan (1934–45; 2009–); Taiwan (1945–2009)
- Education: Waseda University (BLitt, MLitt)
- Occupations: Critic; commentator; political activist; Waseda University part-time English Lecturer; Shibanaga International School-JET Japanese Language School Chairperson; National Policy Adviser for the President of the Republic of China (2000–05, 2005–06)
- Television: Asamade-sei TV! (EX); Birei Kin to Sutekina Nakama-tachi (Channel Sakura); Hikari Ota's If I Were Prime Minister... Secretary Tanaka (NTV); Takajin no soko made Itte Iinkai (YTV)
- Movement: Taiwan independence movement
- Spouse: Eimei Shu (m. 1964–2006)
- Children: Mana Shu
- Website: Official homepage

Birei Kin (金 美齢, Kin Birei; Chinese: 金美齡; Wade–Giles: Kim Bi-Ling; born 7 February 1934, in Taihoku Prefecture, Taiwan under Japanese rule) is a Taiwan-born Japanese critic and political activist. She is also known by the name Alice King. Kin is the president of the Shibanaga International School-JET Japanese Language School, and served as national policy adviser to President of the Republic of China Chen Shui-bian from 2000 to 2005. Her husband was Eimei Shu and she has a daughter and a son. Her eldest daughter is Tokyo Broadcasting System Television business office manager Mana Shu.

For many years Kin has been involved in the Taiwan independence movement.

== Bibliography ==
=== Solo author ===
| Year | Title | ISBN |
|---|---|---|
| 1998 | Jibun no Jinsei, Jibun de Jimeru ―― Iubeki koto o Iu Onna no Ikikata | ISBN 4-06-264087-2 |
| 1999 | Sekaiichi Yutakade Shiawasena Juni to, Arigatami o Shiranai Fuan na Hitobito | ISBN 4-569-60729-2 |
| 1999 | Tonari no Kuni kara mita Nihon | |
| 1999 | Birei Kin no Chokugen | ISBN 4-89831-013-3 |
| 2000 | Nihonjin ni Umarete Shiawasedesuka | ISBN 4-7593-0645-5 |
| 2001 | Birei Kin no Watashi wa Oni ka a-chan | ISBN 4-900682-61-6 |
| 2002 | Birei Kin to Sutekina Otoko-tachi | ISBN 4-89831-041-9 |
| 2003 | Dare no tame ni Ikiru no ka ―― Jinsei no Kiki wa Chie to Yūki de Norikoeru | ISBN 4-7593-0757-5 |
| 2003 | San Kazoku 11-ri de Kurashite mitara ―― Sansedaidōkyo Monogatari | ISBN 4-594-04162-0 |
| 2004 | "Oni ka a-chan" no susume ―― Kitaete koso Ko wa Nobiru | ISBN 4-09-405481-2 |
| 2005 | Nihon ga Kodomo-tachi ni Oshienakatta koto | ISBN 4-569-64276-4 |
| 2006 | Nihon hodo Kakusa no nai Kuni wa arimasen! | ISBN 978-4-89831-558-3 |
| 2007 | Ima Nihon ni Kitai suru koto | |
| 2007 | Nihon wa Sekai de Ichiban Yume mo Kibō mo aru Kunidesu! | ISBN 978-4-569-69201-2 |
| 2007 | Nihonjin no Kakugo | ISBN 978-4-89831-565-1 |
| 2007 | Fūfu Junai | ISBN 978-4-09-387747-3 |
| 2007 | Rintoshita Ikikata ―― Jibun no Jinsei, Jibun de Kimeru | ISBN 978-4-569-69521-1 |
| 2008 | Sengo Nihonjin no Wasuremono ―― Birei Kin no Chokugen | ISBN 978-4-89831-576-7 |
| 2008 | Nihon no Hatasu Yakuwari to Susumubeki Hōkō ―― Dai 34-kai Bōei Seminar Kōen-shū | |
| 2008 | Rintoshita Hahaoya ga Nihon o Sukuu | ISBN 978-4-569-70103-5 |
| 2008 | Seijika no Hinkaku, Yūkensha no Hinkaku | ISBN 978-4-7771-0892-3 |
| 2008 | Birei Kin no "Rōgo wa Jinsei no Sōkessan" desu! | ISBN 978-4-7593-1048-1 |
| 2009 | "O hitori-sama" de Shiawasedesuka | ISBN 978-4-569-77033-8 |
| 2010 | Watashi wa, naze Nihonkokumin to natta no ka | ISBN 978-4-89831-617-7 |
| 2011 | Rintoshita Nihonjin | ISBN 978-4-569-79663-5 |
| 2011 | Utsukushiku Yowaiwokasaneru | ISBN 978-4-898-31653-5 |
| 2013 | Seijika no Hinkaku, Yūkensha no Hinkaku | ISBN 4777124290 |

=== Co-authored, edited, co-edited ===
| Year | Title | Co-author | ISBN |
|---|---|---|---|
| 1996 | Kagi wa "Taiwan" ni ari! ―― "Bi-dai" Shin Kankei ga Asia o Kaeru | Yusuke Fukuda | ISBN 4-16-351320-5 |
| 1997 | Daichūka Shugi wa Asia o Kōfuku ni shinai | Ng Chiau-tong | ISBN 4-7942-0763-8 |
| 1998 | "Furyō Shōjo" kara Cosmopolitan ni | Yoshiharu Fukuhara | ISBN 4-7630-9841-1 |
| 1999 | Kodomo wa Matteru! Oya no Deban | Yoshinori Kobayashi, Shiro Takahashi, Eita Namikawa | ISBN 4-900682-37-3 |
| 1999 | Jiritsu dekinai Kuni Nihon ―― Yūkigāreba Jinsei wa Hirakeru | Yoshiko Sakurai | ISBN 4-537-02714-2 |
| 2000 | Teki wa Chūgoku nari ―― Nihon wa Taiwan to Dōmei o Musube | Yusuke Fukuda | ISBN 4-334-97283-7 |
| 2001 | Nihon yo, Taiwan yo ―― Kuni o Aishi, Hito o Aisuru koto | Eimei Shu | ISBN 4-594-03043-2 |
| 2001 | Nyūkoku Kyohi ―― "Taiwan-ron" wa naze Yaka reta ka | Yoshinori Kobayashi | ISBN 4-344-00095-1 |
| 2001 | Tokyo no Mado kara Nihon o | Shintaro Ishihara | ISBN 4-89036-130-8 |
| 2002 | Kenshō Yasukunimondai to wa Nanika | | ISBN 4-569-62266-6 |
| 2003 | Owarai Nitchū Sentō Sengen! | Terry Ito, Koui Chou | ISBN 4-408-32177-X |
| 2004 | Wagakuni no Shōnen Hikō no Genjō ni omō ―― 21 Seiki ni Ikiru Wakōdo-tachi no Takumashī Seichō o Negatte ―― Shōnen Mondai Symposium "Shomondai no Kaiketsu no Kagi wa, Oya ga Kawaru koto" | | |
| 2004 | Kenpō no Ronten ―― "Seiron" Kessaku-sen Seiron "Hō no Fubi no moto Kokumin o Mamoru no wa Dare ka" | Shintaro Ishihara, Toshiyuki Shikata | ISBN 4-594-04810-2 |
| 2004 | "Aikokushin" "Kokueki" to wa nanika.―― Asamade-sei TV! | Masaru Kaneko, Kang Sang-jung, Yoshinori Kobayashi, Hajime Takano, Susumu Nishibe, Keiko Higuchi, Satoshi Morimoto | ISBN 4-7762-0133-X |
| 2008 | Onna wa Kashikoku Tsuyoku are! | Yoshiko Sakurai | ISBN 978-4-89831-589-7 |
| 2009 | Kubi-kiri Fuyō! ―― Dai Restru Jidai e no Shohōsen "Nihon no Wakamono, Hakkiri Itte "Amae-sugi" desu" | | ISBN 978-4-569-70876-8 |
| 2009 | Nihon o Zan suru Hitobito ―― Fusakui no "Genjitsu Shugi" ni Dashita Tohai o Nazashi de Tadasu | Shōichi Watanabe, Hidetsugu Yagi | ISBN 978-4-569-70810-2 |
| 2010 | Aien-ka Tsūshin "Watashi wa Suwanai. Keredo 'Kenen-ken o Furikazasu no wa ijimedesu'" | | ISBN 978-4-89831-143-1 |
| 2010 | Oconomission "Genki wa Shoku ni Ari, Shoku wa Genki ni Aru" | | |
| 2011 | "Kimitachi ga, Nihon no tame ni dekiru koto Daigakusei ni Tsutaetai Sokoku to no Kizuna" | | |

=== Translations ===
| Year | Title | Author | ISBN |
|---|---|---|---|
| 1992 | Chūgoku no Kanashī Isan ―― Kono Shi Jū-nen no Kenetsu naki Shōgen | Betty Pao Road | ISBN 4-7942-0480-9 |
| 1997 | Nanatsu no Chūgoku ―― 21 Seiki Chūgoku no Haken Shugi kara Zen Jinrui o Surutameni | Wang Wenshan | ISBN 4-16-353720-1 |
| 2002 | Taiwan yo ―― Ri Tōki Tōsō Jitsuroku | Zou Jingwen | ISBN 4-594-03830-1 |

=== Magazine articles ===
Title
Gekkan Jiyū Minshu "Gekkan riburu"

=== Filmography ===
| Year | Title | Network | Notes |
|---|---|---|---|
| 2007 | Hōdō 2001 | Fuji TV | |
| 2007 | Beat Takeshi no TV Tackle | TV Asahi | |
| 2007 | Itsumite mo Haranbanjō | NTV | |
| | Asamade-sei TV! | TV Asahi | |
| | Birei Kin to Sutekina Nakama-tachi | Channel Sakura | |
| | Hikari Ota's If I Were Prime Minister... Secretary Tanaka | NTV | |
| | Takajin no soko made Itte Iinkai | YTV | |
| | Mirai Vision: Genki Dase! Nippon! | BS11 | "Asia no Leader to shite no Nihon" |

== See also ==
- Shinzō Abe
- Yoshinori Kobayashi
- Shi Wen-long
- Japanophile
- Taiwanization
