= Pinglin District =

District in New Taipei, Taiwan

Pinglin 坪林區 Heirin
- District
- Pinglin District
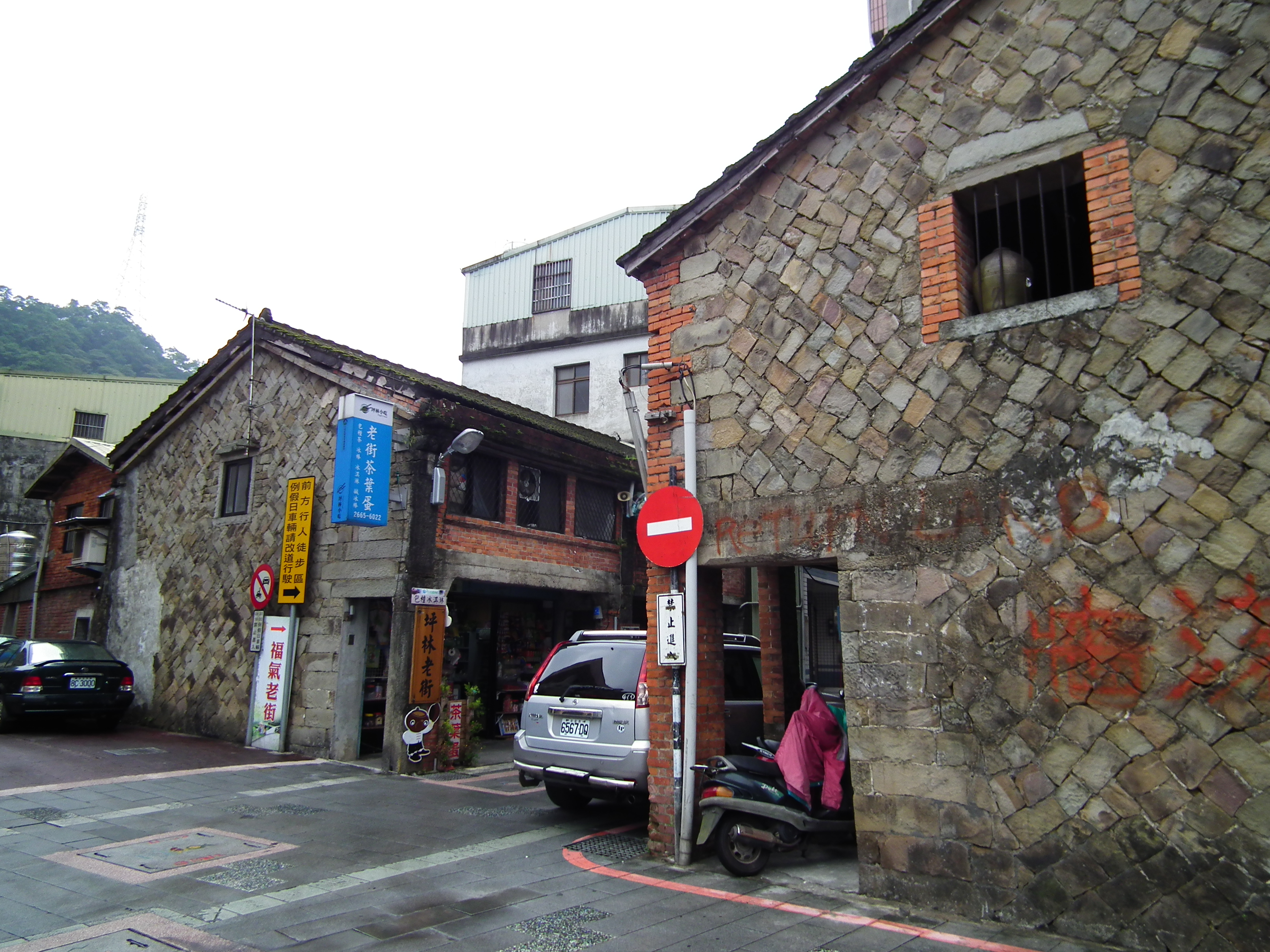

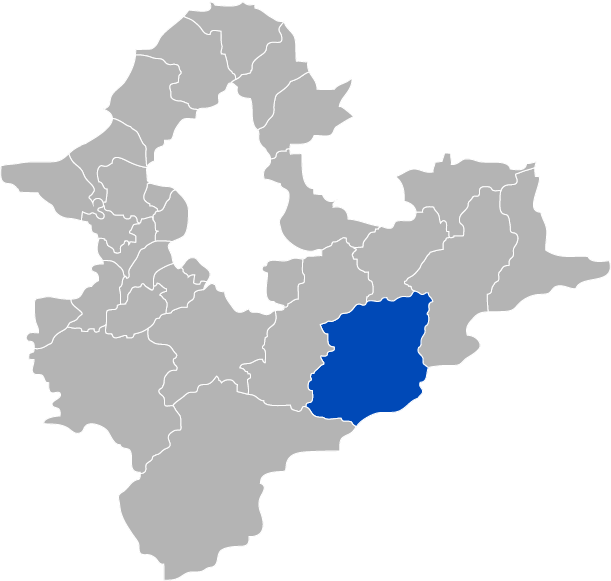
- Location in New Taipei City
- Coordinates: 24°55′28″N 121°43′36″E
- Country: Republic of China (Taiwan)
- Special municipality: New Taipei City

Population (February 2023)
  - Total: 6,547
- Time zone: +8
- Website: www.pinglin.ntpc.gov.tw (in Chinese)

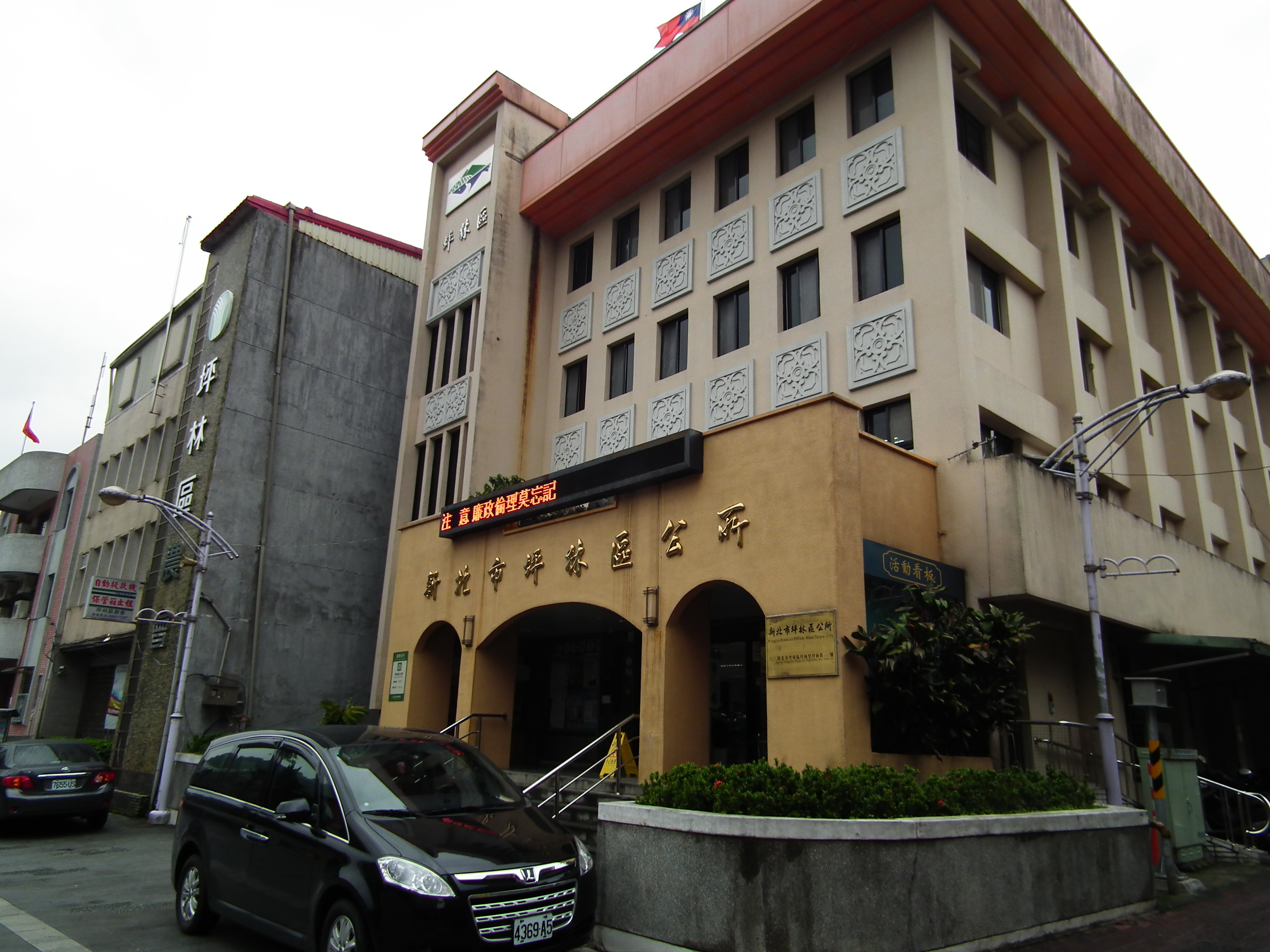
Pinglin District Office

Pinglin District (a.k.a. Ping-Lin, Chinese: 坪林區; pinyin: Pínglín Qū; Pe̍h-ōe-jī: Pîⁿ-nâ-khu) is a rural district of southeastern New Taipei, Taiwan. It is the third-largest district of New Taipei City and it is located in the mountainous area bordering Yilan County.

== Overview ==
Pinglin is part of the water district of the greater Taipei area as the Feicui Dam is located in the neighboring Shiding District, so land development is restricted. Pinglin is most known for producing pouchong tea. The Pinglin Tea Museum is the world's largest tea museum. Over 80% of its residents are tea growers or are involved in the tea business.

== Geography ==
- Area: 170.84 km^{2}
- Population: 6,547 people (February 2023)

== Tourist attractions ==
- Beishi River Historical Trail
- Ping-Lin Tea Museum
- Jingualiao River Fish-Watching Trails
- Jingualiao Tiema Recreation Park
- Jiuchionggen Mountain Trails

== Transportation ==
=== Roads ===
- National Highway No. 5, also known as Beiyi or the Chiang Wei-shui Freeway.
- Highway No. 9, also known as Beiyi Highway.

=== Bus ===
- Bus 923- from Xindian metro station (weekdays: leaves hourly at half-past the hour, weekends: on the hour and half-past)
- Bus Green 12 (綠12)- from Xindian metro station (weekdays: leaves at :15 and :45)

== See also ==
- New Taipei City
