= Zhongzheng Riverside Park =

Park in Taipei, Taiwan

- Interactive map of Zhongzheng Riverside Park
- Type: Municipal
- Location: Taipei, Taiwan
- Coordinates: 25.023°N 121.514°E
- Open: All year

Zhongzheng Riverside Park is a riverside park along the Xindian River in Taipei City, Taiwan. It is located in the southern corner of Wanhua District, at the western end of Zhongzheng Bridge. The park includes an overpass that provides views of expressway traffic below and a distant sight of the Taipei 101 skyscraper.A key attraction is the "Hello Park" children's playground area, featuring Taiwan's first ring-shaped slide swing and a zipline.

Zhongzheng Riverside Park is popular for seasonal flower displays, often featuring large-scale "seas of flowers with over 130,000 pots planted in certain periods like autumn.
