= Ping-Lin Tea Museum =

Museum in Pinglin, New Taipei, Taiwan

- 坪林茶業博物館
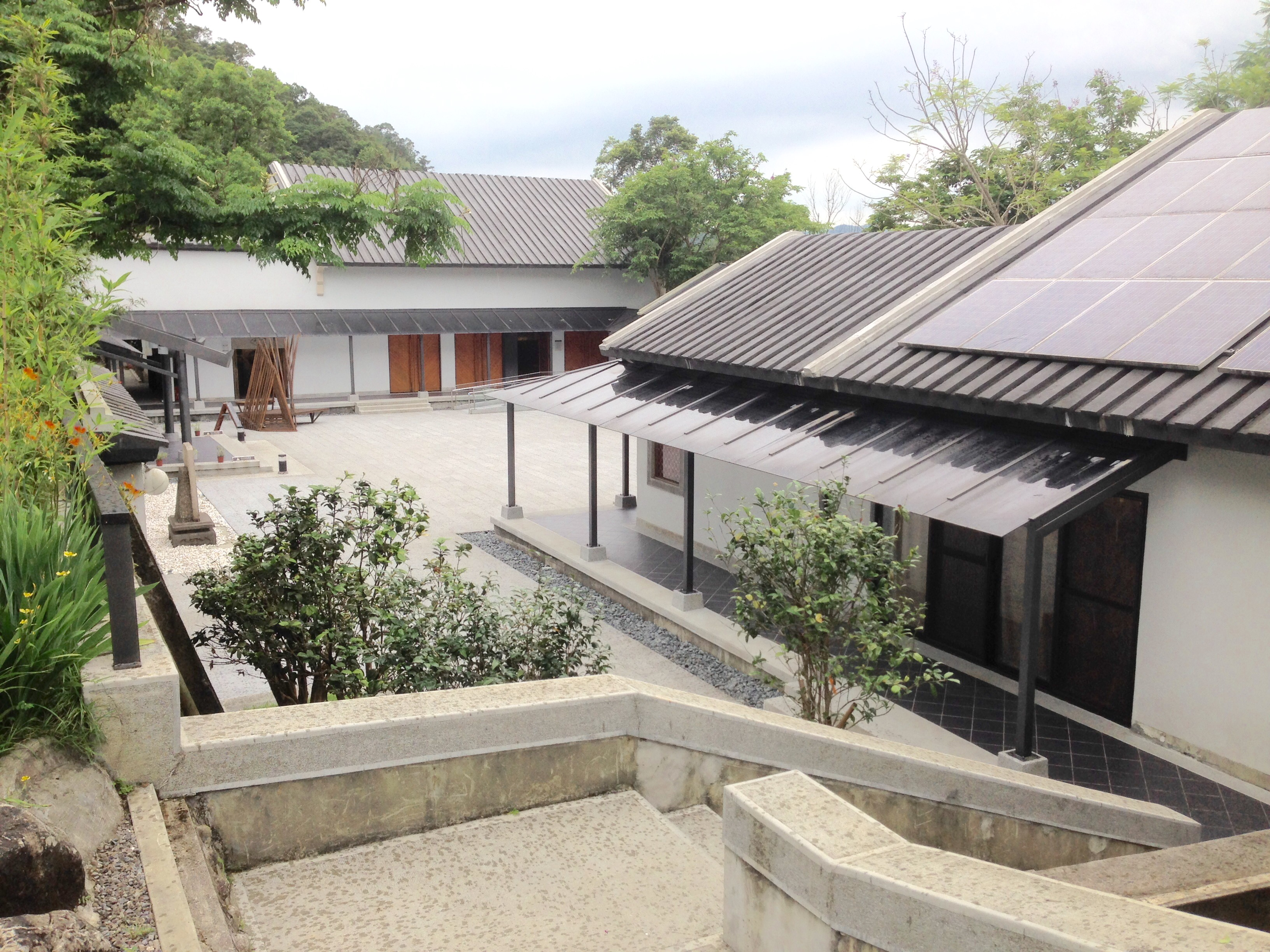
- Established: 12 January 1997
- Location: Pinglin, New Taipei, Taiwan
- Coordinates: 24°56′04.0″N 121°42′45.0″E
- Type: museum

The Ping-Lin Tea Museum (traditional Chinese: 坪林茶業博物館; simplified Chinese: 坪林茶业博物馆; pinyin: Pínglín Cháyè Bówùguǎn), also spelled Pinglin Tea Museum, is a museum located in the hills of Pinglin District, New Taipei, Taiwan. It is one of the world's largest tea museums.

Ping-Lin is renowned for producing Pouchong tea. The picking of the "spring tea" starts around the end of March.

== History ==
The museum was opened on 12 January 1997.

== Architecture ==
The museum is built in Fujianese architecture, with a large circular courtyard along with long halls and round doors, it also has some Brutalist influence, a style characterized by monolithic, geometric forms, and exposed raw materials, primarily concrete. It emerged in the mid-20th century, particularly in the post-World War II era, and is often associated with functionality and affordability. While praised for its honesty and boldness, it's also been criticized for its unadorned aesthetic and potential for visual harshness.

== Exhibitions ==
There are three main exhibition halls which show the history and process of growing tea, as well as an exhibition about tea leaves. There is also an experience center, Where people can appreciate tea through interactive installations, as well as a museum shop, where visitors can buy tea, And a tea room, where people can taste it. An ecological park and trail exists behind the museum, which features a carp pool, a waterfall, and a tea flower forest. Rare insects and cultivated plant life can also be seen. A statue of the sea goddess Mazu exists in the ecological park.

== Opening time ==
The museum opens everyday from 9 a.m. to 5 p.m. on weekdays and 9.00 a.m. to 5:30 p.m. on weekends. It closes on the first Monday of each month, as well as during the Chinese New Year or during natural disasters.

== Admission fee ==
The museum will reinstitute an entry fee starting on 2016/7/1. The fee is NT$ 80 per person. Residents of New Taipei, those 65 and over or under 12, students, disabled people, low-income earners, and military veterans can enter free.

== Transportation ==
The museum is accessible by buses Green 12 and 923 from the Xindian metro station.

== See also ==
- List of museums in Taiwan
- Tenfu Tea Museum
- Tea Research and Extension Station
