= Pingxi Historical Trail =

Trail in Shuangxi, New Taipei, Taiwan

Coordinates: 24°55′04.7″N 121°50′18.5″E

Pingxi Historical Trail 坪溪古道
- Length: 1.8 km
- Location: Shuangxi, New Taipei, Taiwan
- Use: walking

Pingxi Historical Trail (Chinese: 坪溪古道; pinyin: Píngxī Gǔdào) is a trail in Shuangxi District, New Taipei, Taiwan.

== History ==
Originally, the trail used to be the path for timber transportation. It was widen for logging trucks to passed through.

== Geology ==
The trail follows the paths along Pingxi River for a distance of 1.8 km. It is mostly flat.

== Transportation ==
The trail is accessible by bus from Shuangxi Station of Taiwan Railway.

== See also ==
- Beishi River Historical Trail
- Manyueyuan National Forest Recreation Area
