= Jin Meiling =

Jin Meiling may refer to:

- Birei Kin (born 1934), or Jin Meiling in pinyin, Taiwan-born Japanese critic and political activist
- Meiling Jin (born 1956), Guyanese author
