= Beishi =

Beishi may refer to:

== Locations in mainland China or Taiwan ==
- Beishi District (北市区), Baoding, Hebei
- Beishi River (北勢溪), tributary of the Xindian River in northern Taiwan
- Beishi, Guangning County (北市镇), town in Guangdong
- Beishi, Xingye County (北市镇), town in Guangxi
- Beishi, Gaoping (北诗镇), town in Shanxi

Subdistricts (北市街道)

- Beishi Subdistrict, Lu'an, in Yu'an District, Lu'an, Anhui
- Beishi Subdistrict, Shenyang, in Heping District, Shenyang, Liaoning

== Others ==
- History of Northern Dynasties, or Bei Shi (北史), one of the official Chinese historical works of the Twenty-Four Histories
