= Mudan railway station =

Railway station in New Taipei, Taiwan

Mudan 牡丹車站
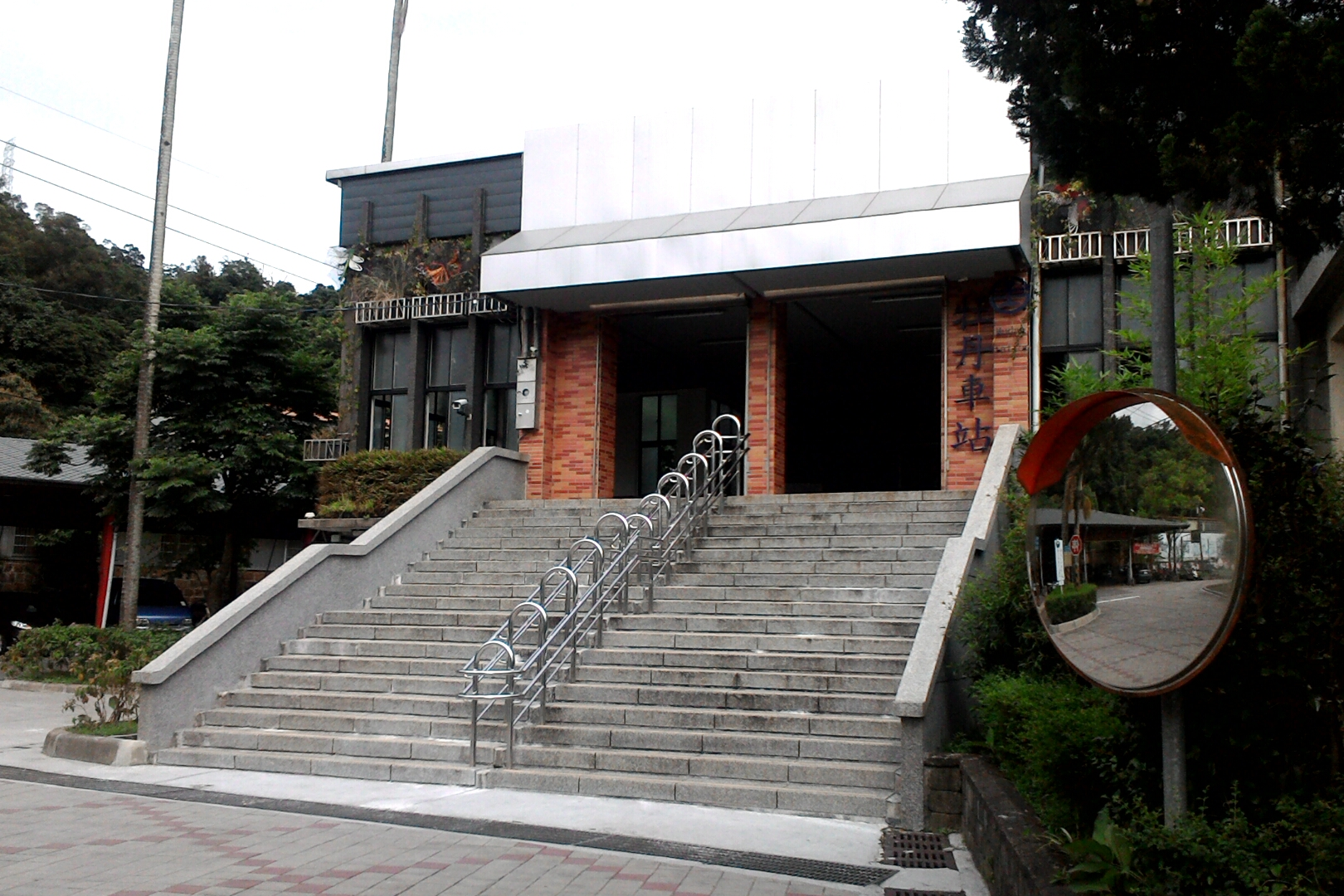

General information
- Location: Shuangxi, New Taipei, Taiwan
- Coordinates: 25°03′30.8″N 121°51′6.8″E
- System: Train station
- Owner: Taiwan Railway Corporation
- Operator: Taiwan Railway Corporation
- Line: Eastern Trunk line
- Train operators: Taiwan Railway Corporation

History
- Opened: 13 September 1922

Passengers
- 489 daily (2024)

Services
Preceding station	Taiwan Railway	Following station
Sandiaoling towards Badu	Eastern Trunk line	Shuangxi towards Taitung
Location

Mudan (Chinese: 牡丹車站; pinyin: Mǔdān Chēzhàn) is a railway station on Taiwan Railway Yilan line located in Shuangxi District, New Taipei, Taiwan.

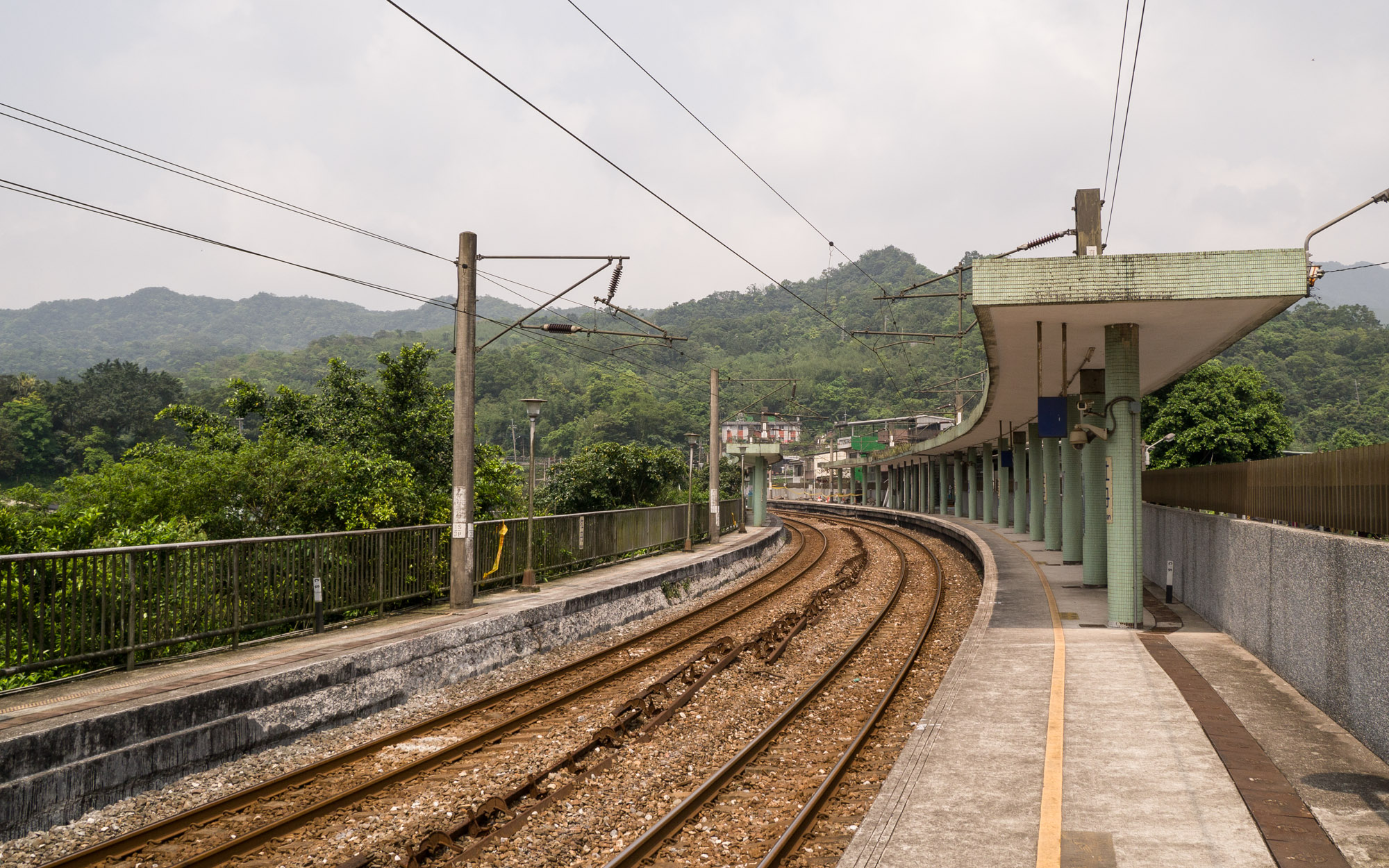
Mudan station platform

== History ==
The station was opened on 13 September 1922.

== Structure ==
The station that has two side platforms.

== See also ==
- List of railway stations in Taiwan
