= Huafan University =

University in New Taipei, Taiwan

Coordinates: 24.982°N 121.690°E

- 華梵大學
- Motto: 德智能仁(Pe̍h-ōe-jī: Tek-tì Lêng-jîn)
- Motto in English: Virtue, Wisdom, Competence and Benevolence
- Type: Private
- Established: 1990
- Founders: Ven. Hiu Wan (曉雲法師)
- Religious affiliation: Buddhist
- President: Tien-Rein Lee (李天任)
- Academic staff: 133
- Undergraduates: 3,188
- Postgraduates: 1,173
- Location: Shiding, New Taipei, Taiwan
- Campus: Suburban
- Website: www.hfu.edu.tw

Huafan University
- Traditional Chinese: 華梵大學
- Simplified Chinese: 华梵大学
Transcriptions
Standard Mandarin
- Hanyu Pinyin: Huáfàn dàxué
Southern Min
- Hokkien POJ: Hôa-hoān Tāi-ha̍k

Huafan University (HFU; Chinese: 華梵大學; Pe̍h-ōe-jī: Hôa-hoān Tāi-ha̍k) is an institute of higher education founded by members of the Buddhist community in Shiding District, New Taipei, Taiwan. The university consists of 4 colleges, 12 departments, 12 graduate institutes, and 5 research centers.

It is located at the top of Dalun Peak, a small mountain in Shiding District.

== History ==
Huafan University was founded in 1990 as the Hua Fan Institute of Technology. In 1993, the name was changed to the Hua Fan College of Humanities, Science and Technology. In 1997, the school was conferred the status of university by the Taiwan Ministry of Education and the name was changed to its current name of Huafan University.

== Faculties ==
- College of Arts and Design
- College of Buddhism
- College of Engineering and Management
- College of Liberal Arts

== University presidents ==
- Yu Jie Ming (于傑民): August 1990 - January 1991
- Guo Rong Zhao (郭榮趙): February 1991 - July 1992
- Tian Bo Yuan (田博元): August 1992 - July 1995
- Ma Xun Jiao (馬遜): August 1995 - July 2005
- Yan Wei Mou (顏維謀): August 2005 - January 2010
- Jue Jien-Ming (朱建民): January 2010 - July 2015
- Kao Poyuan (高柏園): January 2015 -July 2018
- Lee Kao Poyuan (李天任): August 2018 - Current

== International academic exchange ==
Huafan University has academic exchange programs with the following schools:

- United States
  - Lawrence Technological University
  - Morehead State University
  - University of North Carolina at Pembroke
  - Marylhurst University
  - Lewis-Clark State College
  - University of New England
- United Kingdom
  - De Montfort University
- Australia
  - University of Wollongong
  - University of South Australia
- South Korea
  - Uiduk University
  - Geumgang University
- Japan
  - International Buddhist University
- France
  - Paris 8 University

== See also ==
- List of universities in Taiwan
