= Xindian River =

Coordinates: 25.0426°N 121.4840°E

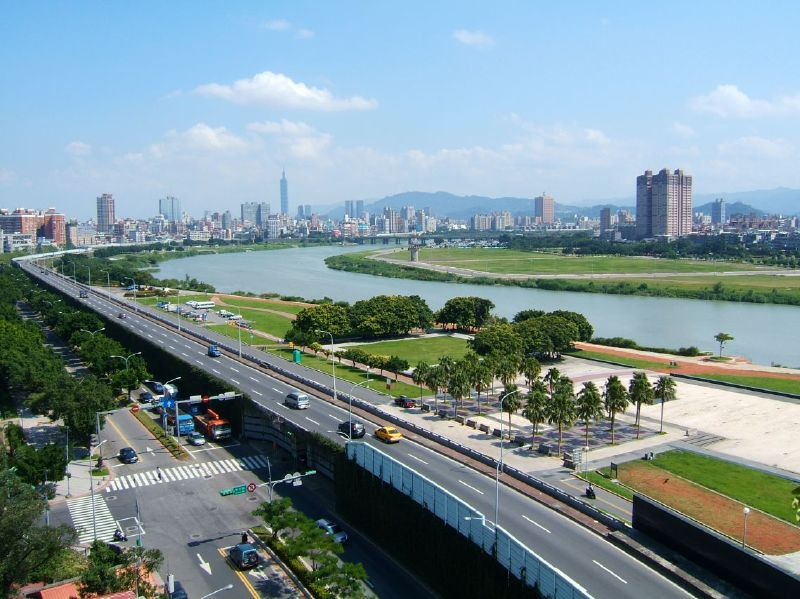
- Xindian River

Location
- Country: Taiwan

Physical characteristics
- Source
  - location: Yingzi Mountain Range
  - elevation: 700 m (2,300 ft)
- Length: 81 km (50 mi)
- Basin size: 921 km^{2} (356 mi^{2})

Basin features
- River system: Tamsui River
- Tributaries
  - left: Nanshi River
  - right: Jingmei River, Beishi River

Xindian River
- Chinese: 新店溪
Transcriptions
Standard Mandarin
- Hanyu Pinyin: Xīndiàn Xī
- Wade–Giles: Hsin^{1}-tien^{4} Hsi^{1}
Southern Min
- Hokkien POJ: Sin-tiàm-khe

The Xindian River (or Xindian Creek) (Chinese: 新店溪) is a river in northern Taiwan. The 82 kilometers (51 mi) Xindian flows through New Taipei and the capital Taipei.

== Overview ==
The Xindian River is one of the three major tributaries of the Tamsui River. Its main tributary is the Beishi River which originates in Shuangxi District, New Taipei City at an elevation of 700 meters (2,300 ft). The Feitsui Dam spans the Beishi southeast of Taipei. It flows west past Xindian before merging with the Nanshi River; it is at this point that it becomes "Xindian River". It then turns north and receives the Jingmei River, before finally merging with the Dahan River and feeding into the Tamsui River.

The river is one of the main sources for drinking water in Taipei City. According to the Taipei City Running Water Center, over 4 million Taipei residents obtain 97% of their drinking water from the river. The first bridge over the river was constructed in 1937 and at 200 meters (660 ft) long connected the areas of Zhonghe and Xindian. On 28 May 1948, a fire broke out on a train crossing the Sindian River Bridge. The fire killed 21 passengers, with an additional 43 presumed dead, and is the deadliest train accident in Taiwanese history. Today, there are 22 bridges that span the river.

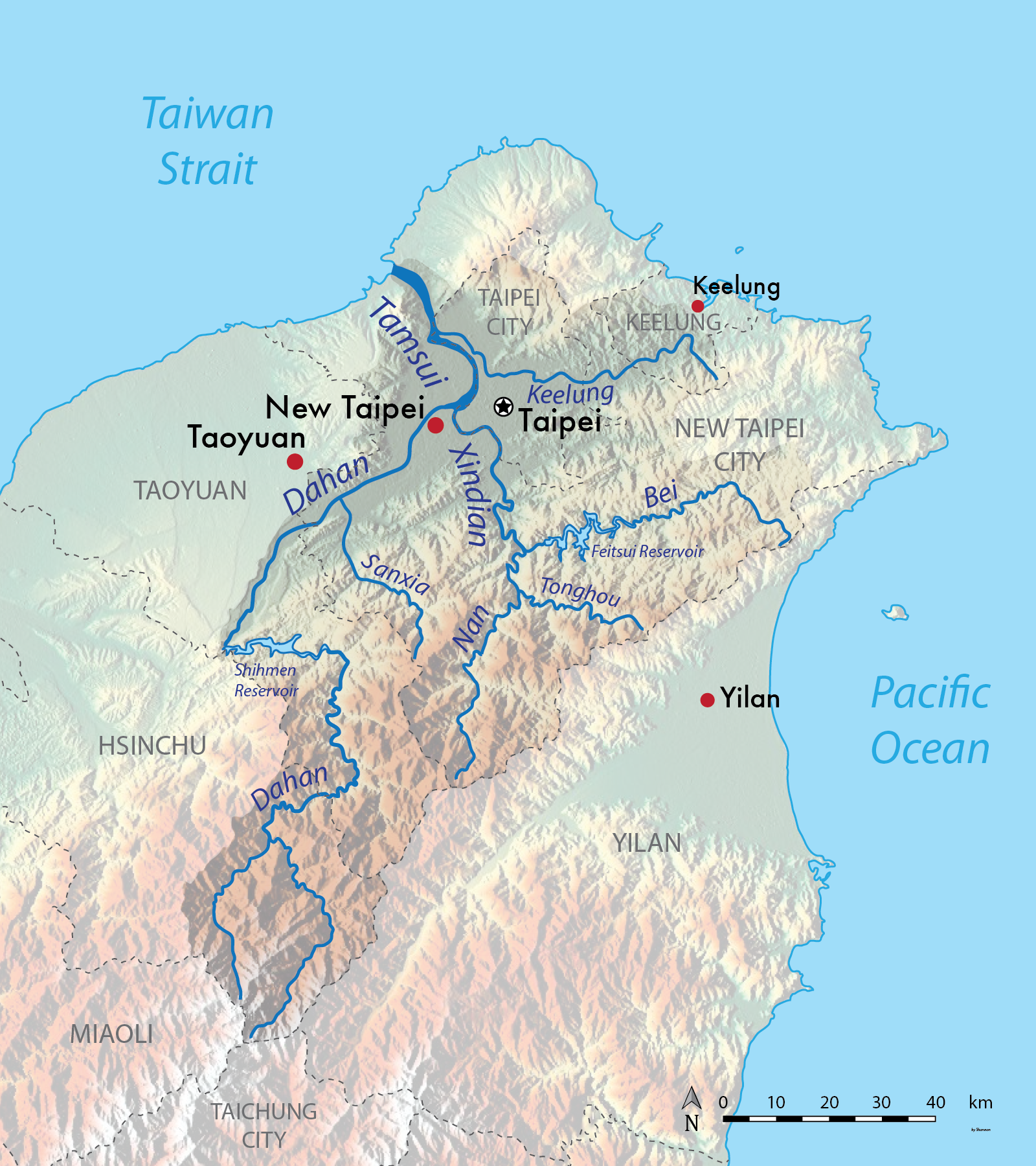
Map showing the location of the Xindian within the Tamsui River watershed

== Pollution ==
The Xindian River is heavily polluted by both raw sewage and industrial pollution from illegal industry. The natural watercourse restoration is on the agenda of the Taipei City Government, Taiwan Central Government and several citizen organizations.

== See also ==
- Tamsui River
- Feitsui Dam
- List of rivers of Taiwan
