= Feicui Dam =

Dam in Shiding, New Taipei, Taiwan

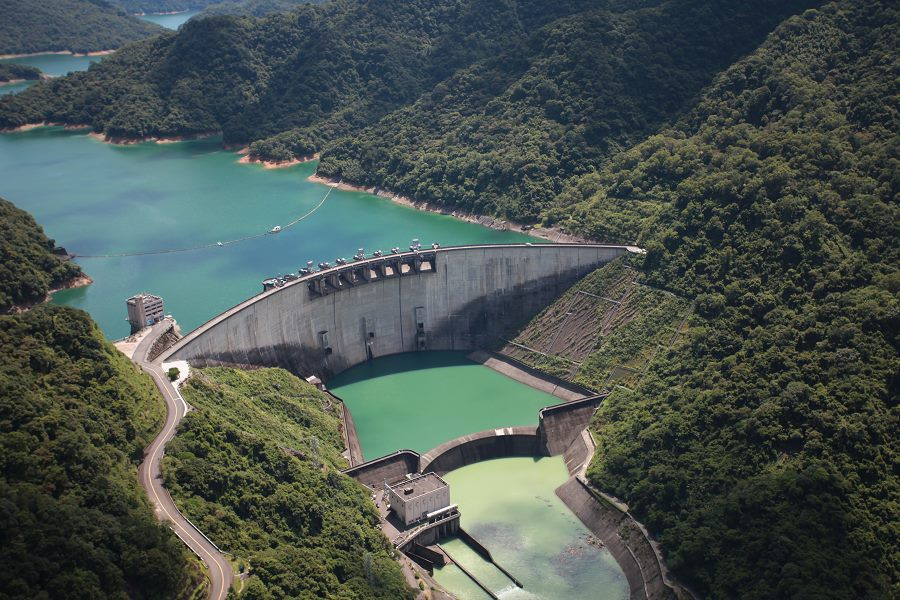
- Feicui dam

- Location within Taiwan
- Official name: 翡翠水壩
- Location: Shiding, New Taipei, Taiwan
- Coordinates: 24°54′33″N 121°34′48″E
- Opening date: June 1987; 39 years ago

Dam and spillways
- Type of dam: Concrete arch
- Impounds: Beishi River
- Height: 122.5 m (402 ft)
- Length: 510 m (1,670 ft)
- Dam volume: 700,000 m^{3} (920,000 yd^{3})

Reservoir
- Creates: Feicui Reservoir （翡翠水庫）
- Total capacity: 460,000,000 m^{3} (372,928 acre⋅ft)
- Active capacity: 335,510,000 m^{3} (272,002 acre⋅ft)
- Catchment area: 303 km^{2} (117 mi^{2})
- Surface area: 10.24 km^{2} (2,530 acres)
- Normal elevation: 170 m (560 ft) max

Gueishan Power Station
- Commission date: 1987
- Type: hydroelectric power
- Hydraulic head: 89 m (292 ft)
- Installed capacity: 70 MW
- Annual generation: 223 GWh

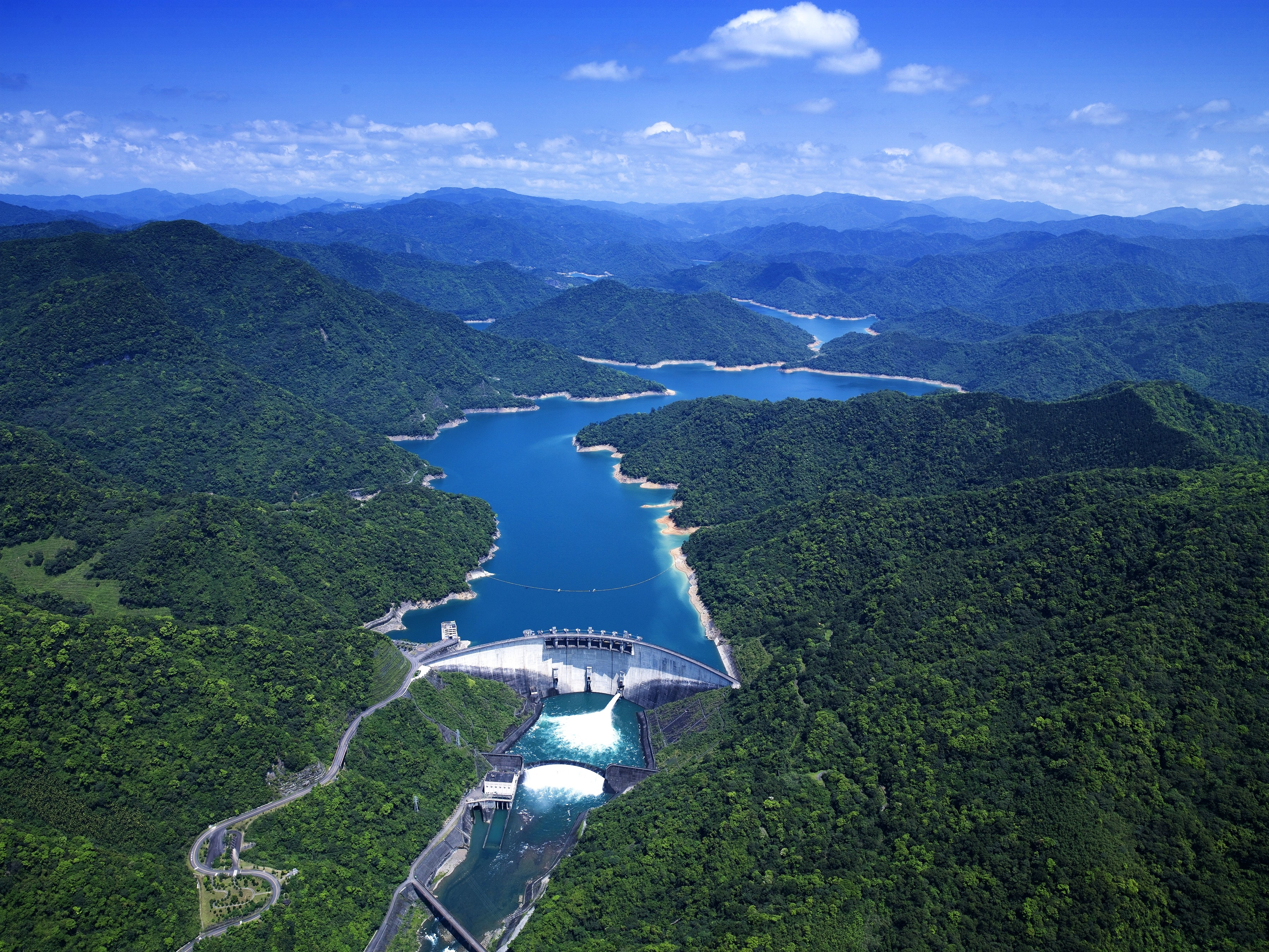
Feicui Dam and reservoir

Feicui Dam (traditional Chinese: 翡翠水壩; simplified Chinese: 翡翠水坝; pinyin: Fěicuì Shuǐbà; Pe̍h-ōe-jī: Húi-chhùi Chúi-pà) is a double curvature concrete arch dam on the Beishi River in Shiding District, New Taipei, Taiwan, forming Feicui Reservoir (翡翠水庫). The dam is located in Shiding District, New Taipei City, and is usually misunderstood as the principal water source for the Greater Taipei area (In fact, the principal water source for the Greater Taipei area is Nanshi River. Feicui Dam, by contrast, is the water source in reserve). The name of the dam and reservoir translates as "emerald lake", in reference to the pure quality of the water. The area is managed by the Taipei Feicui Reservoir Administration. Public access is heavily restricted in order to protect water quality, which is among the highest of Taiwan's reservoirs.

== History ==
The dam was proposed in the 1970s during a period of severe drought in northern Taiwan. The reservoir site was located on the Beishi River, which joins with the Nanshi River to form the Xindian River which flows through New Taipei City. A dam built here would hold back water during the wet season, when the flow in Nanshi River alone is enough to meet water demands, and release water to augment supplies as needed during the dry season.

This dam site was considered favorable because of good soil and forest conditions of the upstream watershed; at the time human development consisted mainly of tea plantations. The quality was much better than the watershed behind Shihmen Dam, the other major water source for greater Taipei, which has suffered crippling sediment issues due to deforestation. In order to preserve the watershed, the Taiwan government relocated residents in upstream areas.

Although the Dam is located in New Taipei, construction was funded by Taipei City, in order to provide water to the capital. Construction began in August 1979 and was completed in June 1987. The dam cost NT$11.4 billion to construct. Today about 46 percent of the water is delivered to Taipei City and 54 percent is used in New Taipei. The service area incorporates about 6.3 million people–a quarter of Taiwan's population.

In 2014, the Feicui Reservoir supplied a total of 344.5 million cubic meters (279,300 acre feet) of water for municipal and industrial uses, or about 944,000 cubic meters (249 million gallons) per day.

== Specifications ==
Feicui Dam is the largest concrete dam in Taiwan. The dam is a three-centered double curvature arch, 122.5 metres (402 ft) tall, 510 metres (1,670 ft) long, and consisting of 703,675 cubic metres (920,372 yd^{3}) of material. The dam crest has an elevation of 172.5 metres (566 ft) above sea level. A forebay dam 33 metres (108 ft) high is located immediately downstream, to reduce erosion from floodwater releases. Located in a seismically active zone, Feitsui Dam is designed to withstand a magnitude 7.0 earthquake.

The Feicui Reservoir has a water storage capacity of 460 million cubic meters (370,000 acre feet) and an active capacity of 335.5 million cubic meters (272,000 acre feet). The reservoir is operated for water supply, with flood control and hydro power generation as secondary purposes. The main purchasers of water are Taipei Water Department and Taiwan Water Corporation. After the Zengwun Reservoir, Feicui is the second biggest lake in Taiwan.

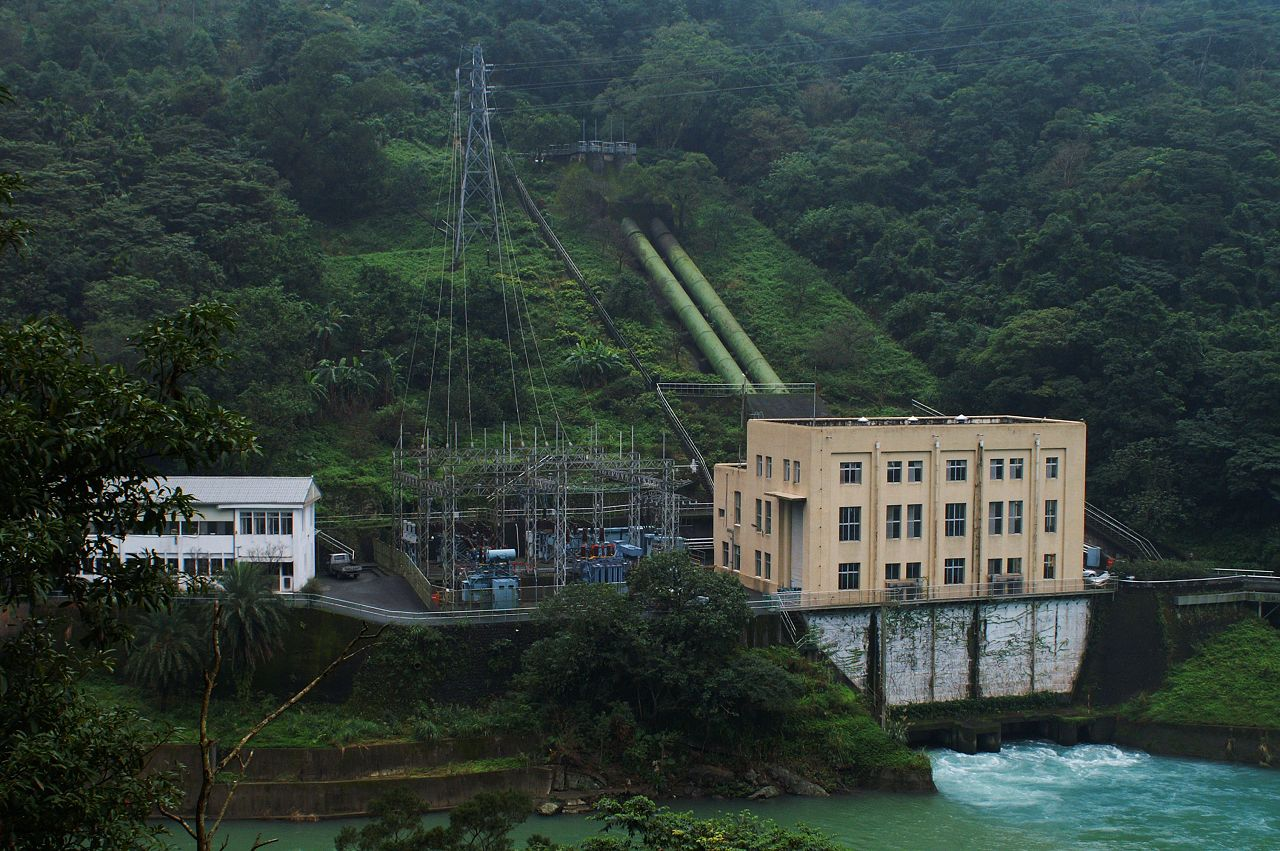
Gueishan Power Plant

Hydroelectricity is produced at the Gueishan Power Station, which has one Francis turbine with a capacity of 70 megawatts. The plant operates under a gross head of 89 metres (292 ft), and the annual power generation is 223 million kilowatt hours. The maximum flow rate is 102 m^{3}/s (3,600 cu ft/s).

Water is released through three sets of gates. The crest spillway is controlled by 8 radial gates, each 9.3 metres (31 ft) high and 14 metres (46 ft) wide. The bottom sluice way is controlled by three fixed wheel gates of 3 by 2.5 metres (9.8 ft × 8.2 ft). There is also a tunnel spillway, consisting of a tunnel 386.13 metres (1,266.8 ft) long and 10 metres (33 ft) wide. With all gates open the dam can release 9,870 cubic metres per second (349,000 cu ft/s) of floodwater.

== Access ==
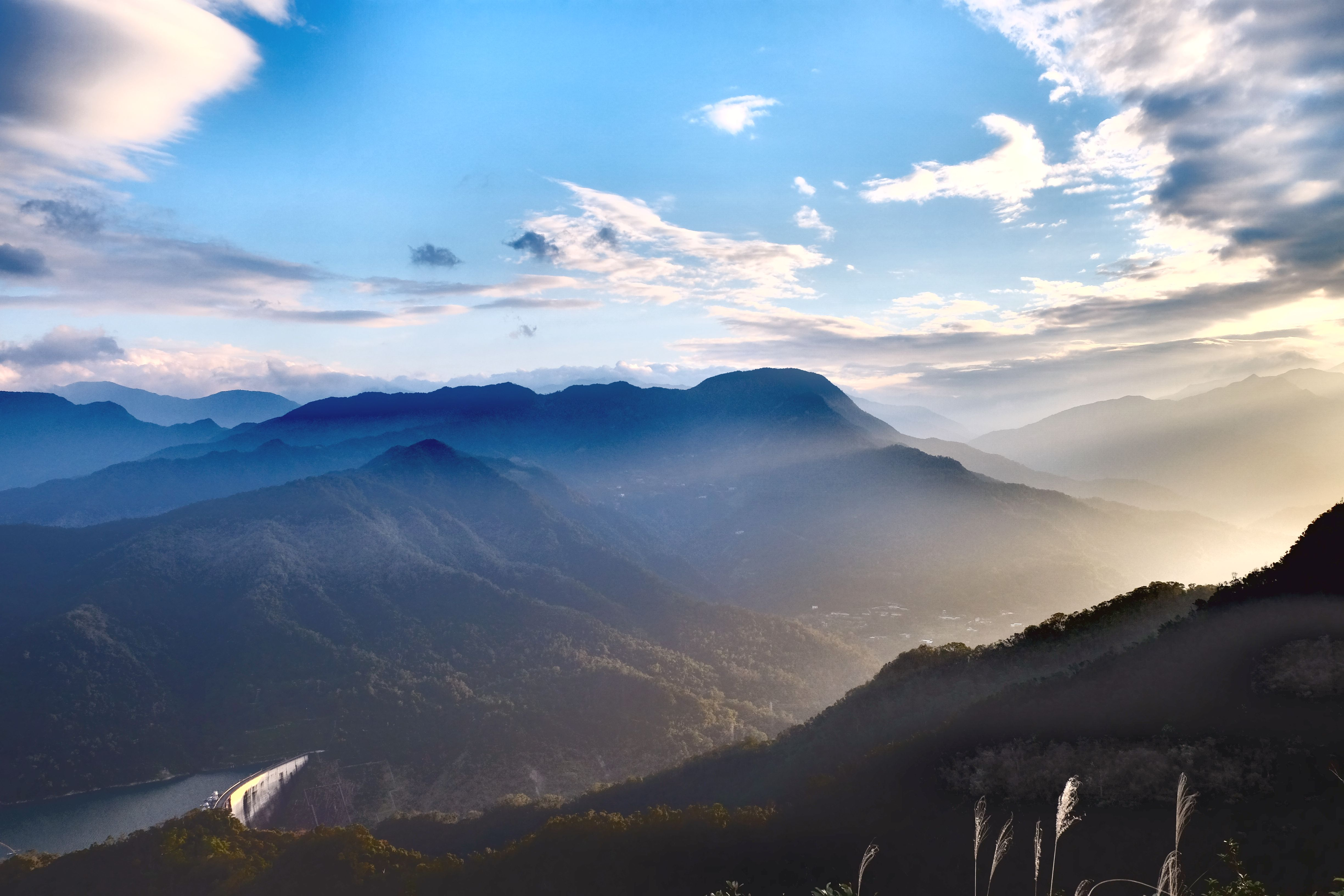
Sunset at the Feitsui Dam

The dam and reservoir are noted for the lack of public access, in order to protect the quality of the drinking water. With the exception of maintenance workers and Taipei City officials, visitation to the dam itself requires a special appointment and must be accompanied by a certified guide. In 2014, a total of 15,798 people toured Feitsui dam compared to 1.7 million people who visited the Shihmen Dam. There are also few, if any designated access and view points on the 15 km (9.3 mi) long Feicui Reservoir. The closest major road is Provincial Highway 9.

== See also ==
- List of dams and reservoirs in Taiwan
- List of power stations in Taiwan
- Electricity sector in Taiwan
