= Hajime Takano =

Japanese journalist

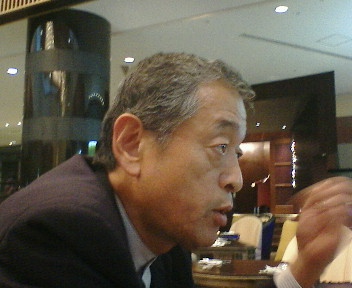
Hajime Takano in 2005

Hajime Takano (高野 孟, Takano Hajime; born April 17, 1944 in Tokyo) is a Japanese journalist, the editor-in-chief for the magazine Insider. He graduated from Waseda University with a major in philosophy and is a former member of the Japan Socialist Party.
