= Masaru Kaneko =

Japanese economist

Masaru Kaneko (金子 勝, Kaneko Masaru; born June 25, 1952) is a Japanese Marxian economist specializing in Institutional economics, public finance and local government finance. He is best known for appearance in TV shows such as Sunday Morning or Asamade nama terebi and authoring several books and newspaper articles. Since 2000, he has been a professor at Keio University.

== Life ==
A native of Tokyo, Kaneko attended the University of Tokyo for both undergraduate and graduate studies.
