= Beishi River =

Coordinates: 24°54′18″N 121°33′26″E

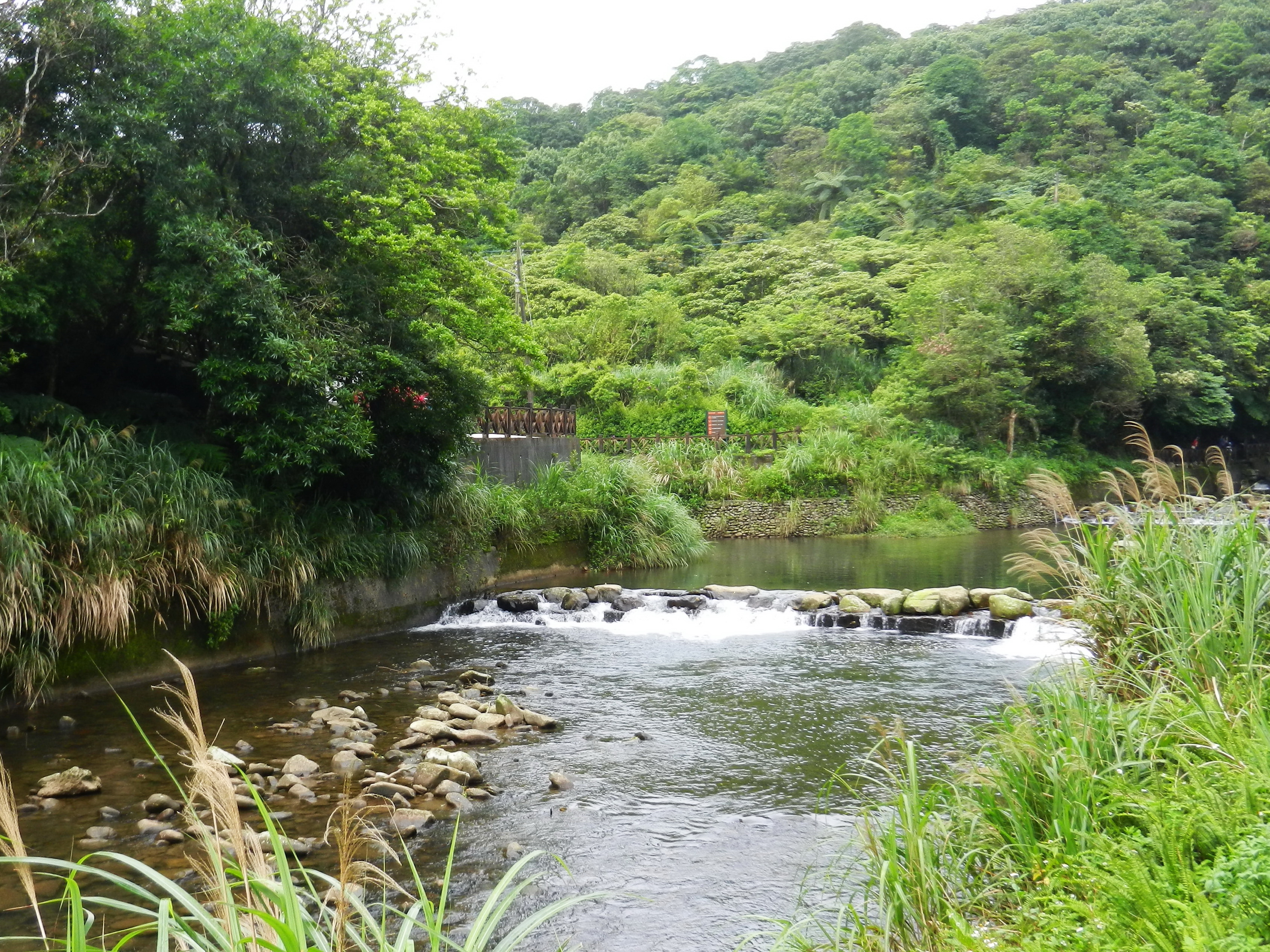
- Native name: 北勢溪 (Chinese)

Location
- Location: Taiwan

Physical characteristics
- Mouth: Xindian River

The Beishi River (Chinese: 北勢溪; Hanyu Pinyin: Běishì Xī; Tongyong Pinyin: Běishìh Si; Wade–Giles: Pei^{3}-shih^{4} Hsi^{1}; Pe̍h-ōe-jī: Pak-sì-khe) is a river in northern Taiwan. It flows through New Taipei City and Yilan County for 50 kilometres (31 mi). It is one of tributaries of Xindian River. The river is impounded by the Fetsui Reservoir in Shiding District, New Taipei City. The Beishi River Historical Trail is a 2.6 kilometre trail, that offers views of the river.

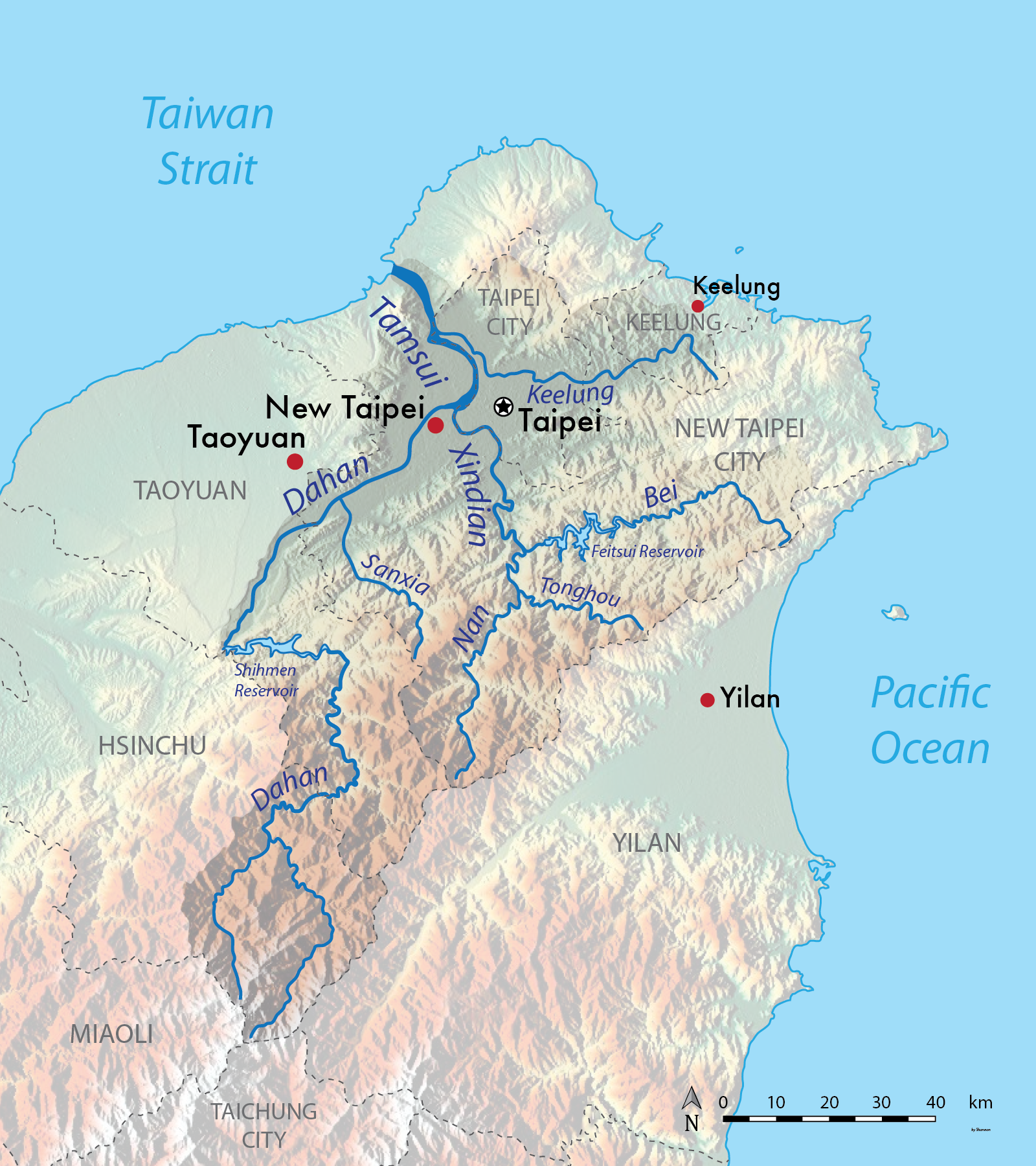
Map showing the location of the Beishi River within the Tamsui River watershed

== See also ==
- List of rivers in Taiwan
- Nanshi River
