= Shuangxi railway station =

Railway station in Shuangxi, New Taipei, Taiwan

Shuangxi Station 雙溪車站
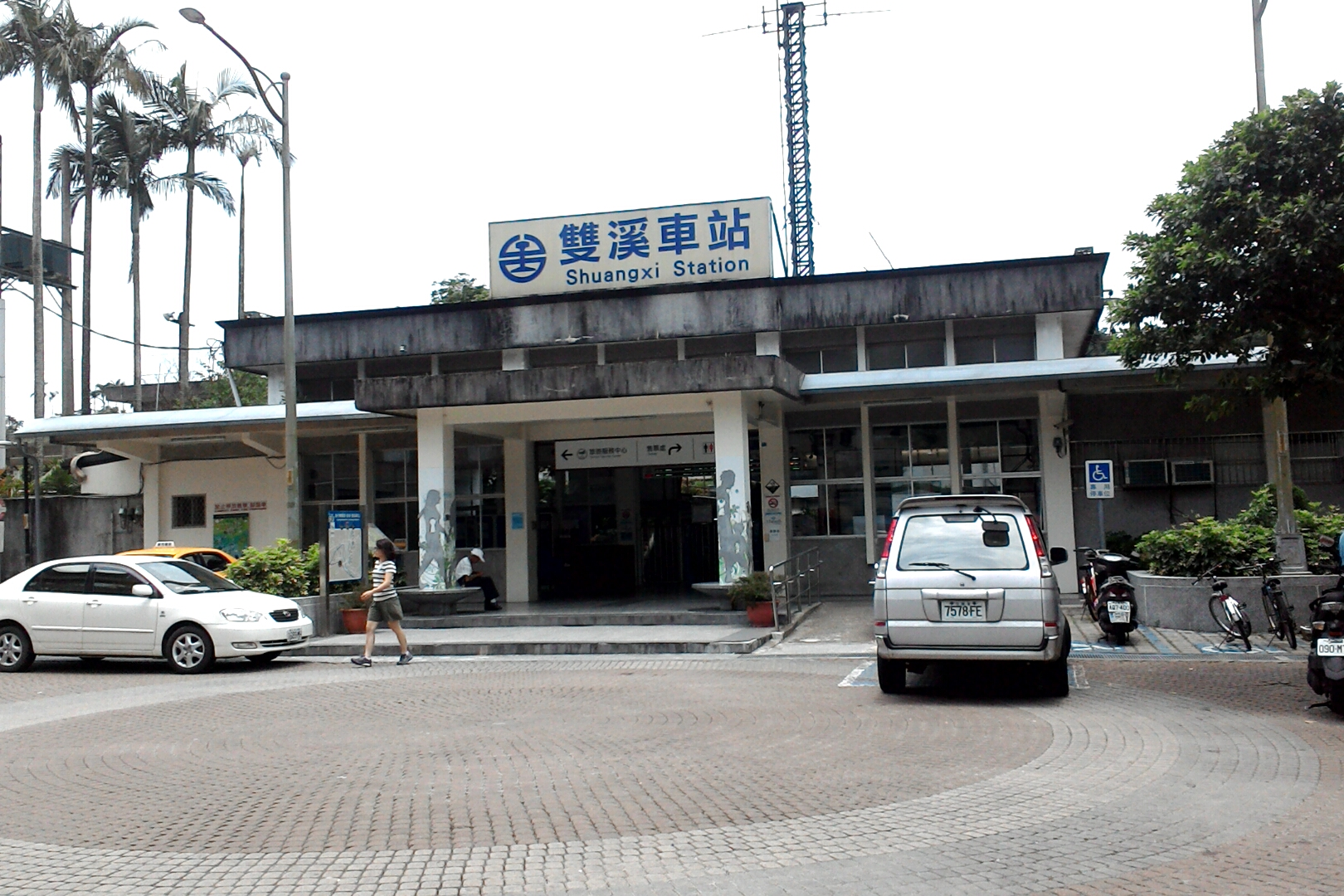

General information
- Location: Shuangxi, New Taipei, Taiwan
- Coordinates: 25°02′19.6″N 121°51′59.8″E
- System: Train station
- Owner: Taiwan Railway Corporation
- Operator: Taiwan Railway Corporation
- Line: Eastern Trunk line
- Train operators: Taiwan Railway Corporation

History
- Opened: 30 November 1924

Passengers
- 1,611 daily (2024)

Services
Preceding station	Taiwan Railway	Following station
Mudan towards Badu	Eastern Trunk line	Gongliao towards Taitung
Location
- Location within Taiwan

Shuangxi (Chinese: 雙溪車站; pinyin: Shuāngxī Chēzhàn) is a railway station on Taiwan Railway Yilan line. It is located in Shuangxi District, New Taipei, Taiwan.

== History ==
The station was opened on 30 November 1924.

== See also ==
- List of railway stations in Taiwan
