= Shuangxi District =

District in New Taipei, Taiwan

Shuangxi 雙溪區 Sōkei
- District
- Shuangxi District
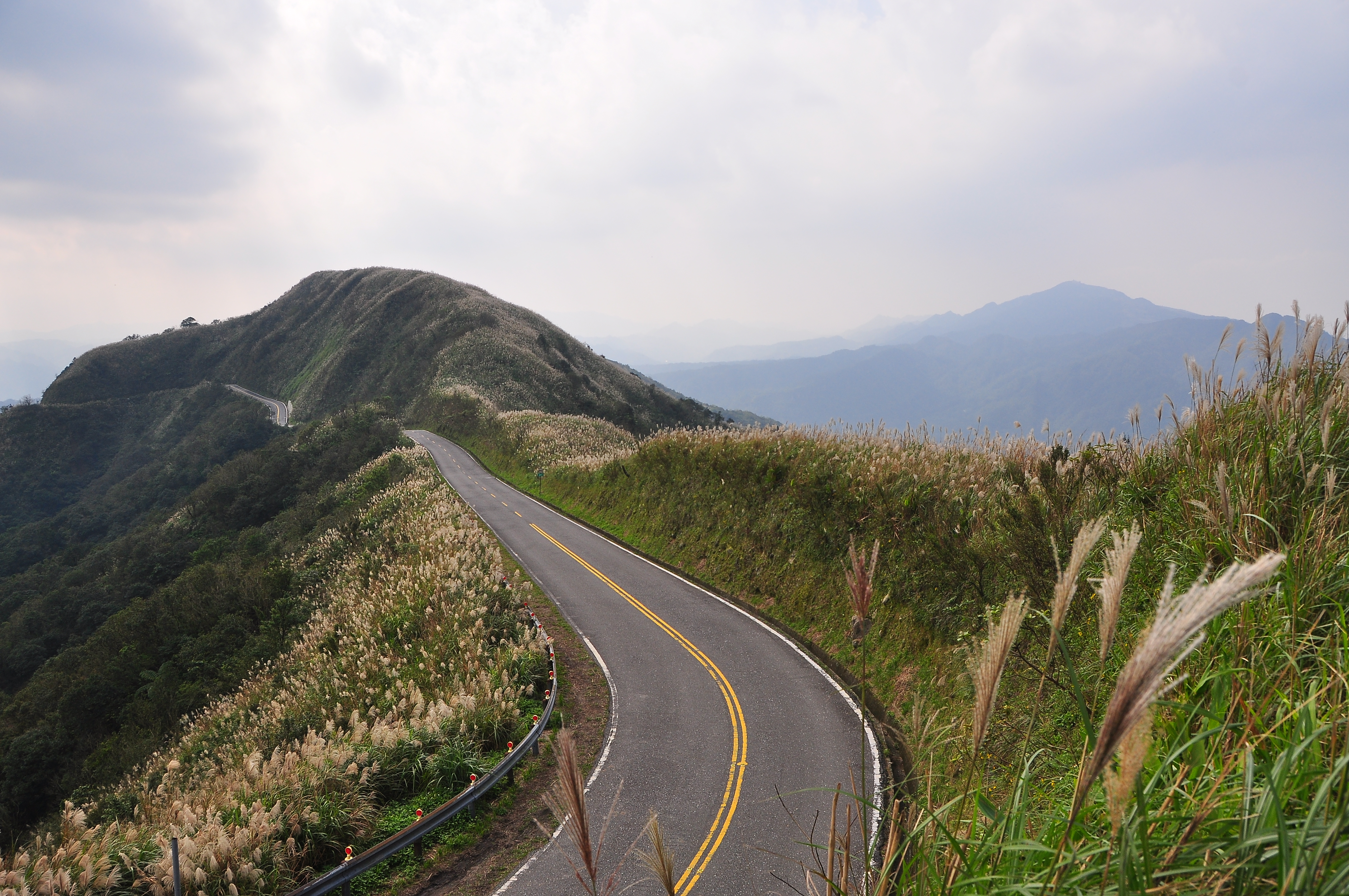
- Views on City Highway 102 in Shuangxi District

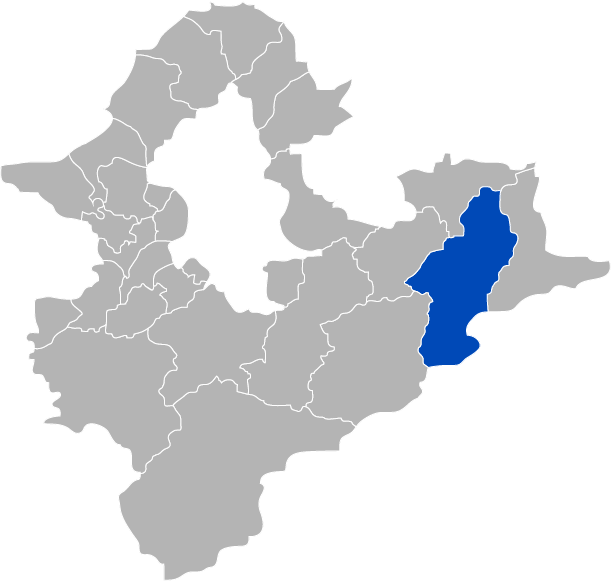
- Shuangxi District in New Taipei City
- Coordinates: 025°00′35″N 121°50′03″E
- Country: Republic of China (Taiwan)
- Special municipality: New Taipei City

Area
  - Total: 146.25 km^{2} (56.47 sq mi)

Population (March 2023)
  - Total: 8,040
- Time zone: +8
- Website: www.shuangxi.ntpc.gov.tw (in Chinese)

Shuangxi District (Chinese: 雙溪區; Hanyu Pinyin: Shuāngxī Qū; Tongyong Pinyin: Shuangsi Cyu) is a rural district in the eastern part of New Taipei City, Taiwan.

== Tourist attractions ==
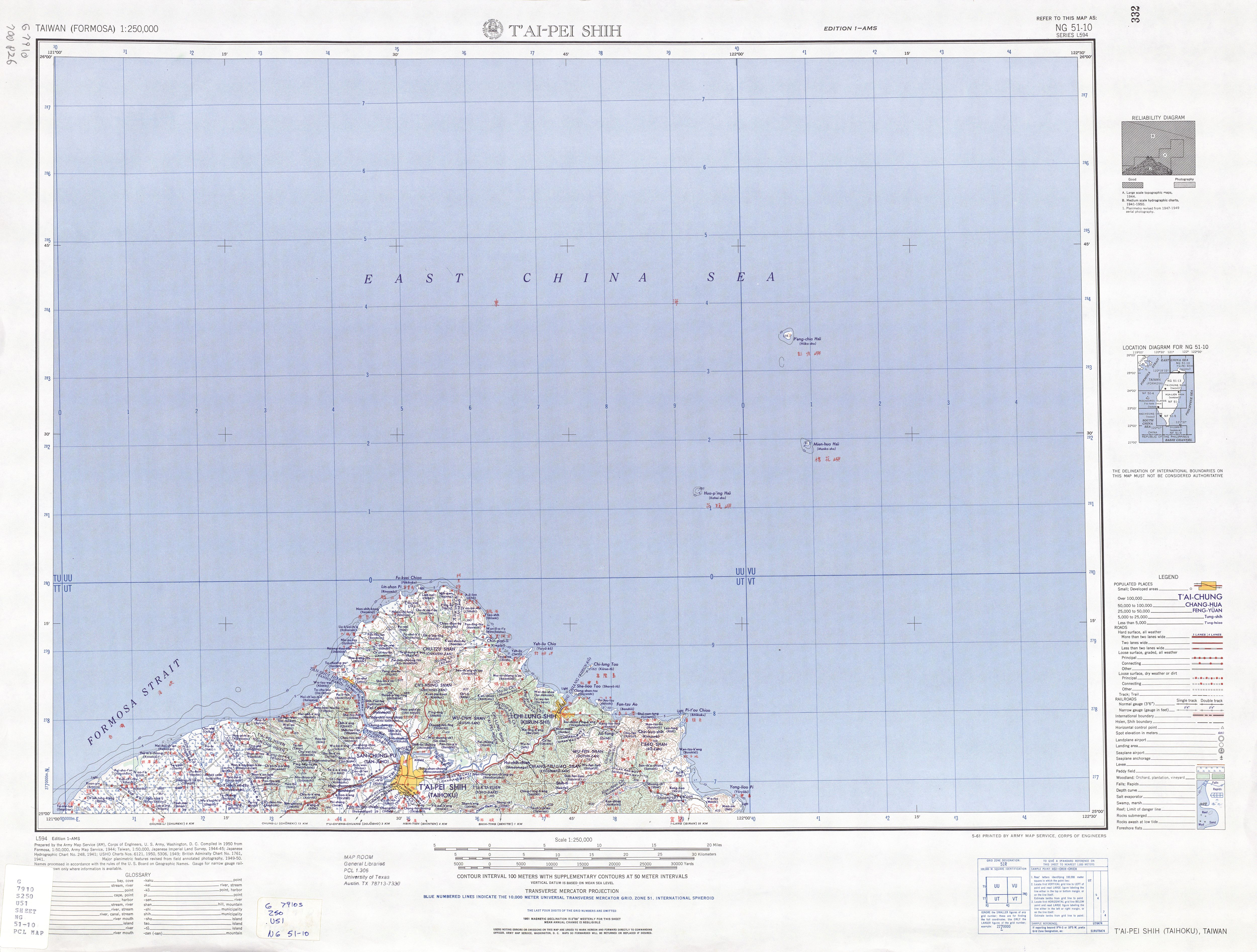
Map including Shuangxi (labeled as Shuang-ch’i (Sōkei) 雙溪) (1950)

- Beishi River Historical Trail
- Pingxi Historical Trail
- Buyan Pavilion
- Shuangxi Sanzhong Temple
- Shuangxi Old Street

== Transportation ==
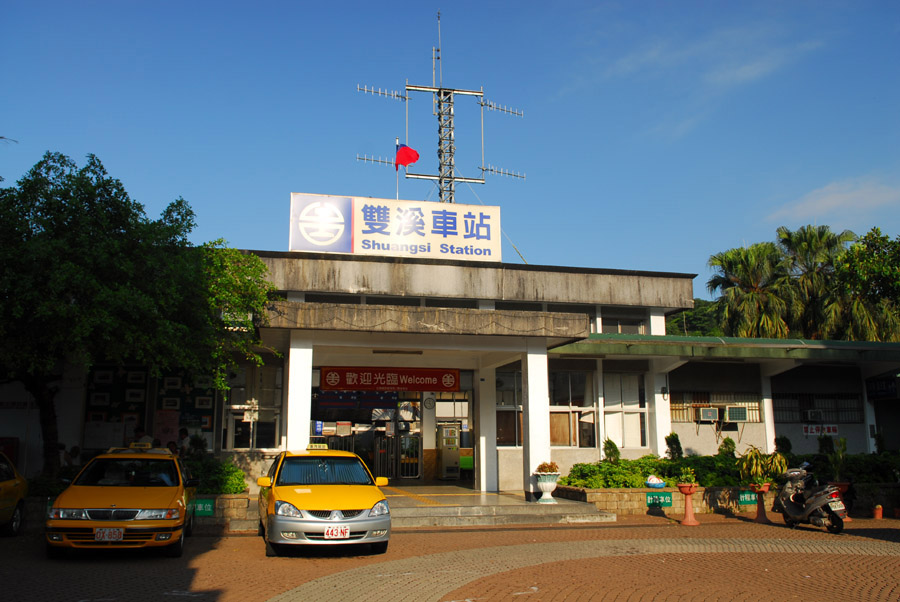
Shuangxi Station

- TR Mudan Station
- TR Shuangxi Station

== See also ==
- New Taipei City
