= Nanshi River =

Coordinates: 24.9023°N 121.5565°E

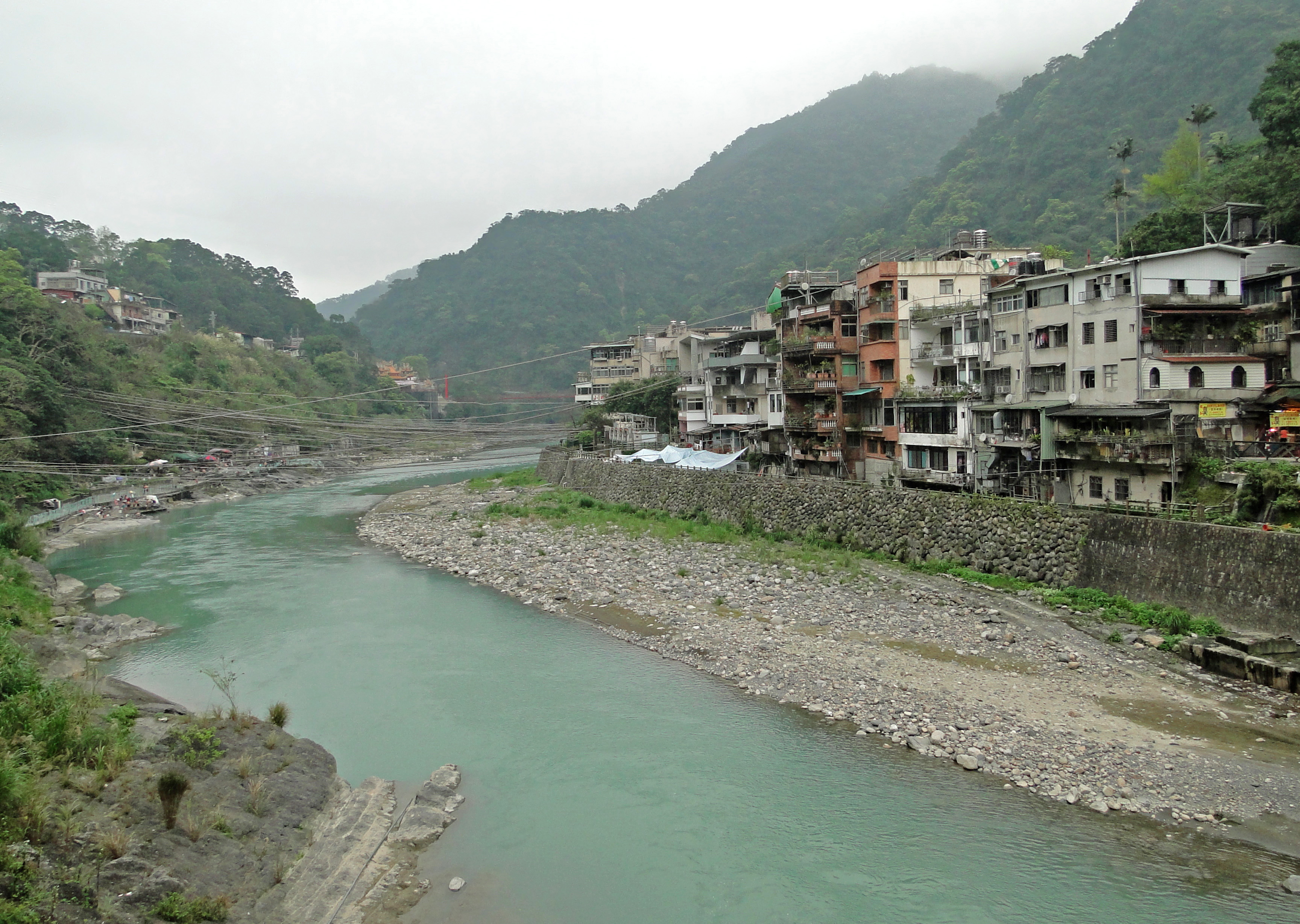
- Nanshi River at Wulai
- Native name: 南勢溪 (Chinese)

Location
- Location: Taiwan

Physical characteristics
- Mouth: Xindian River
  - location: Xindian District
- Length: 45 km (28 mi)

The Nanshi River (Chinese: 南勢溪; Hanyu Pinyin: Nánshì Xī; Tongyong Pinyin: Nánshìh Si; Pe̍h-ōe-jī: Lâm-sì-khe; DT: Lamsiw kev) is a river in Taiwan. The river is governed by Water Management Office of Taipei City Government overseen by the Water Resources Agency.

== Geography ==
The river flows through Wulai District and Xindian District of New Taipei City and Yilan County for 45 km. It is one of the tributaries of Xindian River. At Guishan, Xindian, it combines with Beishi River to form Xindian River. There are many public hot springs along the river banks.

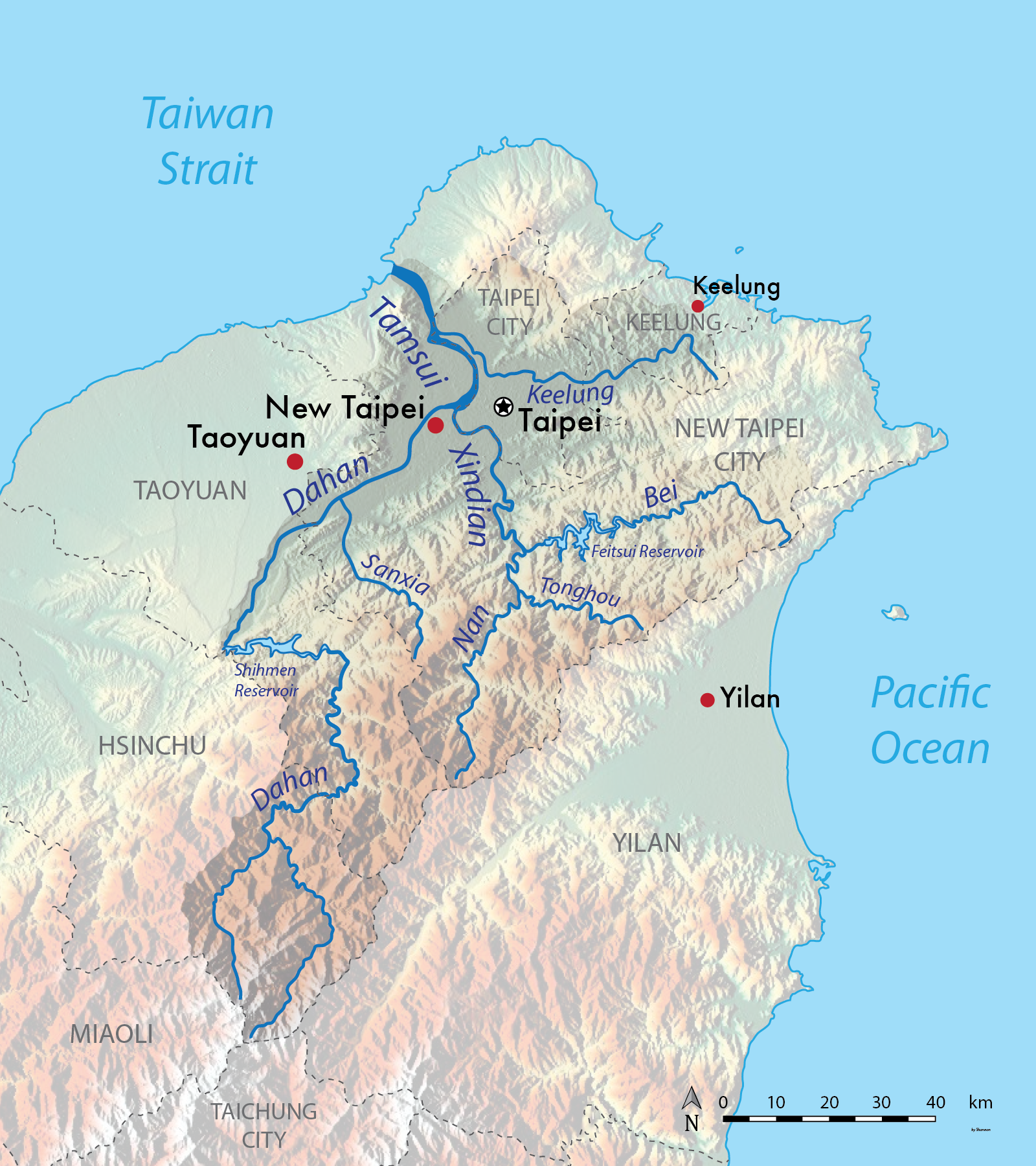
Map showing the location of the Nanshi River within the Tamsui River watershed

== See also ==
- List of rivers in Taiwan
- Beishi River
- Wulai Waterfall
