= Baozhong tea =

Lightly oxidized oolong tea

Baozhong
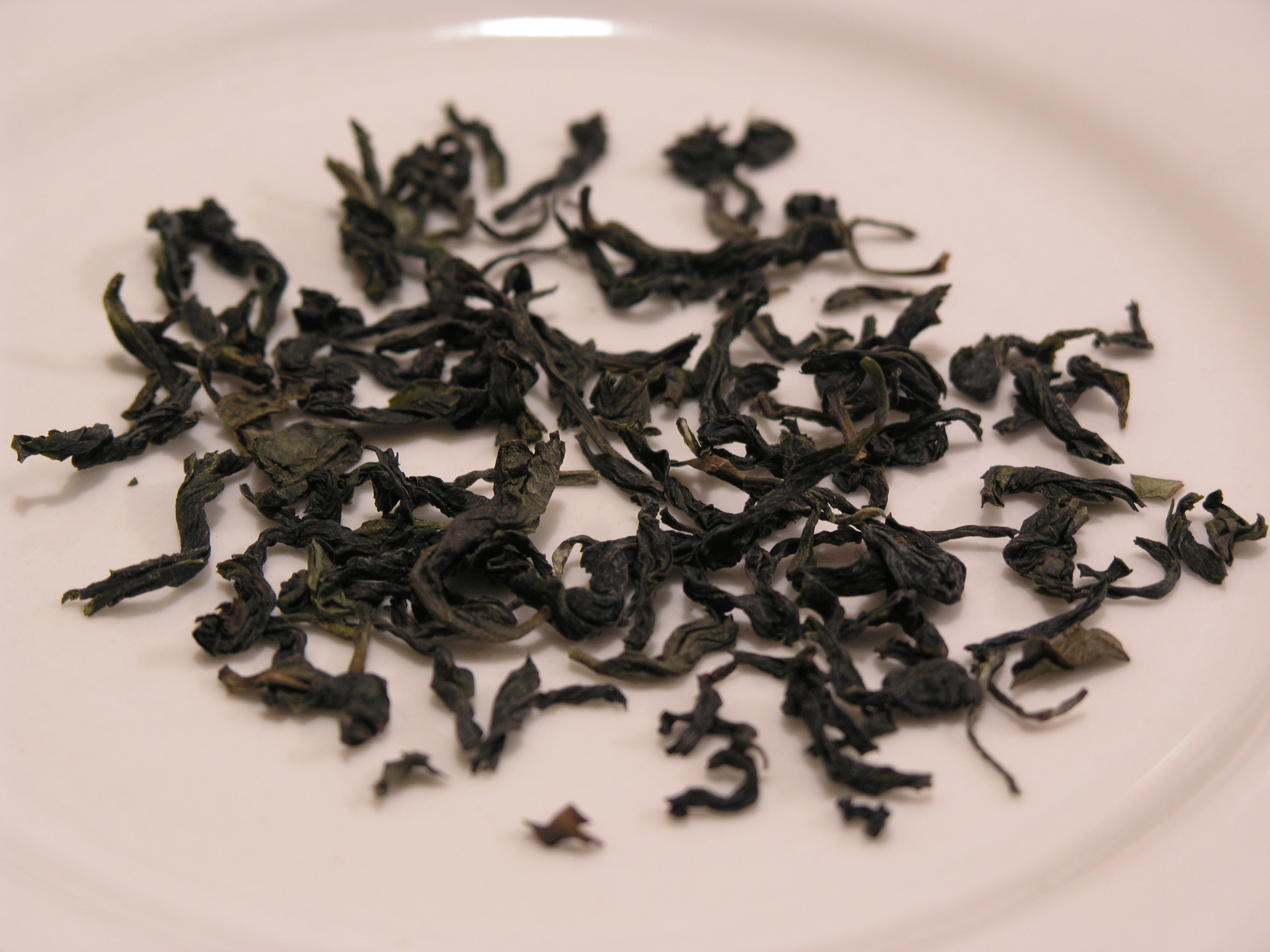
- Type: Between green and oolong
- Other names: Pouchong
- Origin: Fujian, China
- Quick description: Acidic floral fragrance; rich, mild melony taste

Baozhong tea
- Chinese: 包種茶
- Literal meaning: Wrapped kind
Transcriptions
Standard Mandarin
- Hanyu Pinyin: Bāozhǒngchá
Southern Min
- Hokkien POJ: Pau-chióng-tê

Baozhong tea, sometimes romanized as pouchong, is a lightly oxidized tea, twist shape, with floral notes, and usually not roasted, somewhere between green tea and what is usually considered oolong tea, though often classified with the latter due to its lack of the sharper green tea flavours. It is produced mainly in Fujian, China and in Pinglin District, New Taipei, Taiwan.

Its name in Chinese, literally 'the wrapped kind', refers to a practice of wrapping the leaves in paper during the drying process that has largely been discontinued due to advancement in tea processing. At its best, baozhong gives off a floral and melon fragrance and has a rich, mild taste. The picking season of this famous Taiwan "spring tea" (春茶) usually begins around the end of March.

== History ==
Before 1873, oolong tea was widely sold in mainland China and Taiwan, but after an economic slump, some tea companies stopped selling oolong tea because of decreasing demand. At this time, tea companies moved production from Taiwan to Fuzhou and began producing baozhong tea. Baozhong tea is referred to as "flower tea" because of its fragrant smell.

== Health benefits ==
Together with green tea, oolong tea, and black tea, baozhong tea has been shown to have antioxidant activity and antimutagenic properties. Tea catechins are important antioxidants and one study found baozhong tea to have over three times the amount of these compounds relative to black tea, although it was found to have less than green or oolong teas.

== Baozhong tea in Taiwan ==
Farmers from Taiwan imported trees and growing techniques from Fujian during the nineteenth century. The name of baozhong tea means 'wrapped' tea and refers to the former paper package style. The most popular kinds of baozhong tea are from the Nankang and Wenshan regions. It has been produced since about 1885, but today very little is grown. Wenshan Baozhong Tea is also one of the ten most popular teas in Taiwan.

== Characteristics ==
The appearance of baozhong tea is similar to a rope and is curled up. It has a deep green color with tiny grayish white spots. The oxidation is between 8 and 12%. It has a delicate fragrance similar to fresh flowers. The taste is not harsh and its sweet flavor has a moisturizing effect.
