= Shiding District =

District in New Taipei, Taiwan

Shiding 石碇區 Sekitei
- District
- Shiding District
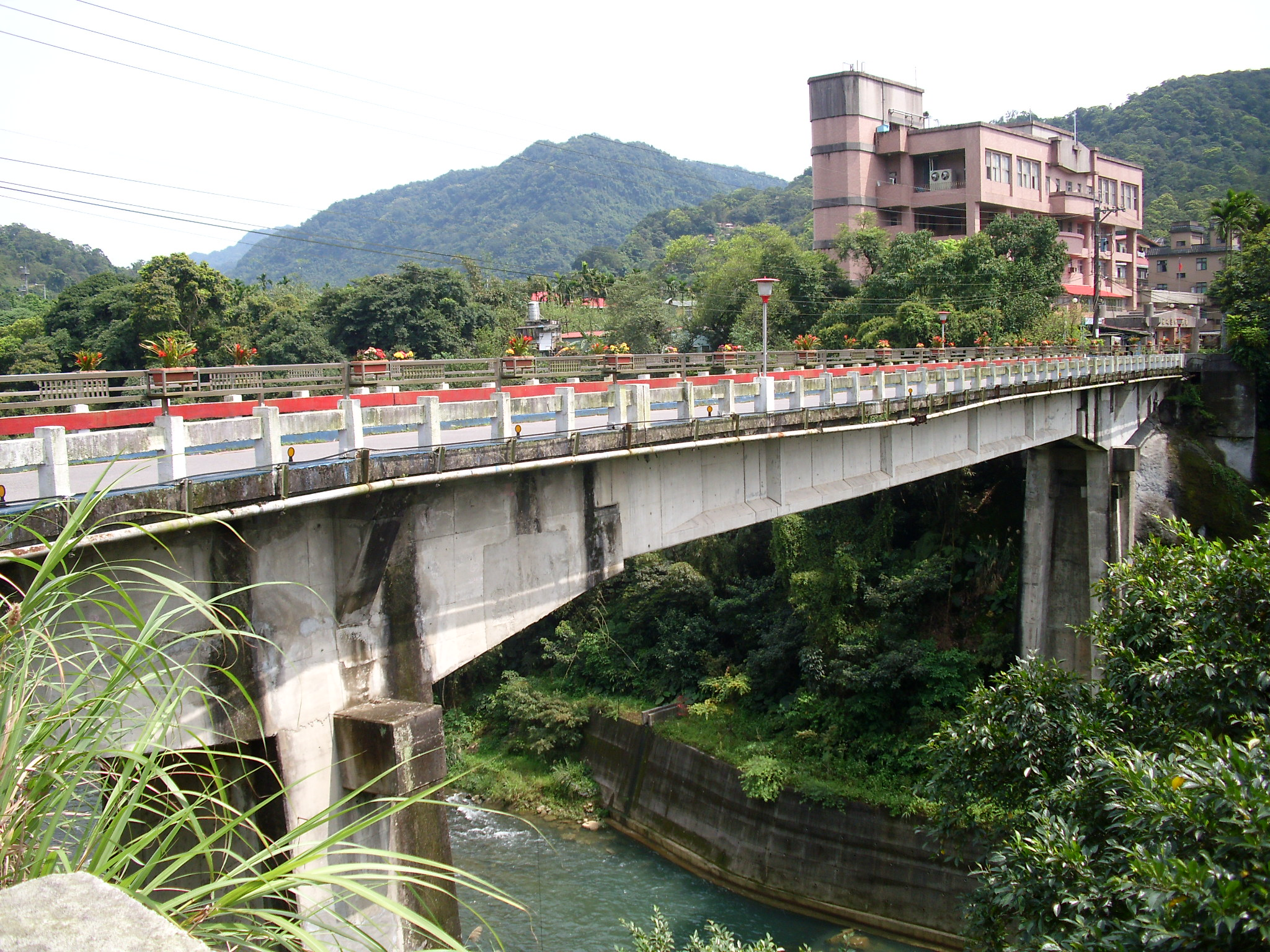

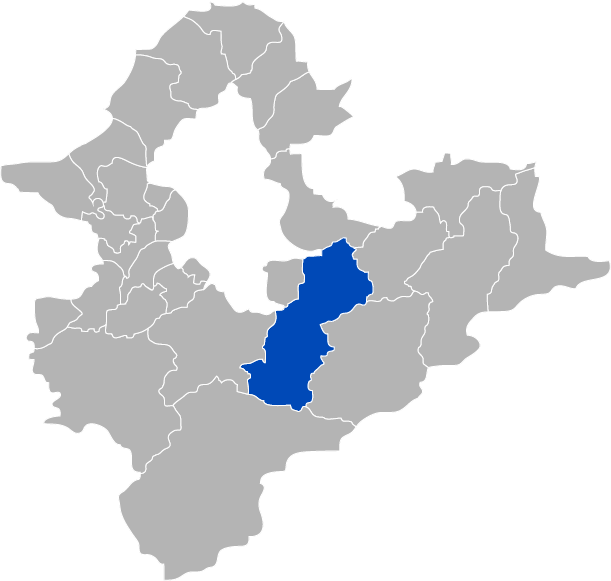
- Shiding District in New Taipei City
- Coordinates: 025°00′N 121°39′E
- Country: Republic of China (Taiwan)
- Special municipality: New Taipei City

Population (March 2023)
  - Total: 7,251
- Time zone: +8
- Website: www.shiding.ntpc.gov.tw (in Chinese)

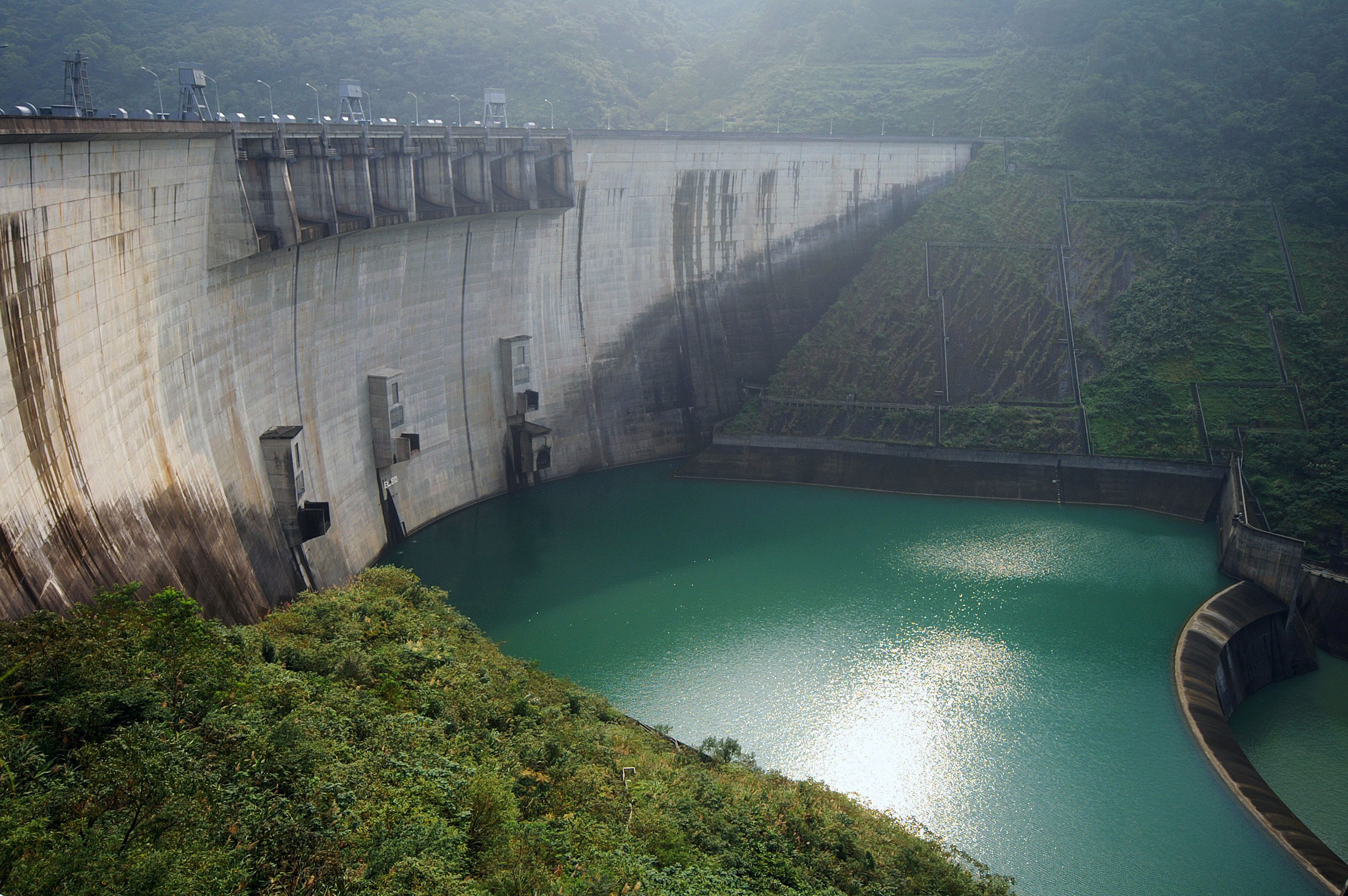
Feitsui Dam

Shiding District (Chinese: 石碇區; Hanyu Pinyin: Shídìng Qū; Tongyong Pinyin: Shíhdìng Cyu; lit. 'stone anchor') is a rural district in southern New Taipei City, Taiwan.

== History ==
Shiding used to be a thriving town during the Qing Dynasty due to its geographically favorable condition as a resting place on the way to Yilan and its coal mine resources and tea trading. Shiding was a rural township of Taipei County until the upgrade of the county to become the New Taipei municipality on 25 December 2010, Shiding became a district.

== Geography ==
- Area: 144.35 km^{2}
- Population: 7,251 people (March 2023)

== Education ==
- Huafan University
- New Taipei Municipal ShiDing High School

== Tourist attractions ==
- Huafan Culture Gallery
- Lumantan Forest Bath
- Putty Painting House
- Shiding Danlan Culture Hall
- Shiding East Street
- Shiding West Street

== Transportation ==
The district is accessible by bus from Jingmei Station of Taipei Metro.
