= Lishan Constructing Administrative Bureau =

Lishan Constructing Administrative Bureau 梨山建設管理局
- Administrative Bureau of Taiwan
- 1973–1981
- Capital: Lishan
- History
  - Established: 1 July 1973
  - Disestablished: 1 May 1981
- Political subdivisions: 2 villages
Preceded by	Succeeded by
Taichung County	Taichung County
- Today part of: Heping, Taichung (Lishan Village and Pingteng Village)

Lishan Constructing Administrative Bureau (Chinese: 梨山建設管理局; Pe̍h-ōe-jī: Lê-san Kiàn-siat Koán-lí-kio̍k) was a county level administrative body in Taiwan between 1973 and 1981.

== History ==
In early years, Lishan was a tribe of Atayal people, named Slamaw in Atayal language. It was administered by Tōsei District, Taichū Prefecture in the Japanese era, and by Hoping Township, Taichung County after World War II. In 1960s, opening of the Central Cross-Island Highway brought agricultures of high return Temperate fruit. This made Lishan one of the richest region in Taiwan at that time.

- July 11, 1967, Lishan Region Constructing Commission (梨山地區建設委員會) was established under the Department of Civil Affairs, Taiwan Provincial Government.
- July 1, 1973, Lishan Constructing Administrative Bureau was established as a county level division within Taiwan Province.
- May 1, 1981, the bureau was reformed as Lishan Scenic Area Administrative Office (梨山風景特定區管理所) under the Department of Transportation, Taiwan Provincial Government.

Currently it is called Lisan Administrative Office (梨山管理站) within the Tri-Mountain National Scenic Area managed by Tourism Bureau, Ministry of Transportation and Communications.

== Administration ==
The Magistrate of Lishan Constructing Administrative Bureau was appointed by the Taiwan Provincial Government. All budgets of the bureau were directly from the provincial government. However, the resident in the territory of the bureau elected legislators to supervise officials and budget of the bureau in Taichung County Council and Hoping Township Council quoting the precedence of Yangmingshan Administrative Bureau.

== Division hierarchy ==
Time		Before July 1973	July 1973 – May 1981	May 1981 – Dec 2010	Dec 2010 – present
Hierarchy	1st	Taiwan Province			Taichung City
Hierarchy	2nd	Taichung County	Lishan Constructing; Administrative Bureau	Taichung County	Taichung City
Hierarchy	3rd	Hoping Rural Township	Lishan Constructing; Administrative Bureau	Hoping Rural Township	Heping District
Hierarchy	4th	Lishan Rural Village; Pingteng Rural Village			Lishan Urban Village; Pingdeng Urban Village

== See also ==
- Yangmingshan Administrative Bureau
- Taichung
