= National scenic area =

Conservation designation

A national scenic area (NSA) is a conservation designation used in several countries.

== Taiwan ==
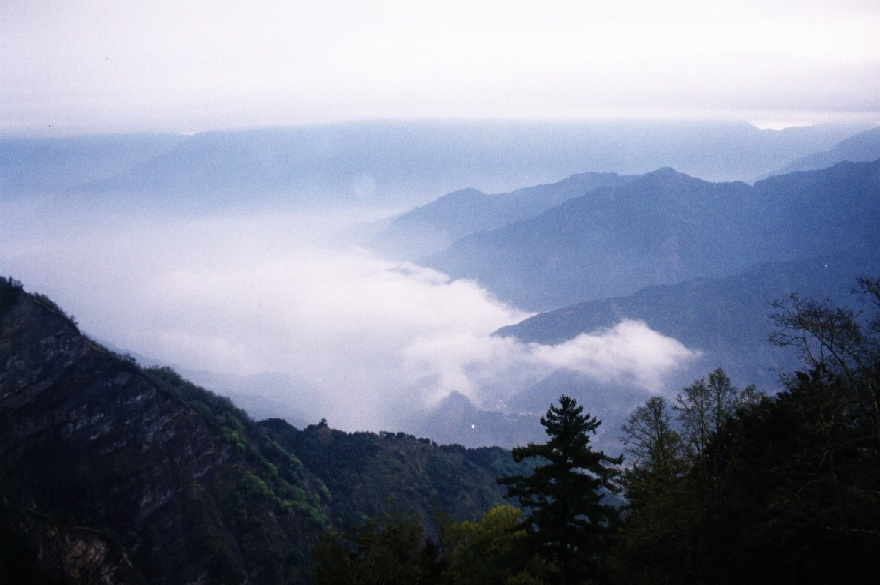
Alishan National Scenic Area

Some of the national scenic areas in Taiwan are:

- Alishan National Scenic Area in Chiayi County
- Maolin National Scenic Area in Kaohsiung City and Pingtung County
- Northeast and Yilan Coast National Scenic Area in New Taipei City and Yilan County
- Penghu National Scenic Area in Penghu County
- Siraya National Scenic Area in Chiayi County and Tainan City
- Southwest Coast National Scenic Area in Chiayi County, Tainan City and Yunlin County

== United Kingdom ==
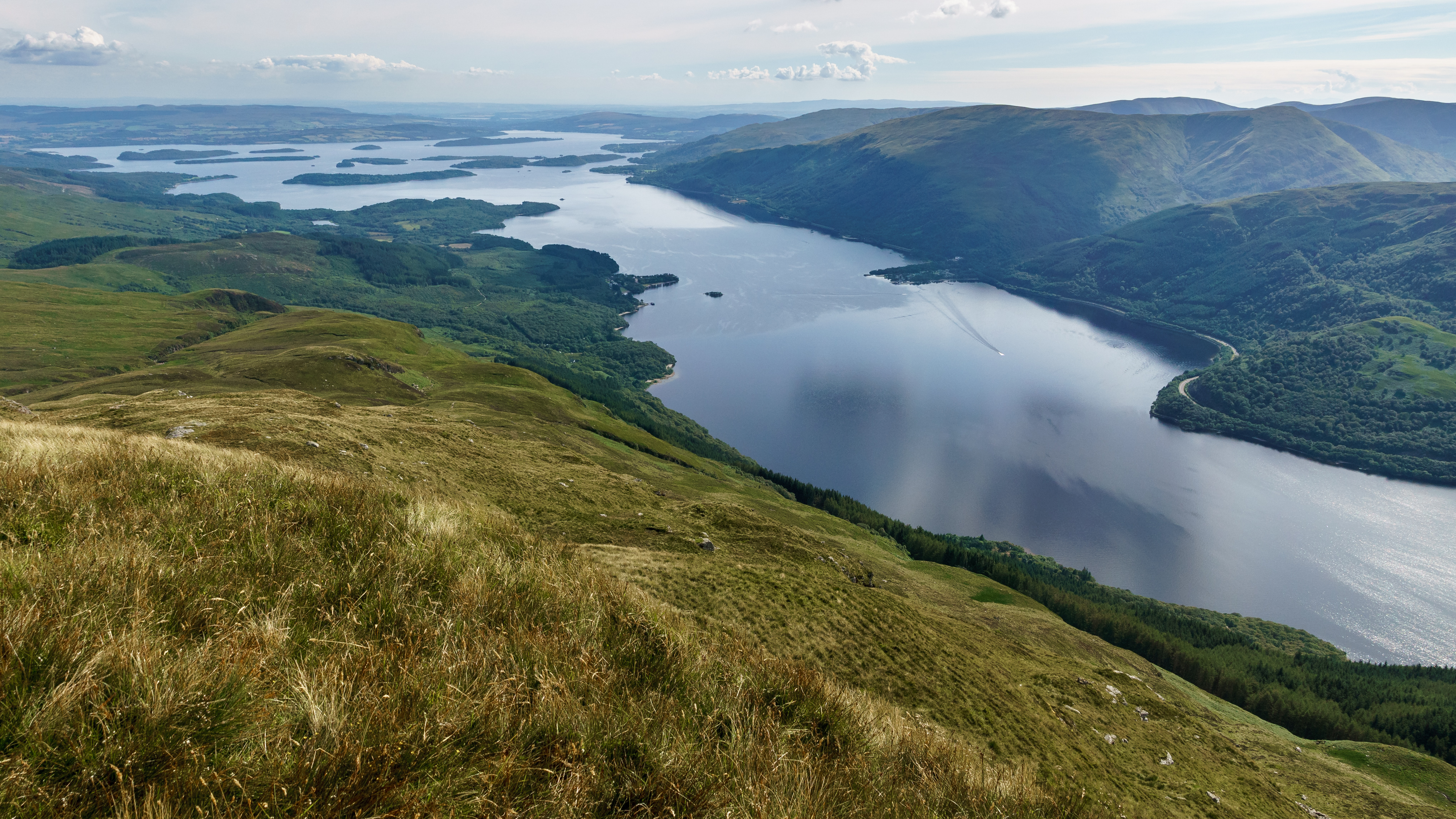
Loch Lomond, one of Scotlands 40 NSAs

In Scotland national scenic areas (NSAs) are defined as areas having outstanding scenic interest or unsurpassed attractiveness. They are administered by NatureScot. There are 40 designated NSAs in Scotland, covering 13% of the country's land area. The primary purpose of the NSA designations is to conserve and enhance the natural beauty of the landscape, in a similar way to the Area of Outstanding Natural Beauty (AONB) designation used elsewhere in the UK. AONBs were created under the National Parks and Access to the Countryside Act 1949, which applies to England, Wales and Northern Ireland. This act allows areas of countryside with significant landscape value in each of the three nations to be designated by their respective governments.

== See also ==
- Area of Outstanding Natural Beauty
- European Landscape Convention
