= NEYC =

NEYC may refer to:

- Liaoning Shenyang Northeast Yucai School, a public school in Shenyang, Liaoning, China
- Northeast and Yilan Coast National Scenic Area, a national scenic area in Taiwan
- North East Youth Council, a youth council in Los Angeles co-founded by Dorit Cypis
