= Tourism Administration =

Government agency of Taiwan

Coordinates: 25.041253°N 121.555869°E

- 觀光署; Guānguāng Shǔ (Mandarin); Kôn-kông Khiu̍k (Hakka)
- Logo

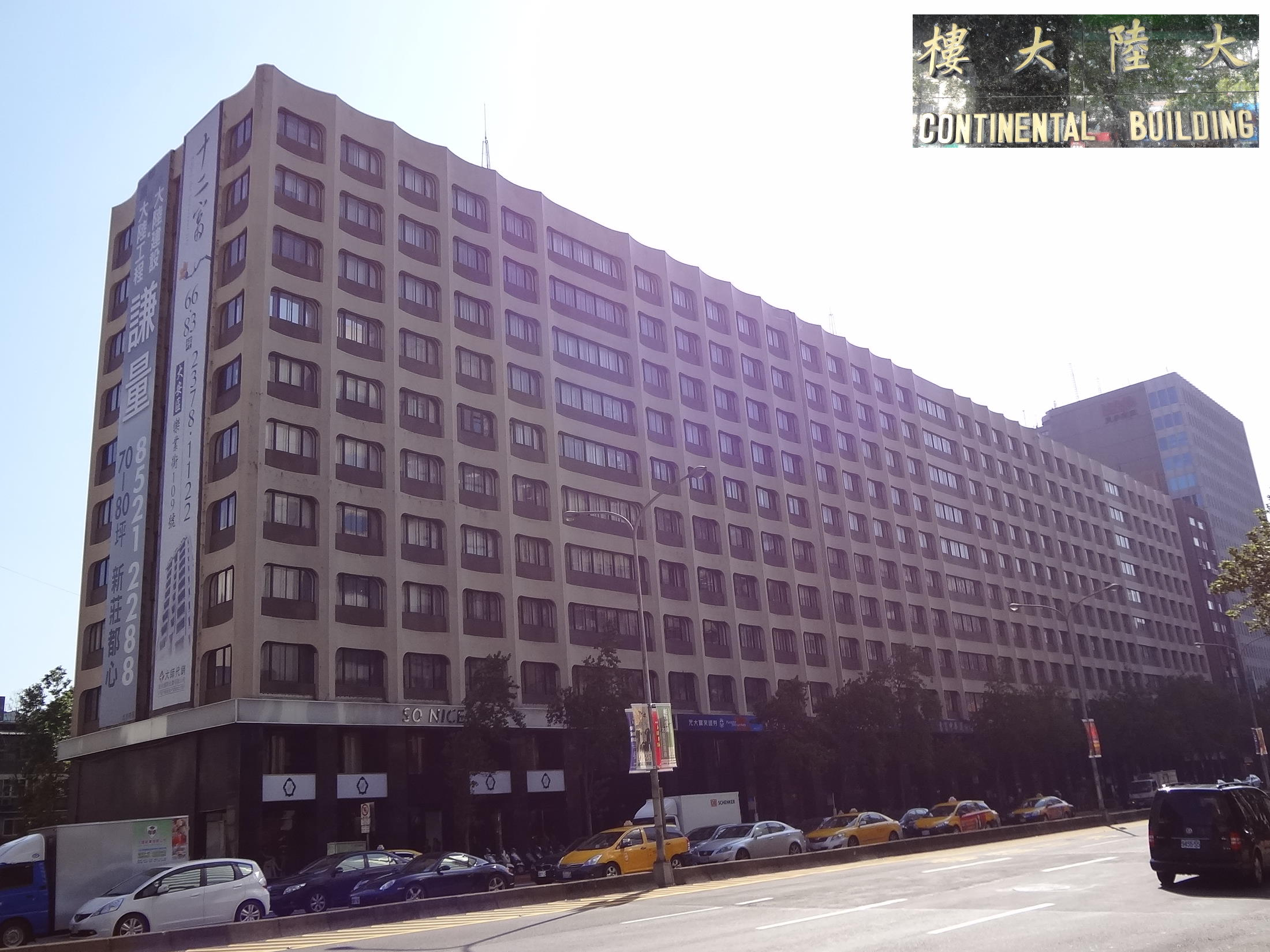
- Tourism Administration in Continental Building

Agency overview
- Formed: September 1960 (as Committee of Tourism); 29 December 1972 (as Tourism Bureau)
- Jurisdiction: Taiwan (Republic of China)
- Headquarters: Daan, Taipei
- Agency executives: David W. J. Hsieh, Director-General; Liu Hsi-lin, Deputy Director-General; Chang Shi-chung, Deputy Director-General
- Parent agency: Ministry of Transportation and Communications
- Website: Official website

The Tourism Administration, MOTC (traditional Chinese: 交通部觀光署; simplified Chinese: 交通部观光署; pinyin: Jiāotōngbù Guānguāng Shǔ; Pe̍h-ōe-jī: Kau-thong-pō͘ Koan-kong-sú) is the government agency under the Ministry of Transportation and Communications of Taiwan (Republic of China) responsible for the administration of domestic and international tourism policy making, execution and development in Taiwan.

== History ==
The development of tourism industry in Taiwan within the government level began in 1956. In September 1960, a Committee of Tourism was set up within the Ministry of Transportation and Communications with the approval from Executive Yuan. The committee was reorganized as the Tourism Council in October 1966, then Tourism Bureau on 29 December 1972, and finally the Tourism Administration in September 2023.

== Organizational structures ==
The organizational structure of Tourism Administration is divided into five sections: administrative units, staff units, tourism service centers, national scenic area headquarters and overseas offices.

=== Administrative units ===
- Planning and Research Division
- International Affairs Division
- Travel and Training Division
- Hotel & Lodging Division
- Tourism Site Development Division
- Technical Division
- Domestic Travel Promotion Division

=== Staff units ===
- Personnel Office
- Accounting Office
- Civil Service Ethics Office
- Information Management Office
- Secretariat
- Public Relations Department

=== Tourism service centers ===
These tourism service centers provide services to foreign tourists visiting Taiwan and to domestic residents traveling abroad.

- Taiwan Taoyuan International Airport Tourist Service Center
- Kaohsiung International Airport Tourist Service Center
- Travel Service Center, main office in Taipei
- Travel Service Center, Taichung office
- Travel Service Center, Tainan office
- Travel Service Center, Kaohsiung office

=== National Scenic Area headquarters ===
- Northeast and Yilan Coast National Scenic Area Headquarters
- East Coast National Scenic Area Headquarters
- East Longitudinal Valley National Scenic Area Headquarters
- Penghu National Scenic Area Headquarters
- Matsu National Scenic Area Headquarters
- North Coast and Guanyinshan National Scenic Area Headquarters
- Tri-Mountain National Scenic Area Headquarters
- Sun Moon Lake National Scenic Area Headquarters
- Alishan National Scenic Area Headquarters
- Southwest Coast National Scenic Area Headquarters
- Siraya National Scenic Area Headquarters
- Maolin National Scenic Area Headquarters
- Dapeng Bay National Scenic Area Headquarters

=== Overseas offices ===
Country	City	Name	Ref.
Japan	Tokyo	Taiwan Visitors Association, Tokyo Office	
Japan	Osaka	Taiwan Visitors Association, Osaka Office	
South Korea	Seoul	Taiwan Visitors Association, Seoul Office	
South Korea	Busan	Taiwan Visitors Association, Busan Office	
Vietnam	Ho Chi Minh City	Tourism Division, Taipei Economic and Cultural Office in Ho Chi Minh City	
Thailand	Bangkok	Tourism Division, Taipei Economic and Cultural Office in Thailand	
India	Mumbai	Taiwan Tourism Information Center in Mumbai	
Singapore	Singapore	Taiwan Visitors Association, Singapore Office	
Malaysia	Kuala Lumpur	Taiwan Visitors Association, Kuala Lumpur Office	
Indonesia	Jakarta	Taiwan Tourism Information Center in Jakarta	
United States	New York City	Tourism Division, Taipei Economic and Cultural Office in New York	
United States	San Francisco	Taiwan Tourism Administration, San Francisco Office	
United States	Los Angeles	Taiwan Tourism Administration, Los Angeles Office/Tourism Division, TECO in LA	
Canada	Vancouver	Taiwan Tourism Information Centre in Vancouver	
Germany	Frankfurt	Taiwan Tourism Administration, Federal Republic of Germany	
France	Paris	Taiwan Tourism Information Center in Paris	
United Kingdom	London	Taiwan Tourism Administration, London Office	
China	Hong Kong	Taiwan Visitors Association, Hong Kong Office	
China	Beijing	Taiwan Strait Tourism Association, Beijing Office	
China	Shanghai	Taiwan Strait Tourism Association Shanghai Branch Office	
China	Fuzhou	Taiwan Strait Tourism Association Shanghai Branch Fuzhou Office	

== Transportation ==
The Tourism Administration is accessible within walking distance West from Sun Yat-sen Memorial Hall Station of the Taipei Metro.

== See also ==
- List of tourist attractions in Taiwan
- Tourism in Taiwan
