= List of national scenic areas in Taiwan =

The National Scenic Areas in Taiwan (Chinese: 國家風景區, Taiwanese: Kok-ka Hong-kéng-khu, Hakka: Koet-kâ Fûng-kín-khî) are managed by the Tourism Administration, Ministry of Transportation and Communications. Currently, there are thirteen national scenic areas.

Name	Chinese	Taiwanese	Hakka	Formosan	Region
Alishan	阿里山	A-lí-san	Â-lî-sân	Psoseongana^{Tsou}	Southern Taiwan
Dapeng Bay	大鵬灣	Tāi-phêng-oan	Thai-phèn-vân		Southern Taiwan
East Coast	東部海岸	Tang-pō͘ Hái-hōaⁿ	Tûng-phu Hói-ngan		Eastern Taiwan
East Longitudinal Valley	花東縱谷	Hoa-Tang Chhióng-kok	Fâ-Tûng Chiúng-kuk		Eastern Taiwan
Maolin	茂林	Bō͘-lîm	Meu-lìm	Teldreka^{Rukai}	Southern Taiwan
Matsu	馬祖	Má-chó͘	Mâ-chú		Outlying Islands
North Coast and Guanyinshan	北海岸及觀音山	Pak-hái-hōaⁿ kap Koan-im-soaⁿ	Pet-hói-ngan khi̍p Kôn-yîm-sân		Northern Taiwan
Northeast and Yilan Coast	東北角暨宜蘭海岸	Tang-pak-kak kap Gî-lân Hái-hōaⁿ	Tûng-pet-kok khi̍p Ngì-làn Hói-ngan		Northern Taiwan
Penghu	澎湖	Phêⁿ-ô͘ / Phîⁿ-ô͘	Phàng-fù		Outlying Islands
Siraya	西拉雅	Se-la-ngá	Sî-lâ-ngâ	Siraya^{Siraya}	Southern Taiwan
Southwest Coast	雲嘉南濱海	Hûn-Ka-Lâm Pin-hái	Yùn-Kâ-Nàm Pîn-hói		Southern Taiwan
Sun Moon Lake	日月潭	Ji̍t-goa̍t-thâm	Ngit-ngie̍t-thàm	Zintun^{Thao}	Central Taiwan
Tri-Mountain	參山	Saⁿ-soaⁿ	Sâm-sân		Central Taiwan

== See also ==
- List of tourist attractions in Taiwan
- National parks of Taiwan
