= Tourism in Taiwan =

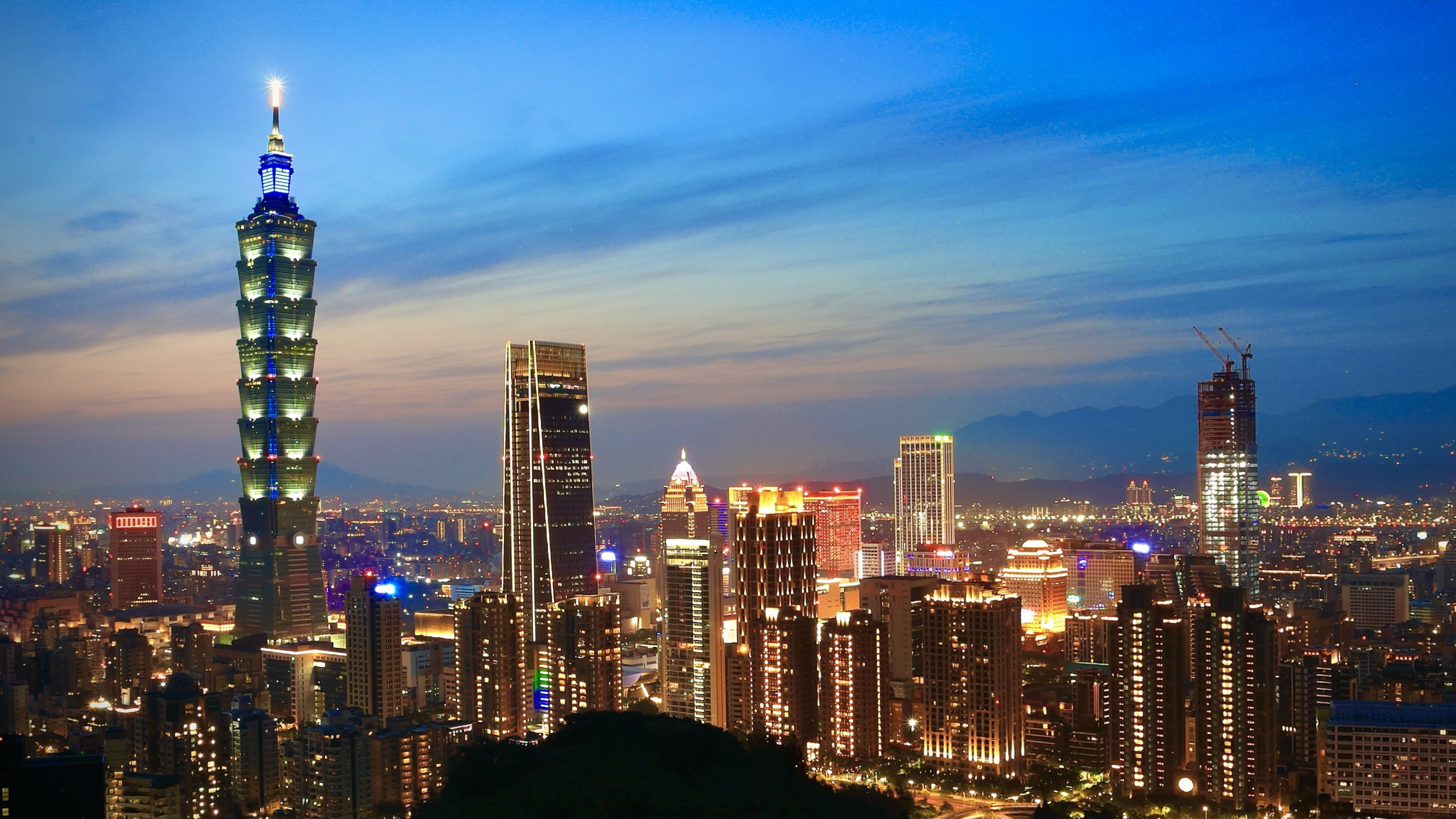
Taipei night skyline with Taipei 101 at left

Tourism in Taiwan is one of the major industries and contributor to the economy of Taiwan. In 2022, Taiwan received under 900,000 international visitors, down from 11.8 million in 2019. Tourism affairs are managed by the Tourism Bureau of the Ministry of Transportation and Communications of Taiwan.

== Tourist destinations ==
There are numerous attractions in Taiwan. Major national icons or tourist attractions include:

City / Area	Attraction	Description
Taipei	National Palace Museum	One of the largest museums in the world holding Chinese artifacts with over 696,000 pieces. The museum was built after the collection was evacuated from mainland China in 1949 to prevent Communist China from controlling and ultimately destroying any artifacts as part of the Cultural Revolution.
Taipei	Presidential Office Building, Taipei	The building housing the Office of the President of the Republic of China (Taiwan). It originally housed the Office of the Governor-General of Taiwan when Taiwan was part of the Empire of Japan from 1895 to 1945.
Taipei	Chiang Kai-shek Memorial Hall	A Memorial Hall built to honor the late President and Generalissimo Chiang Kai-shek.
Taipei	Taipei 101	Formerly the tallest building in the world from 2004 to 2010. Consisting of 101 floors it is primarily a commercial office building with restaurants, clubs, commercial stores and tourist observatories.
Taipei	Shilin Night Market	A night market located in the Shilin District of Taipei, and is often considered to be the largest and most famous night market in the city.
Taipei	Mengjia Longshan Temple	One of the oldest temples in Taipei.
Taipei	Yangmingshan National Park	An expansive national park featuring fumaroles, grasslands, water buffalo, and a large network of hiking trails.
Hualien	Taroko National Park	One of Taiwan's national parks, with the landmark being Taroko Gorge.
Tainan	Fort Zeelandia and Fort Provintia	The oldest city and once an old capital of Taiwan, the city is dotted with ancient temples, shrines and fortress. Tainan is also famous for its traditional Taiwanese cuisine and night markets.
Taichung/ Nantou	Sun Moon Lake	A popular scenic spot. The lake is the largest body of water in Taiwan, situated in Yuchi, Nantou, the area around the Sun Moon Lake is home to the Taiwanese indigenous Thao tribe.
Chiayi	Alishan National Scenic Area	A mountainous natural preserve that includes vibrant wilderness, forests, four villages, waterfalls, high altitude tea plantations, and the famous Alishan Forest Railway, and several hiking trails. It is also a famous flower spotting, particularly cherry blossom, destination during spring time.
Chiayi	Hinoki Village	A village that was originally the dormitories of the Chiayi Forest division of Forestry Bureau of the Taiwan Governor General Office during the Japanese rule of Taiwan.
Tainan	Chihkan Tower	A tower that was built 1653 during the Dutch colonization of Taiwan.

== Tourism statistics ==
Yearly tourist arrivals in millions

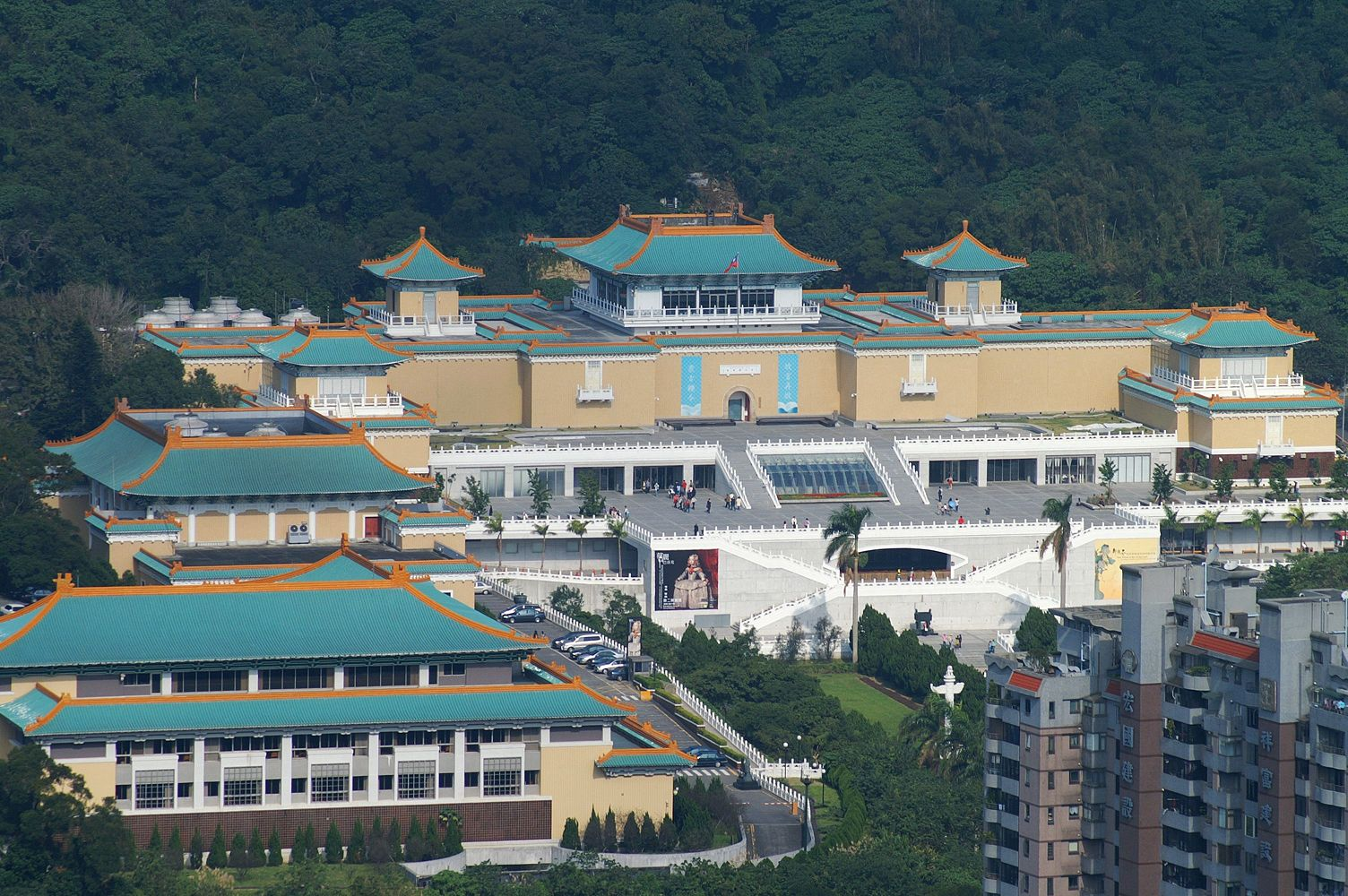
National Palace Museum, Taipei

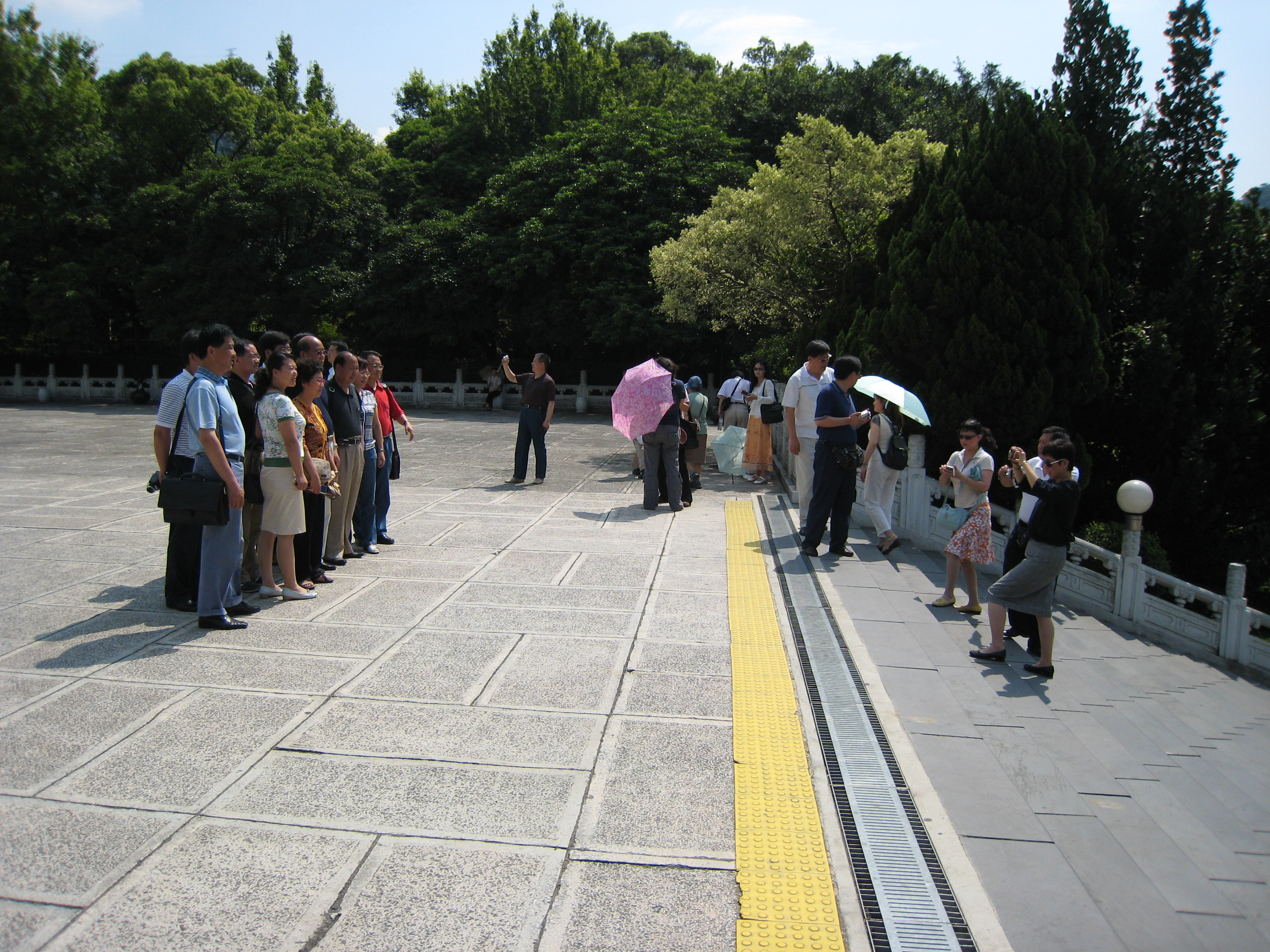
Chinese tourists at the National Palace Museum

=== International visitors ===
Share of visitors to Taiwan by residence in 2017

The top 12 nationalities of international visitors for tourism purpose (pleasure) are:

Rank	Country / Territory	2016
1	China	2,845,547
2	Hong Kong	1,397,233
3	Japan	1,379,233
4	South Korea	693,224
5	Malaysia	339,710
6	Singapore	292,240
7	United States	166,044
8	Thailand	110,116
9	Canada	54,987
10	Philippines	48,198
11	Vietnam	36,839
12	Indonesia	32,868
Source: Tourism Bureau, Taiwan

The top international visitors in Taiwan for all purposes are:

Country / Territory	9/2026	2025	2024	2023	2022	2021	2020	2019	2018
Japan	1,013,137	1,483,176	1,319,592	928,235	87,616	10,056	269,659	2,167,952	1,969,151
Hong Kong	824,577	1,203,733	1,198,217	1,199,572	32,621	10,760	177,654	1,758,006	1,653,654
South Korea	683,794	1,016,520	1,003,086	744,727	51,748	3,300	178,911	1,242,598	1,019,441
United States	547,453	715,481	651,264	529,532	90,614	11,981	82,872	605,054	580,072
Philippines	543,492	627,286	467,157	350,487	64,038	9,183	77,065	509,519	419,105
China	486,912	637,060	438,212	226,269	24,378	13,267	111,050	2,714,065	2,695,615
Vietnam	363,738	426,114	370,548	382,529	134,818	24,935	110,882	405,396	490,774
Thailand	290,246	411,646	400,038	394,688	74,434	7,570	63,553	413,926	320,008
Singapore	274,025	446,281	447,841	463,893	69,507	2,417	49,946	460,635	427,222
Malaysia	244,554	385,787	429,727	437,491	59,035	6,205	72,705	537,692	526,129
Indonesia	197,998	235,148	224,477	201,980	78,162	13,819	55,717	229,960	210,985
Australia	85,924	125,288	112,547	87,288	11,509	568	18,906	111,788	102,541
Canada	84,009	118,252	112,137	92,404	13,244	1,178	18,857	136,651	128,456
Macau	80,757	106,406	112,760	95,053	1,612	1,166	15,336	159,783	147,118
Germany	61,908	83,394	73,680	60,704	10,811	1,937	9,361	72,708	65,330
United Kingdom	53,501	77,958	67,882	60,779	13,723	2,964	11,879	76,904	71,030
France	39,937	53,818	49,853	42,852	8,349	1,567	8,975	57,393	52,687
India	36,599	46,134	38,158	31,584	9,390	1,930	6,606	40,353	38,385
Netherlands	20,464	28,075	24,602	21,571	6,190	2,070	5,311	27,640	25,835
Italy	16,392	21,914	16,752	14,330	3,011	539	2,267	20,115	19,577
New Zealand	12,319	18,242	17,053	15,040	2,792	159	3,093	19,831	16,362
Switzerland	11,846	15,137	12,471	9,870	1,602	216	1,491	12,011	11,239
Spain	11,743	15,929	12,914	9,836	1,962	423	2,022	14,298	13,006
Israel	9,773	10,807	7,044	5,626	1,390	231	1,271	11,030	9,812
Austria	8,218	11,039	9,860	8,612	1,470	248	1,622	9,160	9,261
Belgium	7,029	9,754	7,976	6,762	1,879	681	1,602	8,980	7,845
Russia	6,989	8,281	6,821	5,592	1,786	724	2,939	17,621	10,394
Czech Republic	6,519	8,049	7,048	5,714	798	156	991	4,718	4,614
Sweden	5,662	7,743	7,174	6,245	1,429	279	1,499	9,522	9,206
Denmark	5,299	8,061	6,848	6,241	2,197	863	1,609	7,667	6,477
Mexico	4,420	5,375	4,403	3,436	713	181	600	4,033	4,334
Brazil	3,872	5,414	4,258	3,243	723	171	823	5,417	5,042
Turkey	3,810	5,656	4,330	3,707	895	156	627	4,892	4,550
South Africa	3,699	5,169	4,815	4,408	1,625	355	1,258	5,872	5,596
Ireland	3,228	4,375	3,664	3,546	987	258	805	4,218	3,748
Greece	1,491	1,950	1,691	1,428	260	71	280	2,050	1,755
Chile	1,356	1,581	1,398	1,153	185	38	260	1,697	1,652
Argentina	1,007	1,332	1,089	842	195	52	272	1,284	1,459
Grand Total	6,176,613	8,574,547	7,857,686	6,486,951	895,962	140,479	1,377,861	11,864,105	11,066,707
Source: Tourism Bureau, Taiwan

In 2022, as a result of the COVID-19 pandemic, Taiwan received fewer than 900,000 international visitors. To encourage more tourists, selected participants from Canada, the United States, Japan, Slovakia, France, the Netherlands, South Korea, Vietnam, Thailand, Malaysia, India, and Israel were invited in 2023 to promote Taiwan on their social media pages. The Taiwan Tourism Bureau also planned to offer monetary "tourist cards" to visitors from certain countries, offering discounts on travel and accommodation.

== Types of tourism ==
Tourism in Taiwan includes business, pleasure, visiting relatives, conferences, study, exhibitions, medical treatment and others.

There has been a surge in tourism numbers noticeably around election time in Taiwan, especially tourists from China. However, tourists from China have declined significantly since President Tsai Ing-Wen took office in 2016. Tsai is a member of the Democratic Progressive Party, which the Chinese Communist Party opposes. Therefore, the Chinese government has reduced the number of travel visas issued to its citizens to visit Taiwan.

Agritourism forms a significant part of the total revenue for the agricultural industry. Many small family farms rely on tourism as their primary means of earning an income. Leisure farms, farm tours, farm stays, and other tourism related activities are popular both with domestic Taiwanese travelers and with international ones. The Taiwanese Agritourism industry has received significant state support. In 2018 TreeHugger ranked Taiwan the #1 agritourism destination in the world. In 2021 as a result of the tourism downturn due to the COVID-19 pandemic the Council of Agriculture announced subsidies for leisure farms.

Fruit tourism is a subsection of agritourism with fruit picking being the prime attraction. Taiwan's diverse subtropical climate means that there is always some sort of fruit in season. Fruit tourism is popular with both domestic and international tourists. The region of Pingtung in particular is a fruit tourism destination.

Culinary tourism forms a significant segment of Taiwan's tourist industry. By 2024, a significant percentage of specialty coffeehouses in Taiwan were roasting their own beans, and tourists had started visiting Taiwan specifically to go "cafe hopping."

Taiwan has used culinary diplomacy to bolster its tourism sector and to conduct diplomacy in countries with which it has limited official ties.

== Domestic tourism ==
In 2015, 87% of Taiwanese had domestic travel for their tourism activities, in which the Kenting National Park became their most favorite destination. They spent an average of NT$9,323 per capita for each vacation, which was mainly for accommodation expenditure.

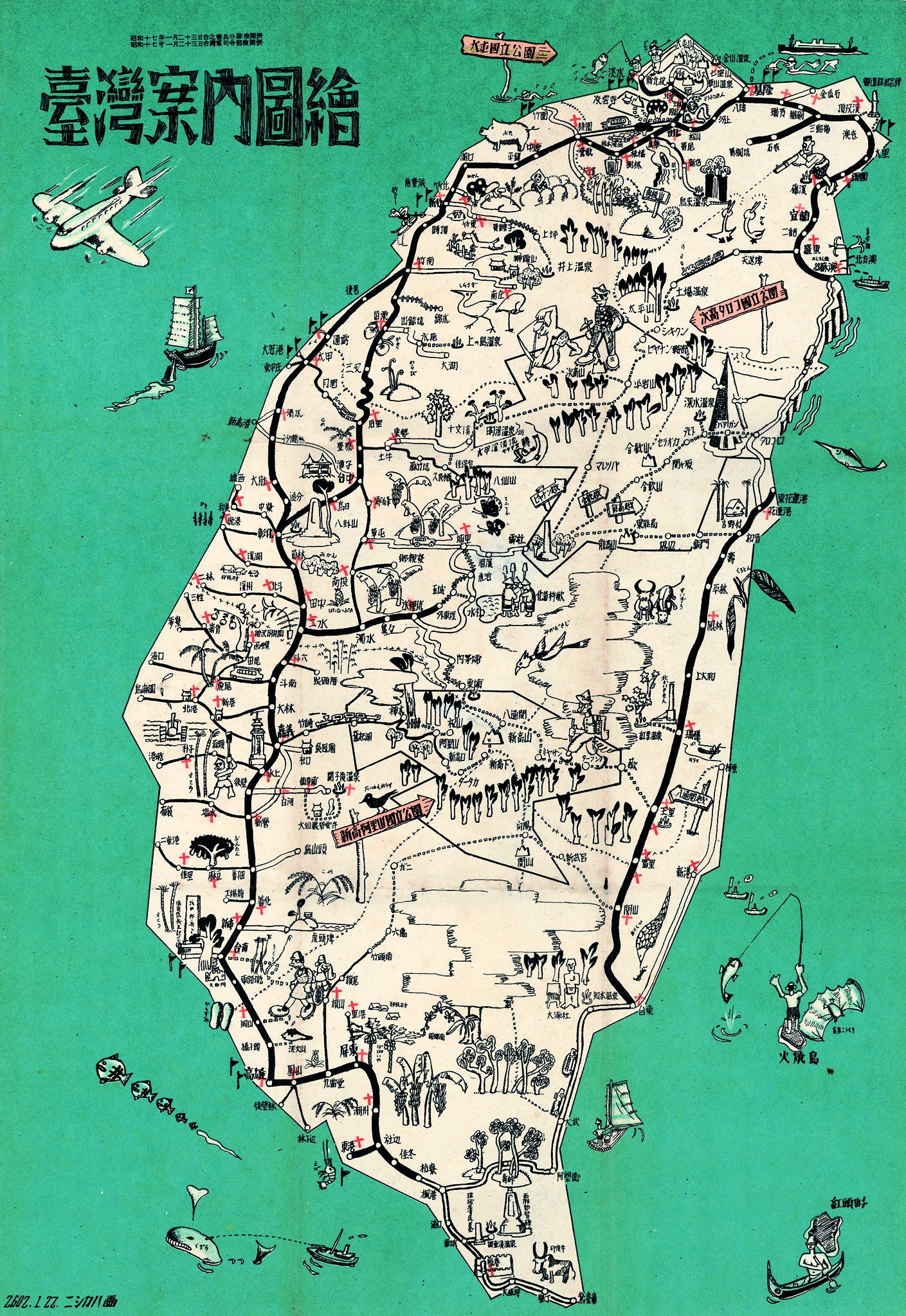
A 1942 tourist travel map of Taiwan, with outlines of railroads in black.

== Tourism revenue ==
The 2013 annual income for Taiwan from tourism-related industries topped at NT$366.8 billion (US$12.3 billion), an increase of 4.7% from the previous year. The average daily spending of each tourist in 2013 was US$224.07, a decrease of 4.37% from the previous year.

In 2015, total revenue from tourism amounted US$14.39 billion, with an average daily spending by each visitor of US$208.

== Stay duration ==
In 2015, the average length of stay for each tourist visiting Taiwan was 6.63 nights.

== UNESCO status ==
Taiwan has yet to nominate possible inscriptions in any UNESCO networks, such as UNESCO Intangible Cultural Heritage Lists, World Heritage List, World Network of Biosphere Reserves, Creative Cities Network, and Global Geoparks Network, due to China's rejection of the country's entrance to UNESCO. However, in order make use of the conservation concepts achieved by the UNESCO networks, the Bureau of Cultural Heritage under the Ministry of Culture began in 2002 to compile a list of potential world heritage sites in Taiwan with currently 18 entries.

== Infrastructure ==
=== International airports ===
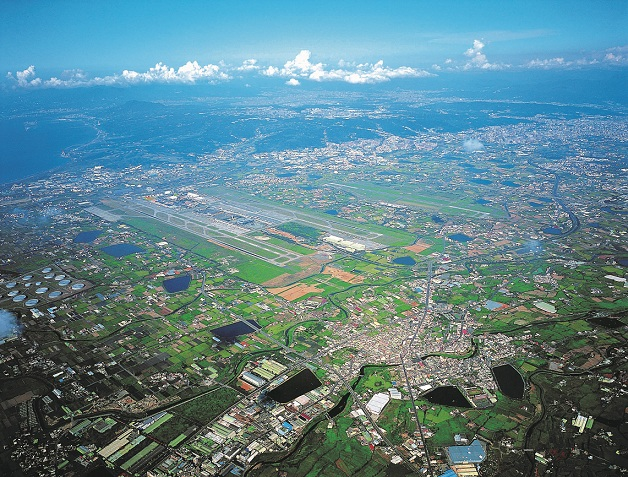
Taoyuan International Airport

Tourists mainly arrive by air and Taoyuan International Airport serves as the most popular airport bringing international tourists into Taiwan as it is the largest airport in Taiwan and important regional hub. Other major airports in Taiwan which facilitate international visitors include Kaohsiung International Airport servicing southern Taiwan, Taichung Airport servicing central Taiwan and Taipei Songshan Airport servicing central Taipei.

=== Public transport ===
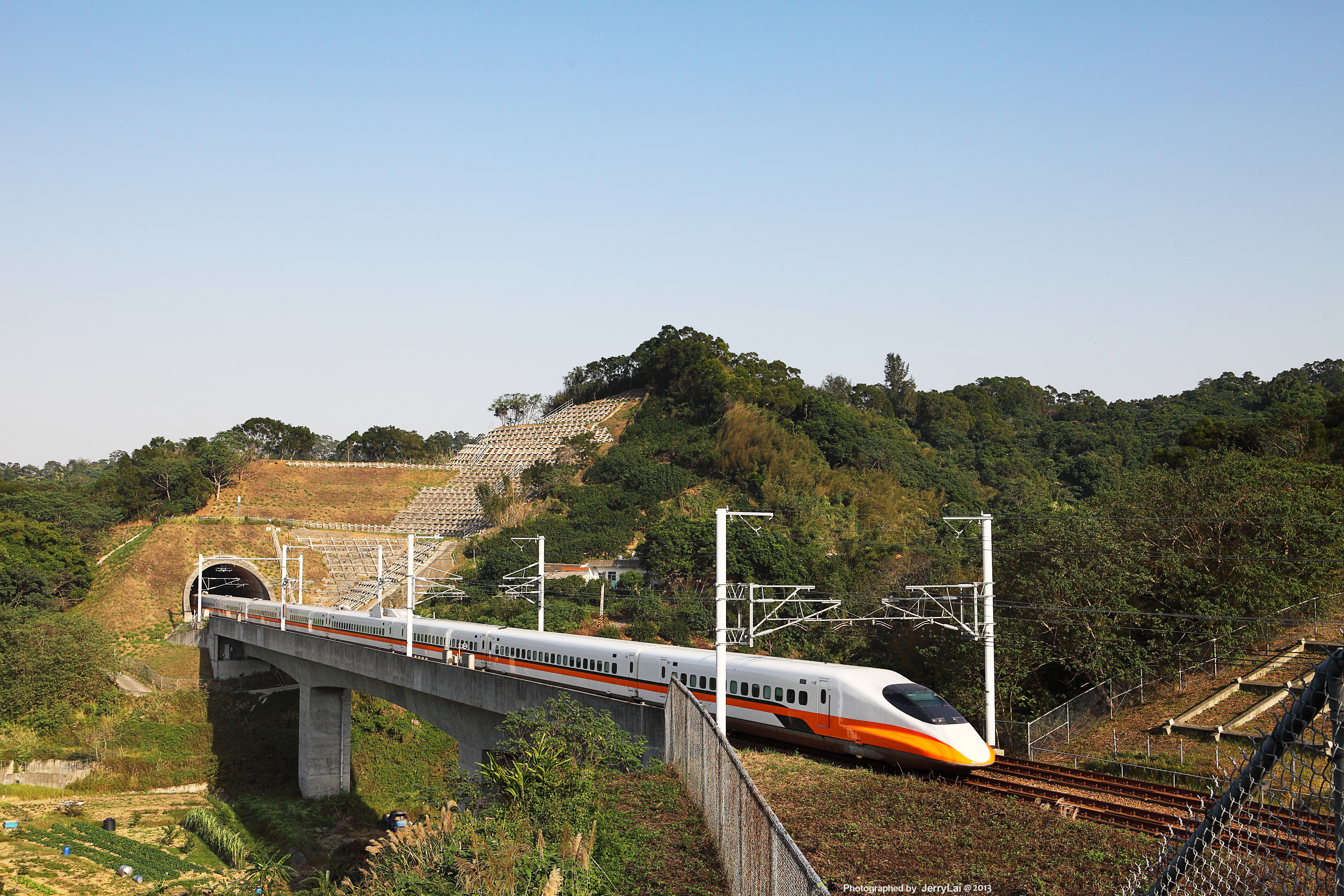
Taiwan High Speed Rail 700T

Tourists are able to travel around the island by using a wide variety of transportation modes. The most popular ways are Taiwan High Speed Rail, conventional trains on Taiwan Railway, and the metropolitan cities' metro systems such as the Taipei Metro, Taoyuan Metro, and Kaohsiung MRT as a result of multiple transport hubs which allow travellers to easily transfer between the different systems. A tourist bus called "Taiwan Tourist Shuttle" and taxis are also popular.

== Gallery ==
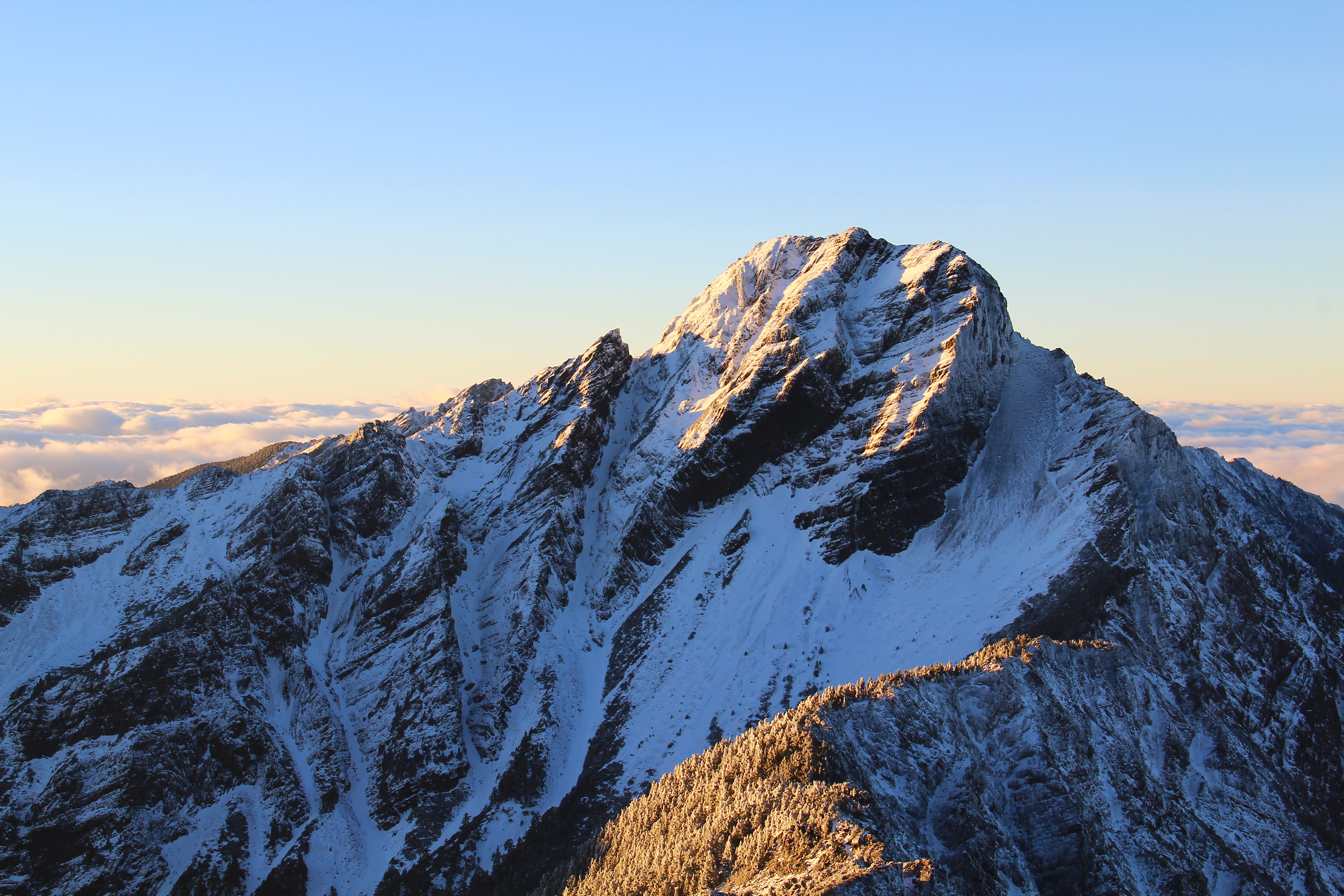
Yu Shan, Chiayi

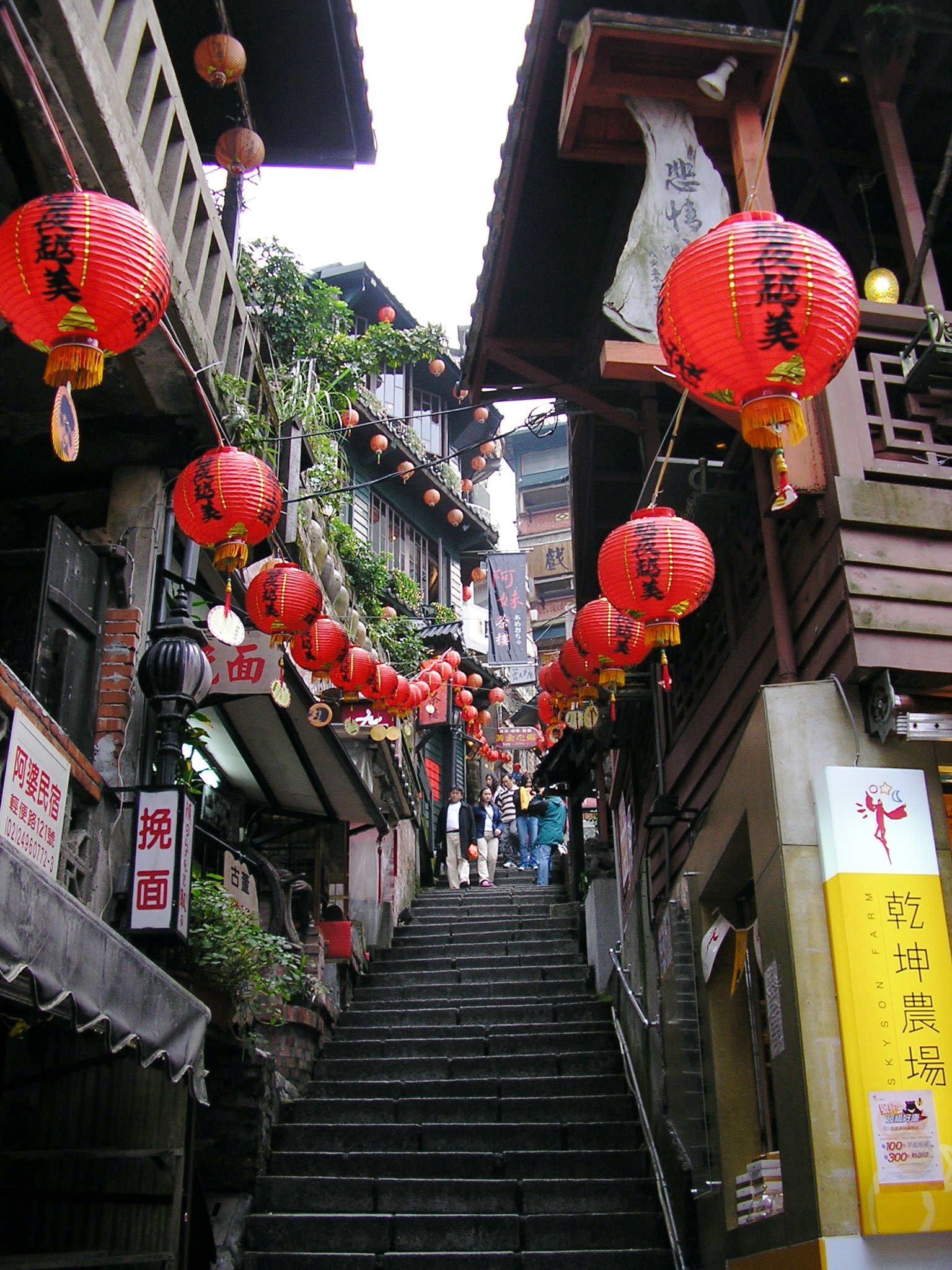
Jiufen Old Street, New Taipei City

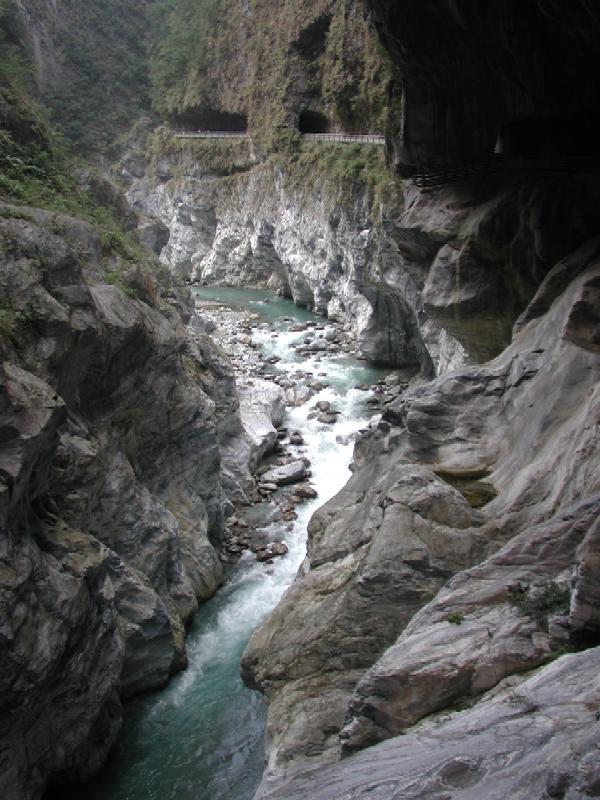
Taroko National Park, Hualien

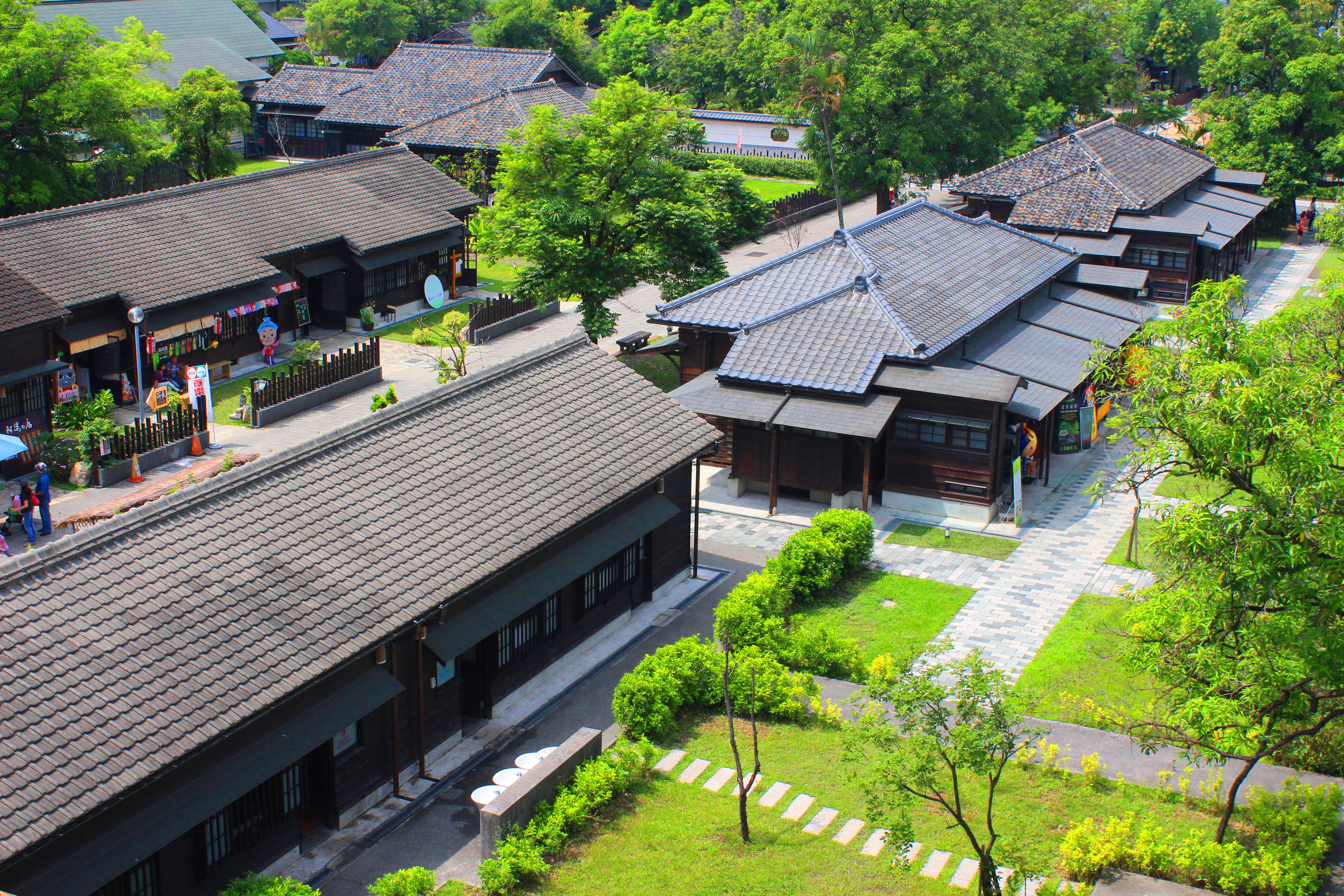
Hinoki Village, Chiayi

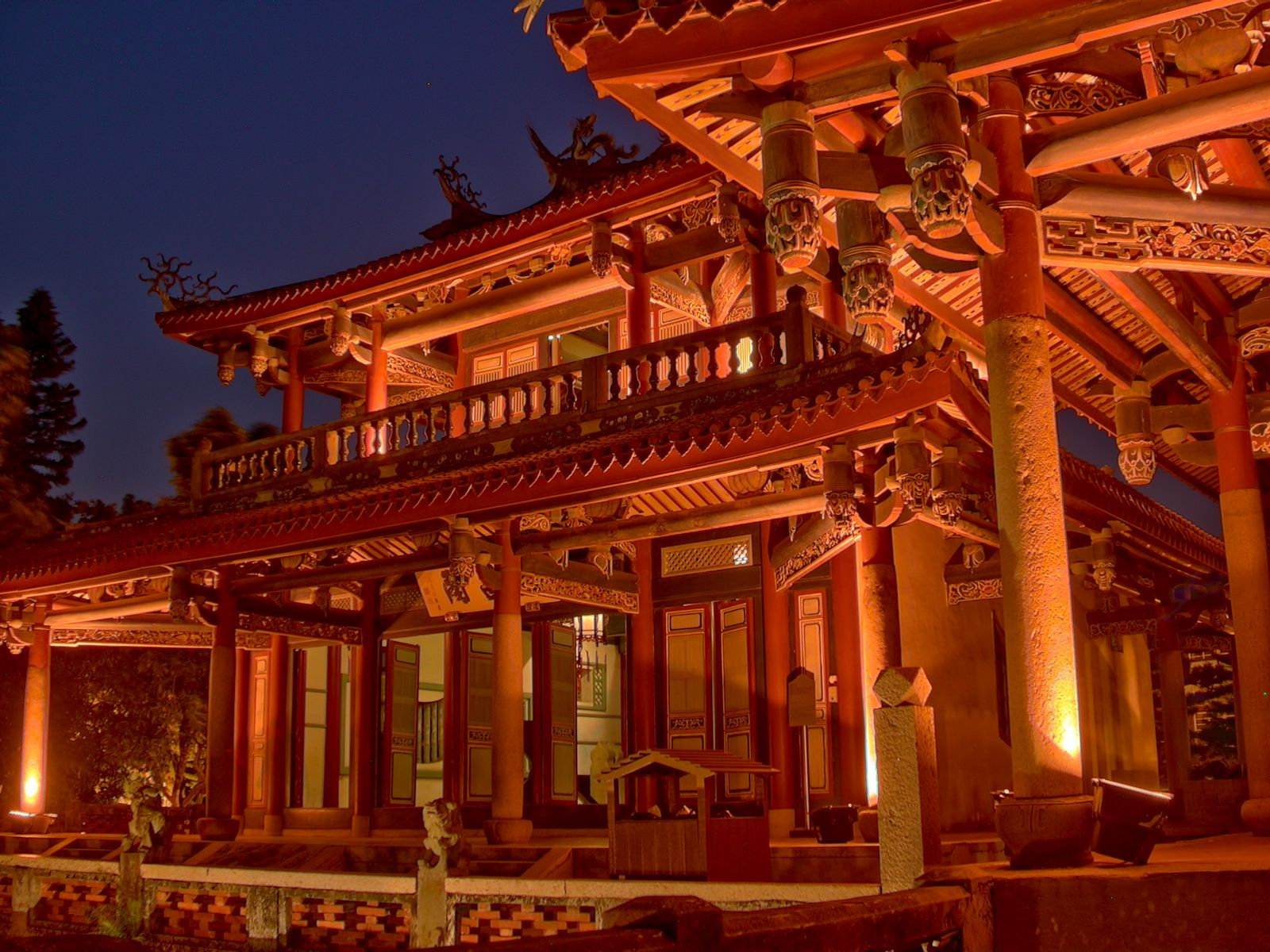
Chihkan Tower, Tainan

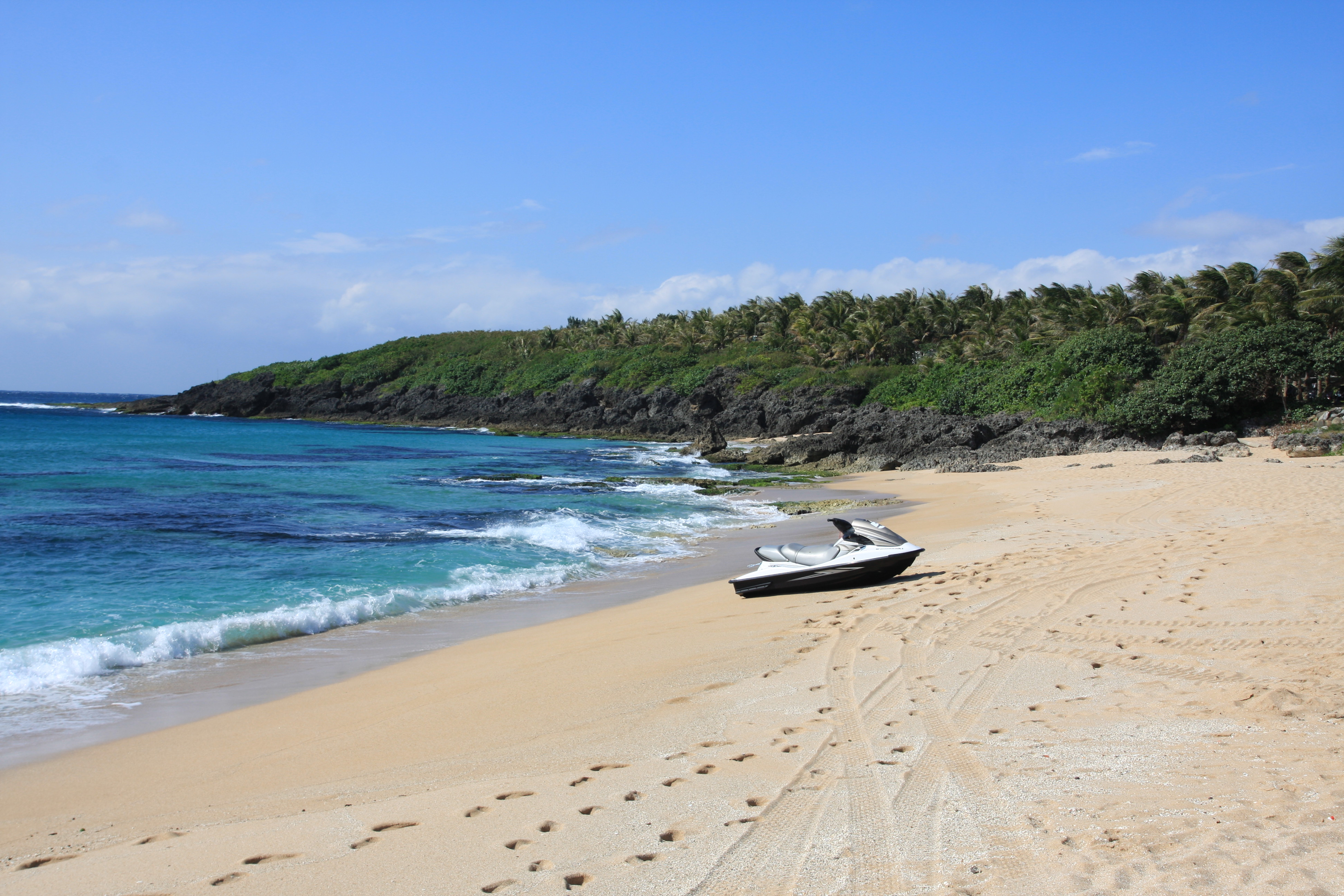
A beach near Kenting

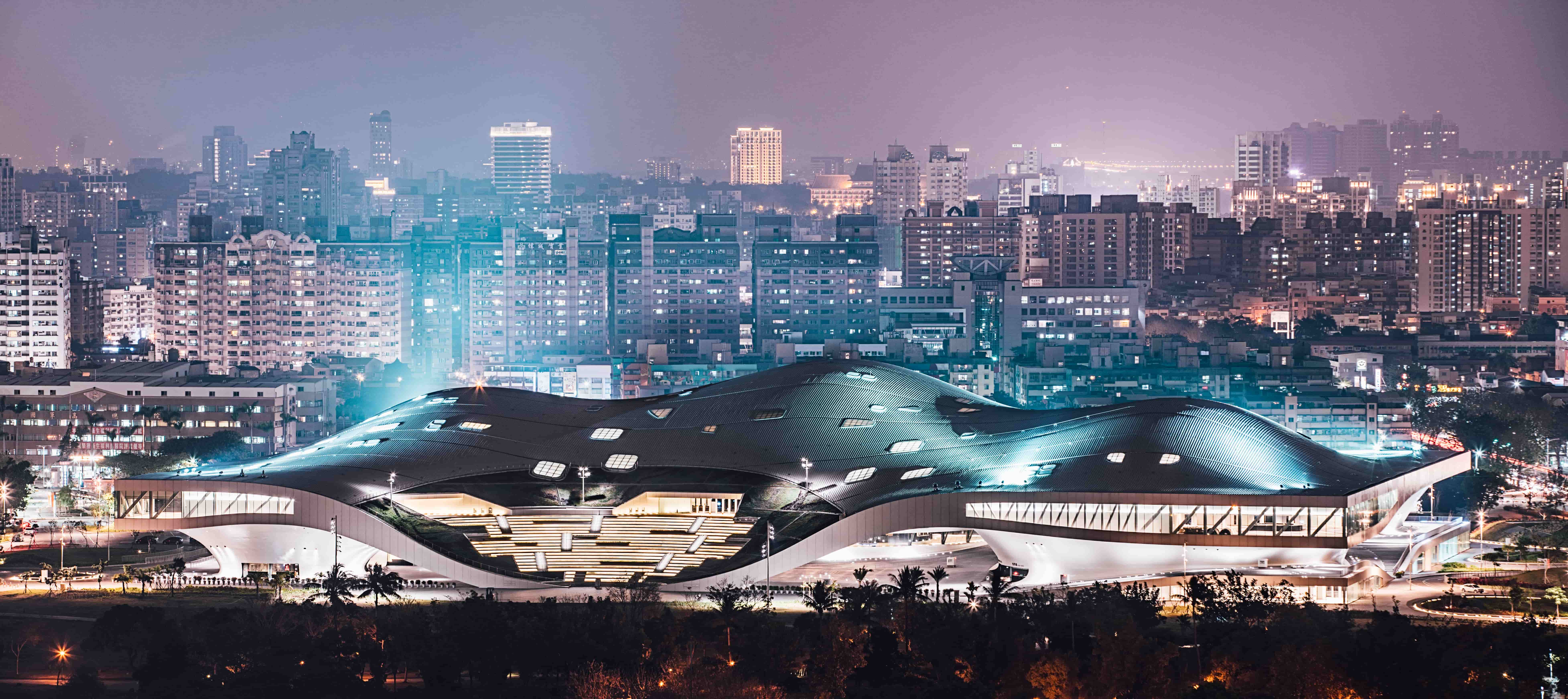
National Kaohsiung Center for the Arts

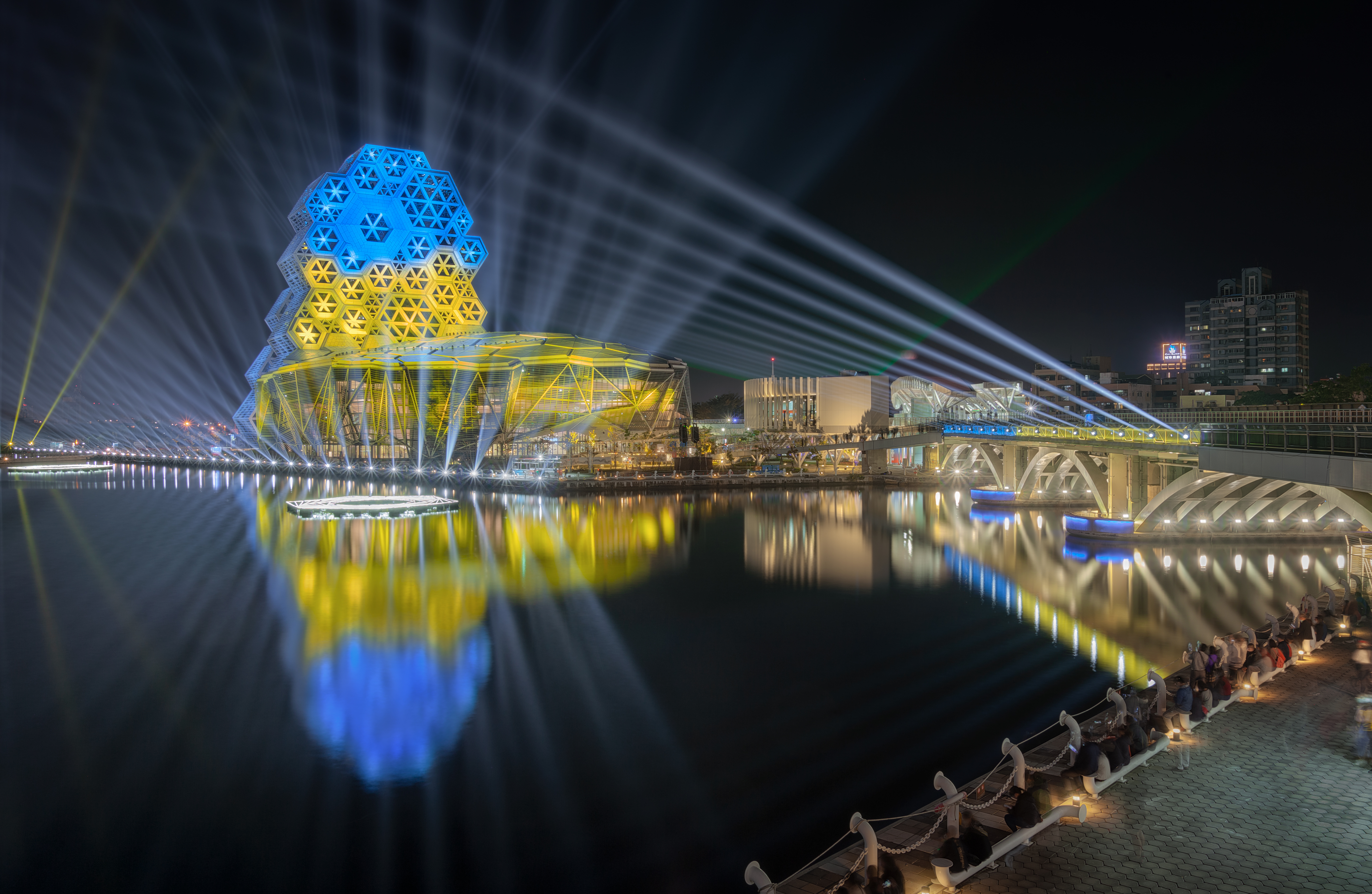
Kaohsiung Music Center lit with Ukrainian flag colors during 2022 Taiwan Lantern Festival

== See also ==
- Visa policy of Taiwan
- Tourism in China
- Tourism in Japan
- List of tourist attractions in Taiwan
- List of museums in Taiwan
- List of restaurants in Taiwan
- List of Michelin-starred restaurants in Taiwan
- Kaohsiung Music Center
- National Kaohsiung Center for the Arts
- National Kaohsiung University of Hospitality and Tourism
