= Shoutian Temple =

Temple in Nantou County, Taiwan

- 受天宮
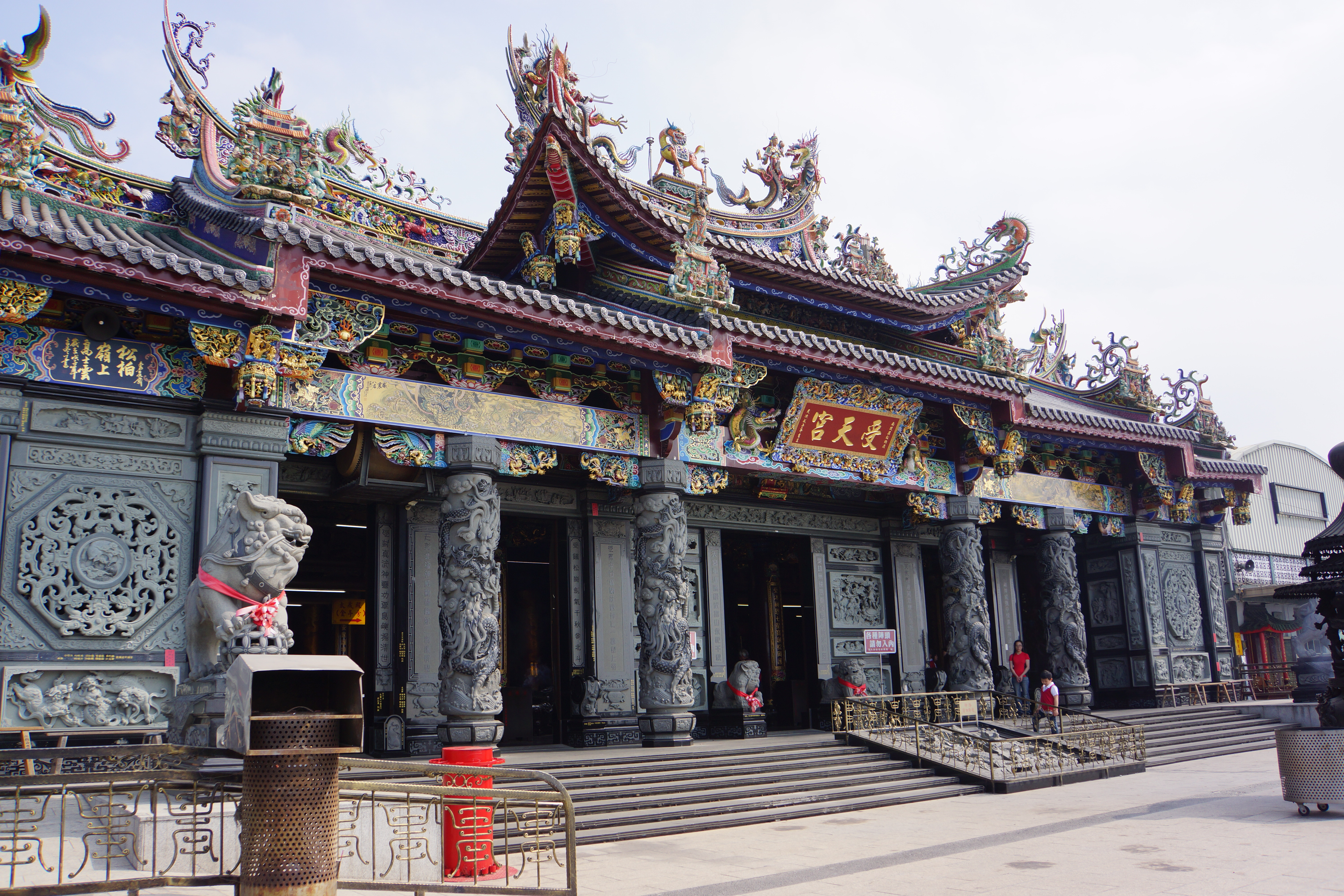

- Location within Nantou County

Religion
- Affiliation: Taoism
- Deity: Xuantian Shangdi

Location
- Location: Mingjian, Nantou County, Taiwan
- Interactive map of Shoutian Temple
- Coordinates: 23.8317°N 120.6307°E

Architecture
- Completed: 1657
- Direction of façade: Southwest

Songboling Shoutian Temple (Chinese: 松柏嶺受天宮; pinyin: Sōngbólǐng Shòutiān Gōng), alternatively known as Mingjian Shoutian Temple, is a temple located in Songboling, Mingjian Township, Nantou County, Taiwan. The temple sits on top of the Bagua Plateau within Tri-Mountain National Scenic Area near the border of Ershui Township, Changhua County. It is dedicated to the prominent Taoist Deity Xuantian Shangdi, and has more than 5,000 affiliated temples around the island.

== History ==
The temple was first established in 1657 by Chinese settlers from Fujian. According to local beliefs, in 1737, Xuantian Shangdi revealed himself on his birthday, which is the third day of the third month in the lunar calendar. The deity indicated that Songboling has very good feng shui and instructed residents to build a larger temple. Additionally, Xuantian Shangdi traveled to Lukang and ordered a sculptor to craft three statues of him, which are currently stored in the temple.

The temple was renovated in June 1973. However, the temple was heavily damaged in the 1999 Jiji earthquake. Furthermore, on 17 June 2000, a large fire caused further destruction to the building. The temple's reconstruction was completed in 2008.

== Traditions ==
The largest celebration at Shoutian Temple occurs on Xuantian Shangdi's birthday, which is the third day of the third month in the lunar calendar. On this day, many temples around the island would embark on pilgrimages to Shoutian Temple and pay tribute. According to the temple, in 2017, more than one million worshippers visited the temple during this celebration.

Around Lantern Festival, Shoutian Temple has a tradition where worshippers carry pieces of a large rice cake (米糕) on carrying poles and parade around the temple, a tradition that began roughly twenty years ago. In 2019, the total weight of the rice cakes was 8,888 kg (19,595 lb) since eight is considered a lucky number in Chinese culture.

Shoutian Temple is regarded as an efficacious center of spiritual strength and several branch temples have been created by splitting the incense at Shoutian Temple.
