= Dapeng Bay =

Lagoon in Pingtung County, Taiwan

- 大鵬灣 (Chinese)
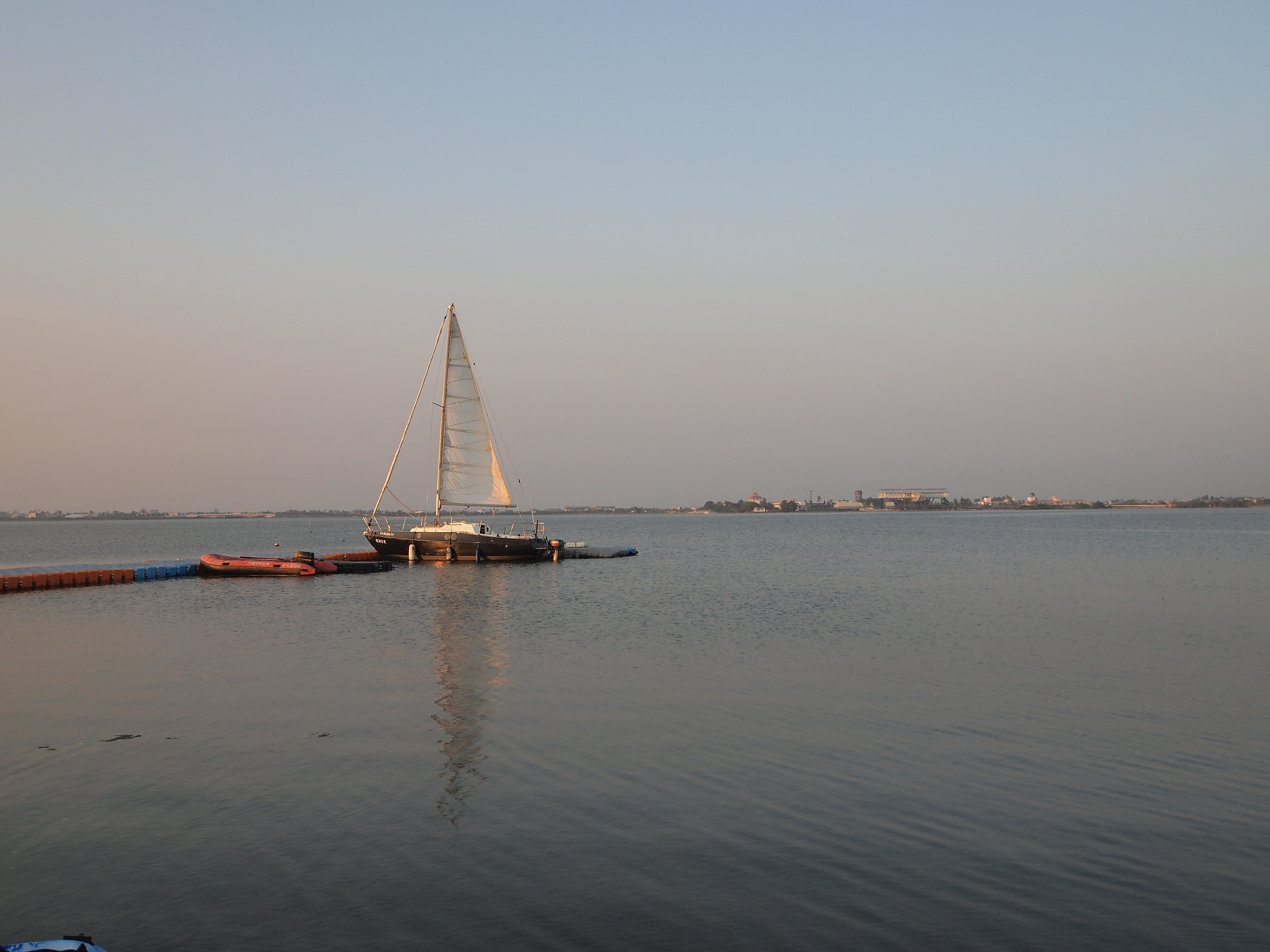
- Dapeng Bay is located at the south of Donggang Township

- Location within Pingtung County
- Location: Donggang, Pingtung County, Taiwan
- Coordinates: 22°26′46″N 120°28′30″E
- Type: Lagoon
- River sources: Linbian River(林邊溪)
- Managing agency: Dapeng Bay National Scenic Area Administration,Tourism Bureau, Ministry of Transportation and Communications
- Designation: national scenic areas
- Average depth: 3 m (9.8 ft)

Dapeng Bay
- Traditional Chinese: 大鵬灣
- Simplified Chinese: 大鹏湾
- Literal meaning: Peng or Roc Bay
Transcriptions
Standard Mandarin
- Hanyu Pinyin: Dàpéng Wān
- Wade–Giles: Ta-p‘êng Wan

Dapeng Bay or Dapeng Wan is a lagoon in Donggang Township, Pingtung County, Taiwan. It is the largest lagoon on the southwest coastline of Taiwan Island.

== Scenic Area ==
The Dapeng Bay National Scenic Area is a nationally protected area that includes the bay as well as nearby Liuqiu Island.

== Transportation ==
The bay is accessible within walking distance west of Zhen'an Station of Taiwan Railway.
