= Tri-Mountain National Scenic Area =

National scenic area in central Taiwan

- 參山國家風景區
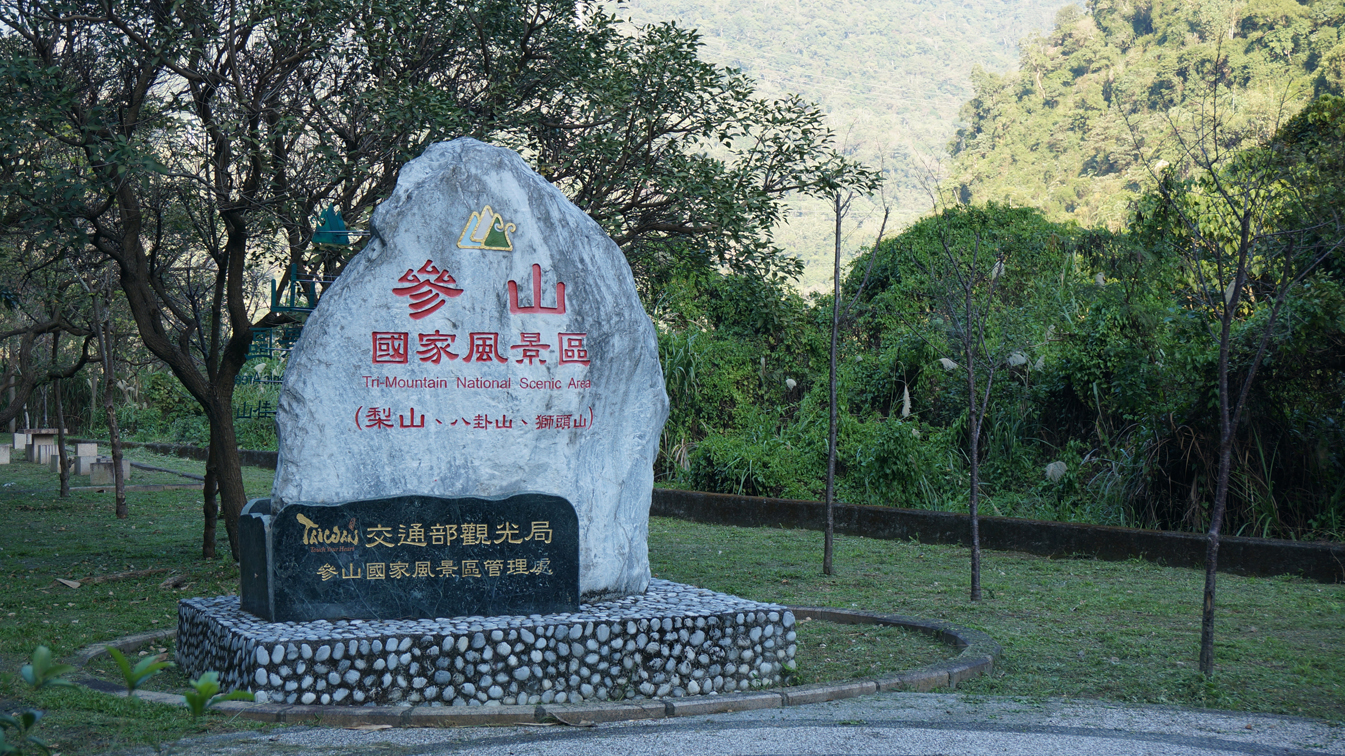
- Interactive map of Tri-Mountain National Scenic Area
- Location: Central Taiwan
- Coordinates: 24.058342°N 120.698406°E
- Area: 77,521 ha (299.31 sq mi)
- Designation: National scenic area
- Created: 16 March 2001
- Administrator: Tourism Bureau

Tri-Mountain National Scenic Area (Chinese: 參山國家風景區; pinyin: Sānshān Guójiā Fēngjǐngqū) is a national scenic area located within central Taiwan, spanning Hsinchu County, Miaoli County, Taichung City, Changhua County, and Nantou County. The area is composed of three non-contiguous scenic areas (Baguashan, Shitoushan, and Lishan), which are all named after mountains, hence the name.

The three scenic areas were formerly distinct and designated as province-level scenic areas. With the deprecation of the Taiwan Provincial Government, the areas were merged into one for easier management on 16 March 2001. The management office is located outside of the scenic area in Wufeng District, Taichung.

== Baguashan ==
Baguashan (Chinese: 八卦山; pinyin: Bāguàshān) is located within Changhua County and Nantou County and encompasses the entire Bagua Plateau. The scenic area is most known for its 26 m tall Buddha statue and a nearby skywalk. The plateau is also known for producing pineapple, turmeric, dragon fruit, and tea. The area also contains Shoutian Temple, a popular temple dedicated to Xuantian Shangdi.

== Shitoushan ==
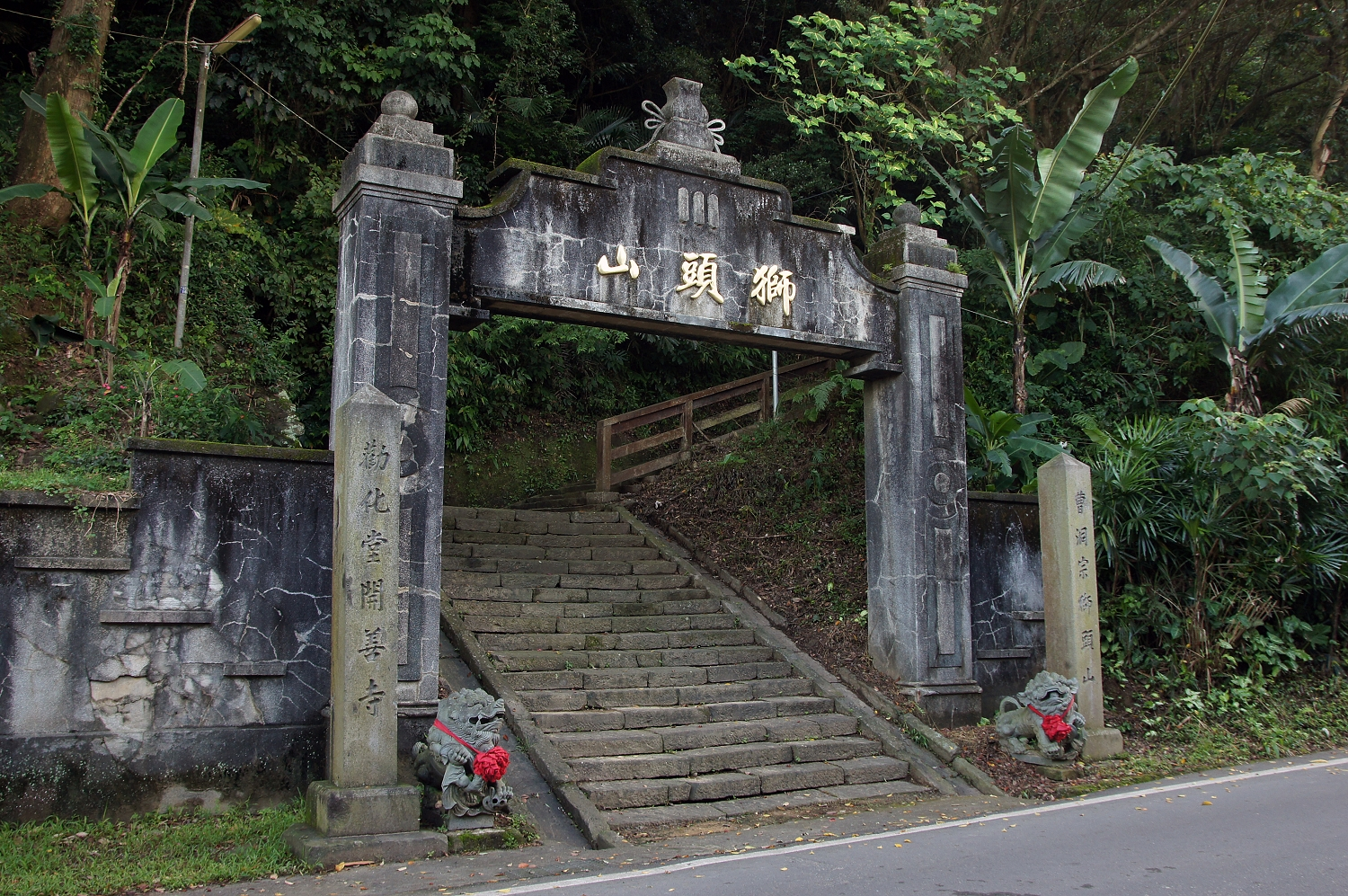
Shishan Path trailhead.

Shitoushan (Chinese: 獅頭山; pinyin: Shītóushān; lit. 'lion head mountain') is located in Hsinchu County and Miaoli County. The scenic area's namesake is known for its many Buddhist and Daoist temples that are built into cliffs. A 5 km historic hiking trail known as the Shishan Path (獅山古道) connects the eleven temples. Also within the area is Nanzhuang Old Street, a Hakka settlement in Miaoli and tourist attraction. The scenic area is also home to the Atayal people and Saisiyat people.

== Lishan ==
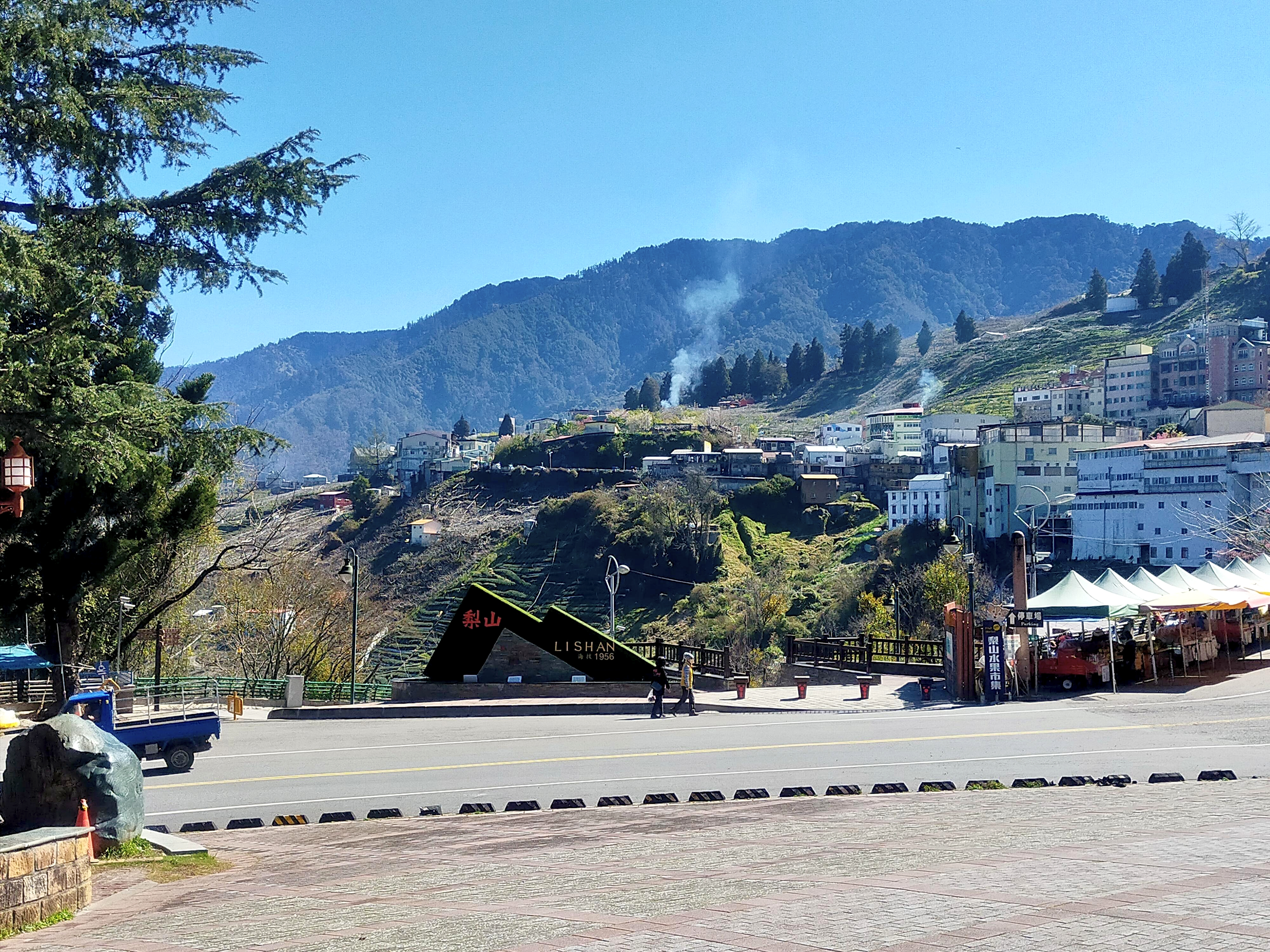
In front of Lishan Hotel

Lishan (Chinese: 梨山; pinyin: Líshān) is located entirely within Heping District, Taichung. The area is historically inhabited by the Atayal people and is known for its high-altitude agricultural products, notably peaches, Asian pears, apples, and various vegetables. Guguan, a hot spring town, is also located within the scenic area.

== See also ==
- National parks of Taiwan
