= Siraya National Scenic Area =

2005 designated scenic area in Taiwan

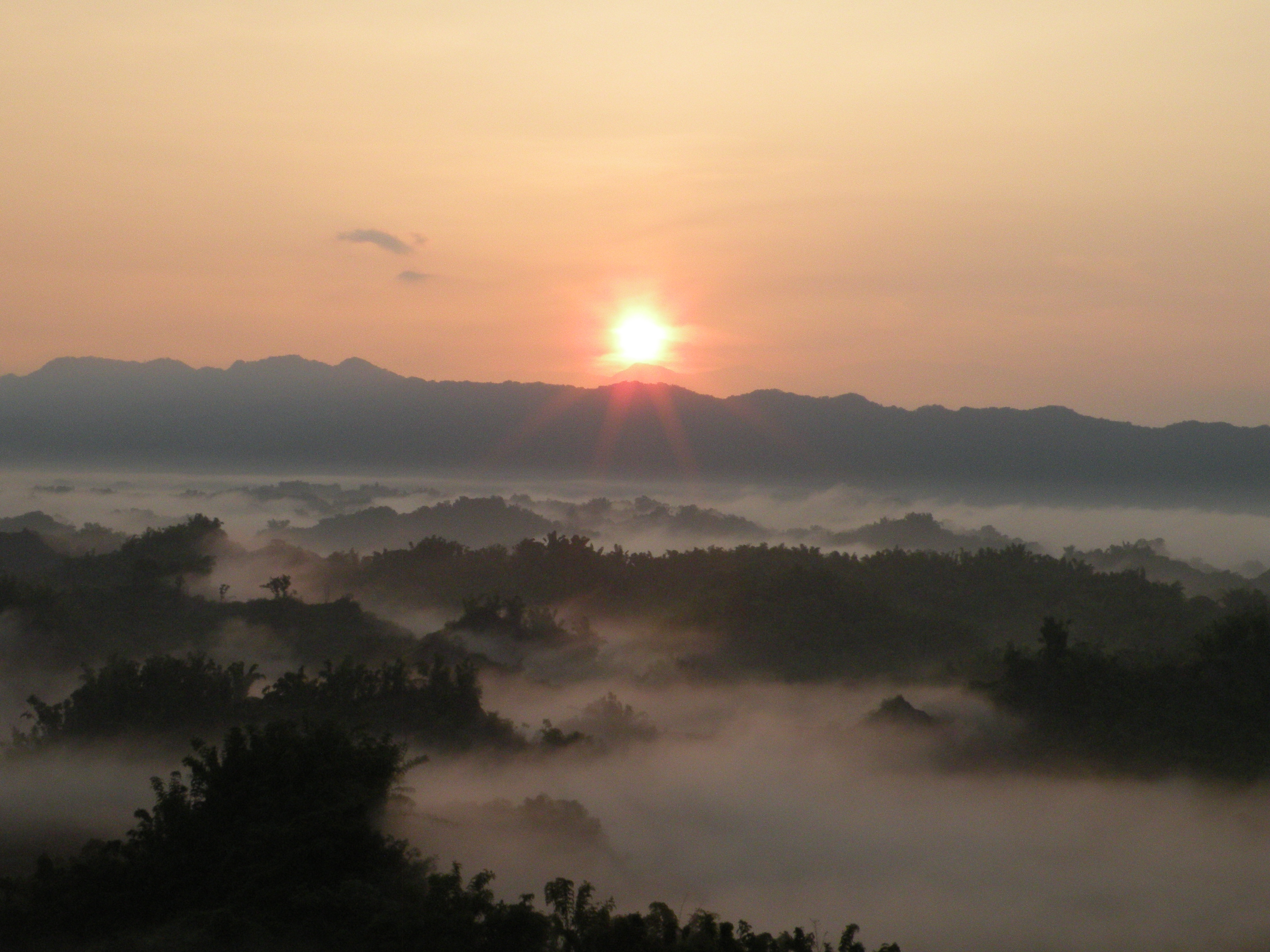
Siraya National Scenic Area

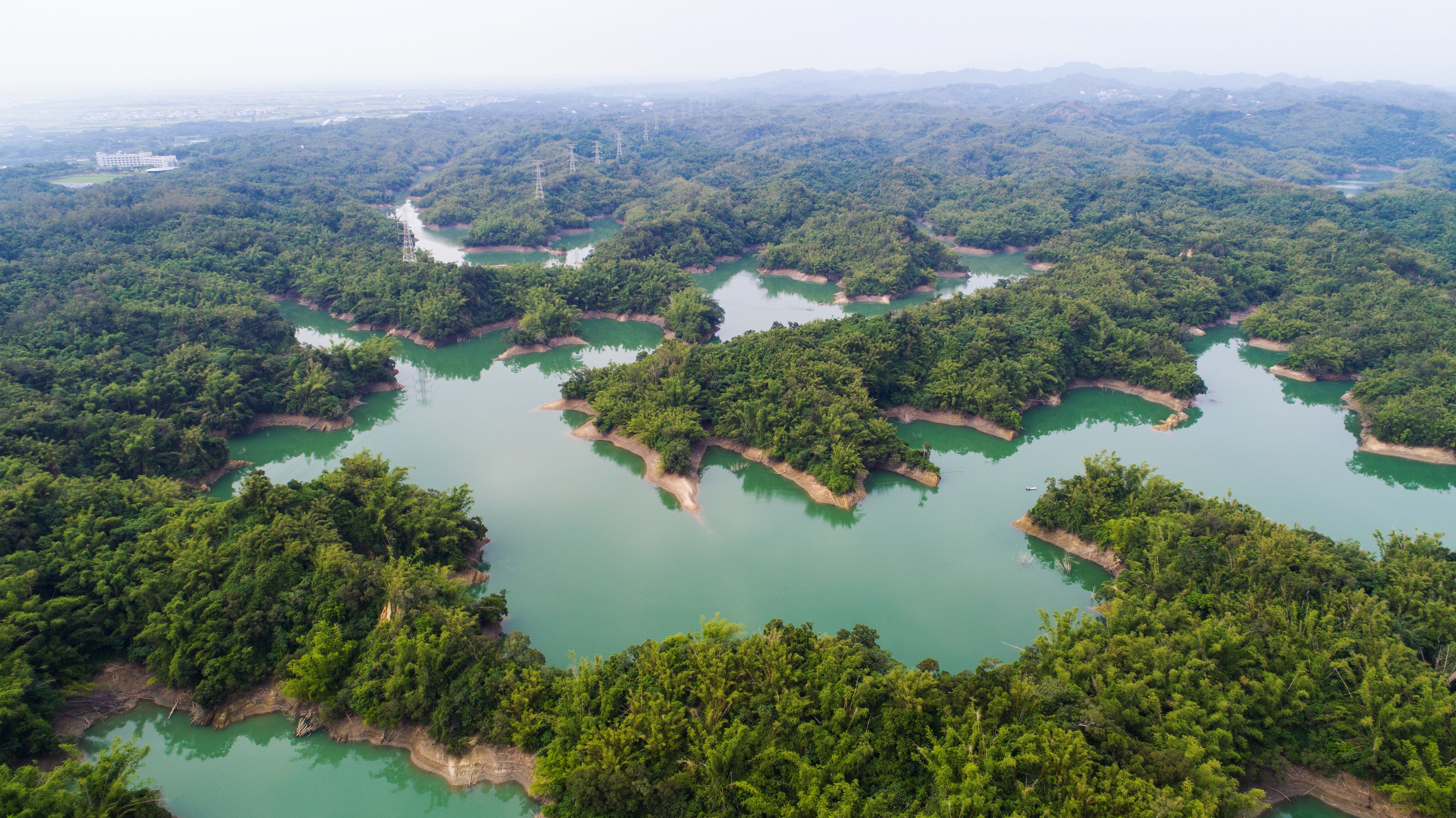
Wusanto Reservoir

Siraya National Scenic Area (Chinese: 西拉雅國家風景區; pinyin: Xīlāyǎ Guójiā Fēngjǐng Qū) is the newest of Taiwan's national scenic areas. It was designated by the central government of the Republic of China on 26 November 2005.

The scenic area is named after the Siraya people, an indigenous ethnic group that populated this region until well into the 18th century, and whose descendants have intermarried with Han Chinese.

The scenic area covers 13 districts/townships: 12 in Tainan City and one, Dapu, in Chiayi County.

Among the area's attractions are Zengwun Dam, Wusanto Reservoir, and the coffee plantations of Dongshan.

== See also ==
- List of national parks in Taiwan
- List of tourist attractions in Taiwan
