= Maolin National Scenic Area =

National scenic area in Taiwan

- 茂林國家風景區
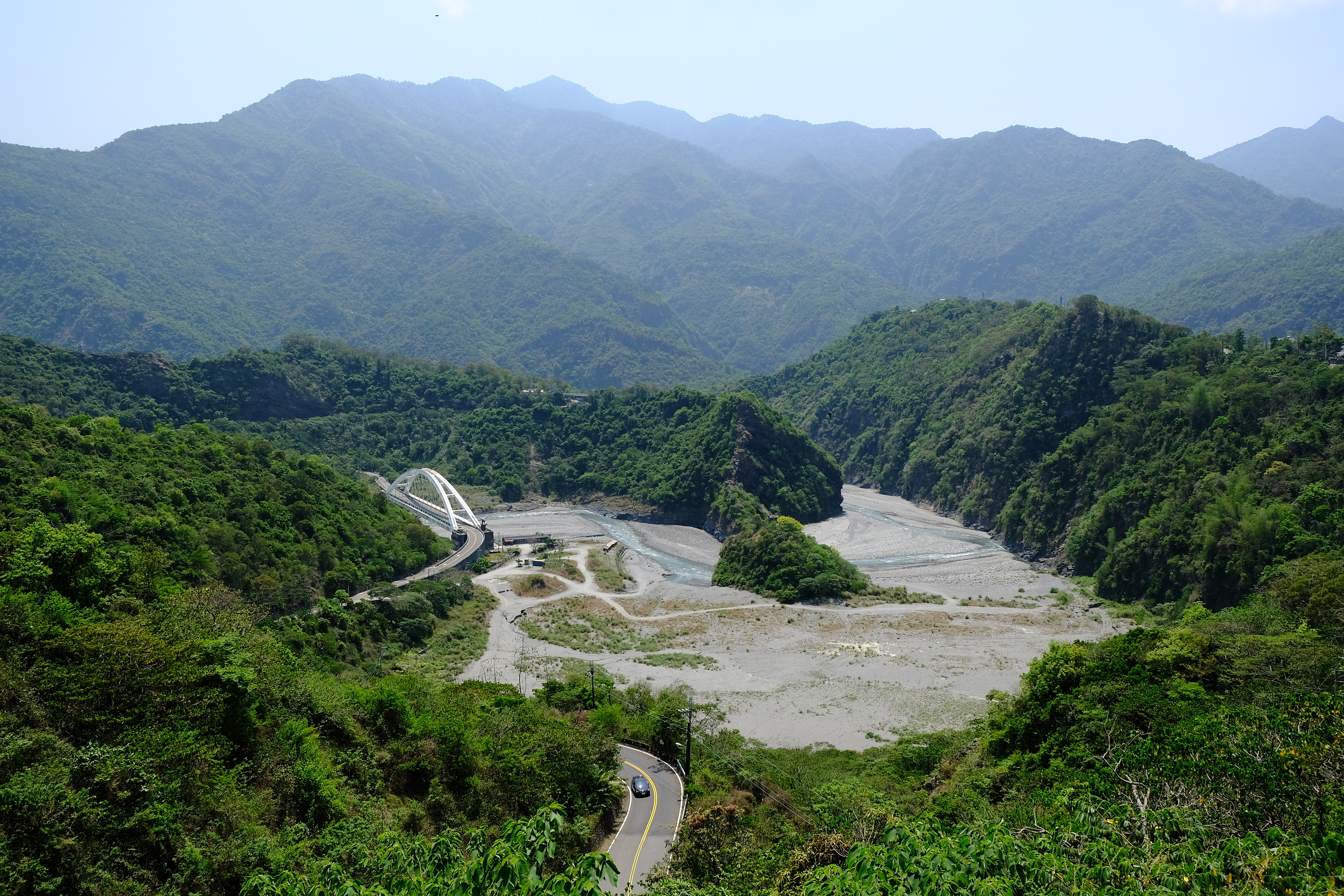

- Location within Taiwan
- Location: Kaohsiung and Pingtung County, Taiwan
- Coordinates: 22°52′50.6″N 120°39′01.0″E
- Operator: Maolin National Scenic Area Administration

The Maolin National Scenic Area (traditional Chinese: 茂林國家風景區; simplified Chinese: 茂林国家风景区; pinyin: Màolín Guójiā Fēngjǐng Qū) is a national scenic area in Kaohsiung and Pingtung County of Taiwan.

== Geology ==
The scenic area is located at the western side of Central Mountain Range foothill which covers three rivers. It is located within the boundary of Sandimen Township of Pingtung County and Maolin and Liouguei districts of Kaohsiung City. The average temperature of the area is 24 °C.

== Facilities ==
The scenic area features various hotels and other lodging facilities.

== Seasonal Activities ==
=== Austronesian Wedding (March) ===
The Austronesian wedding ceremony is a seasonal activity which combined with the traditional wedding of the aborigines based on the Majia Township of the Northern Pingtung, Sandimen Township, Paiwan of Wutai Township and Rukai, presented by Maolin National Scenic Area Management Office.

=== Purple Crow Butterflies Watching (November to March) ===
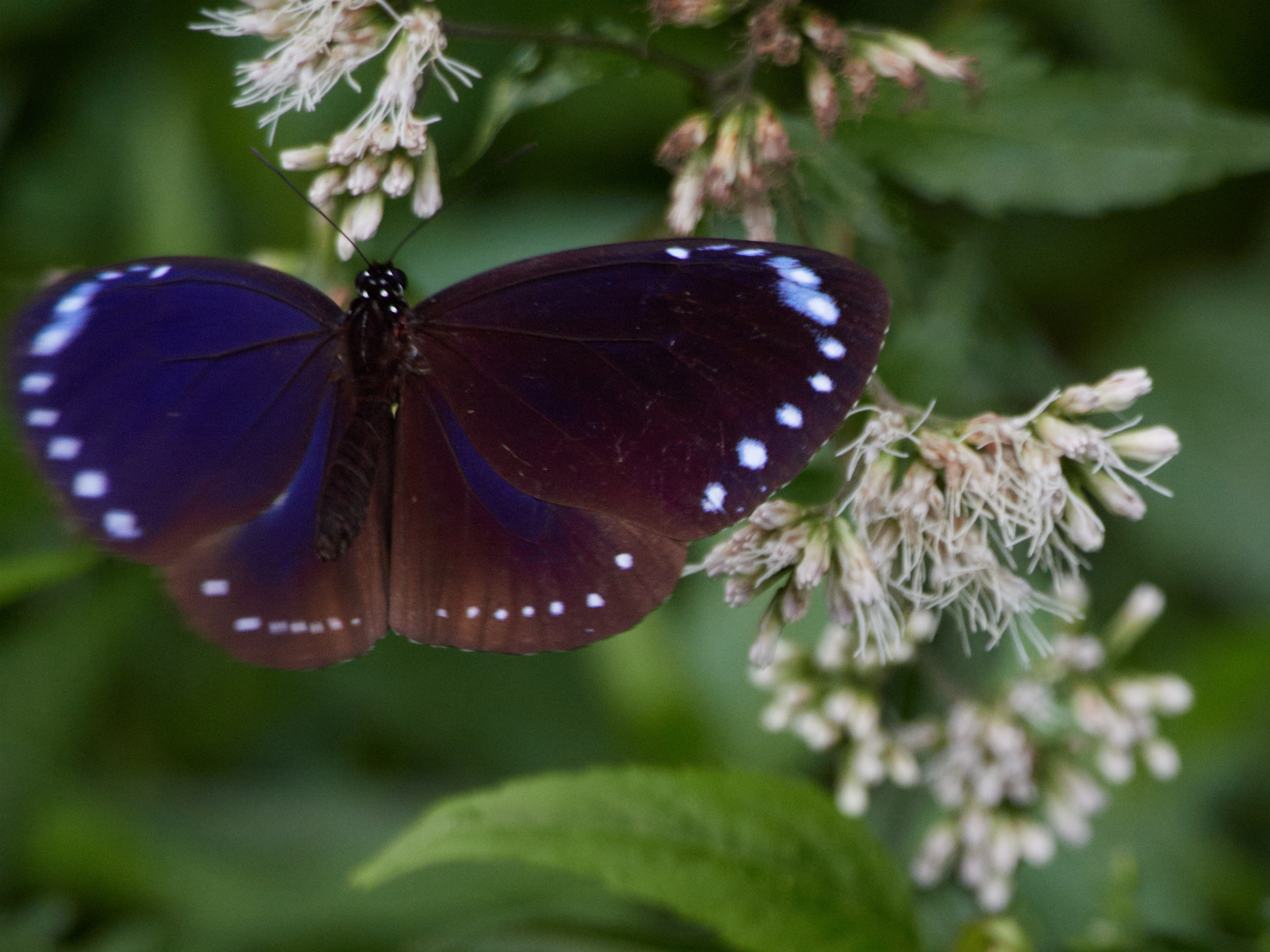
A Purple crow butterfly resting on white wildflowers.

Every year in winter, the highlight of the Maolin National Scenic Area is the arrival of thousands and thousands of purple crow butterflies across the ocean to stay for the winter.

=== Fetrip of Whispering Flowers in the Mountains (November to January) ===
The Liouguei area of Kaohsiung County has the largest number of hot springs resources of all Southern Taiwan, and includes almost 40 hot spring hotels.

== Transportation ==
The area is accessible by bus from Kaohsiung Main Station.

== See also ==
- Geography of Taiwan
