= Southwest Coast National Scenic Area =

Protected area in Taiwan

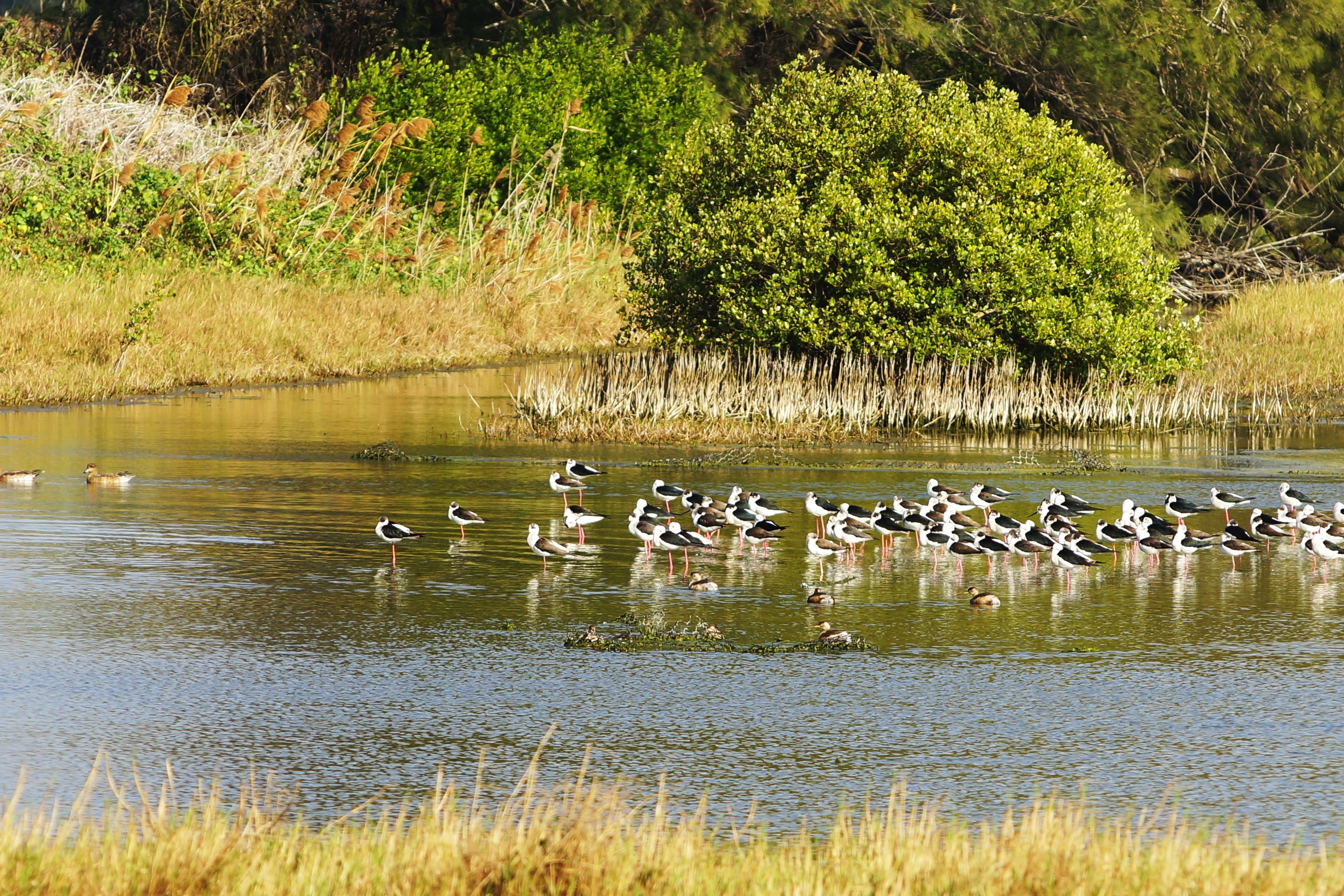
Aogu Wetland.

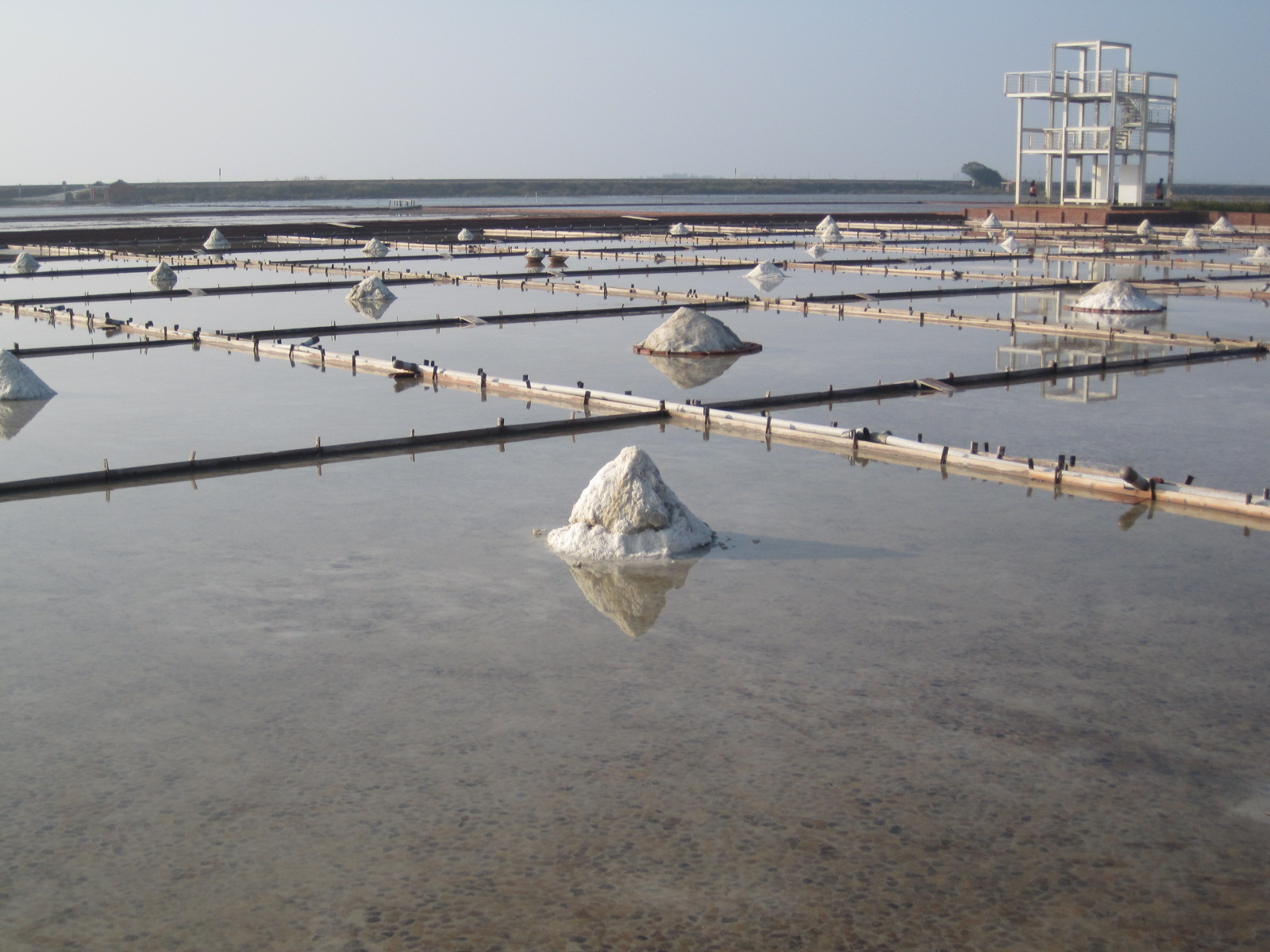
Salt ponds in Beimen, Tainan.

The Southwest Coast National Scenic Area (Chinese: 雲嘉南濱海國家風景區; pinyin: Yúnjiānán Bīnhǎi Guójiā Fēngjǐng Qū) is a national scenic area in Taiwan.

The scenic area, which was set up in November 2003, covers parts of Tainan City, Chiayi County, and Yunlin County. It promotes tourist attractions on land and at sea between Taiwan Highway 17 in the east, and where the ocean reaches a depth of 20 meters.

It includes the main winter habitat of the black-faced spoonbill, an endangered waterbird.

In addition to ecological attractions, the scenic area has several remnants of Taiwan's now-defunct salt industry.

The administrative headquarters are in Beimen District, in Tainan City.

== See also ==
- List of tourist attractions in Taiwan
