= Wazihwei Nature Reserve =

Forest in Bali, New Taipei, Taiwan

Wazihwei Nature Reserve Chinese: 挖子尾自然保留區
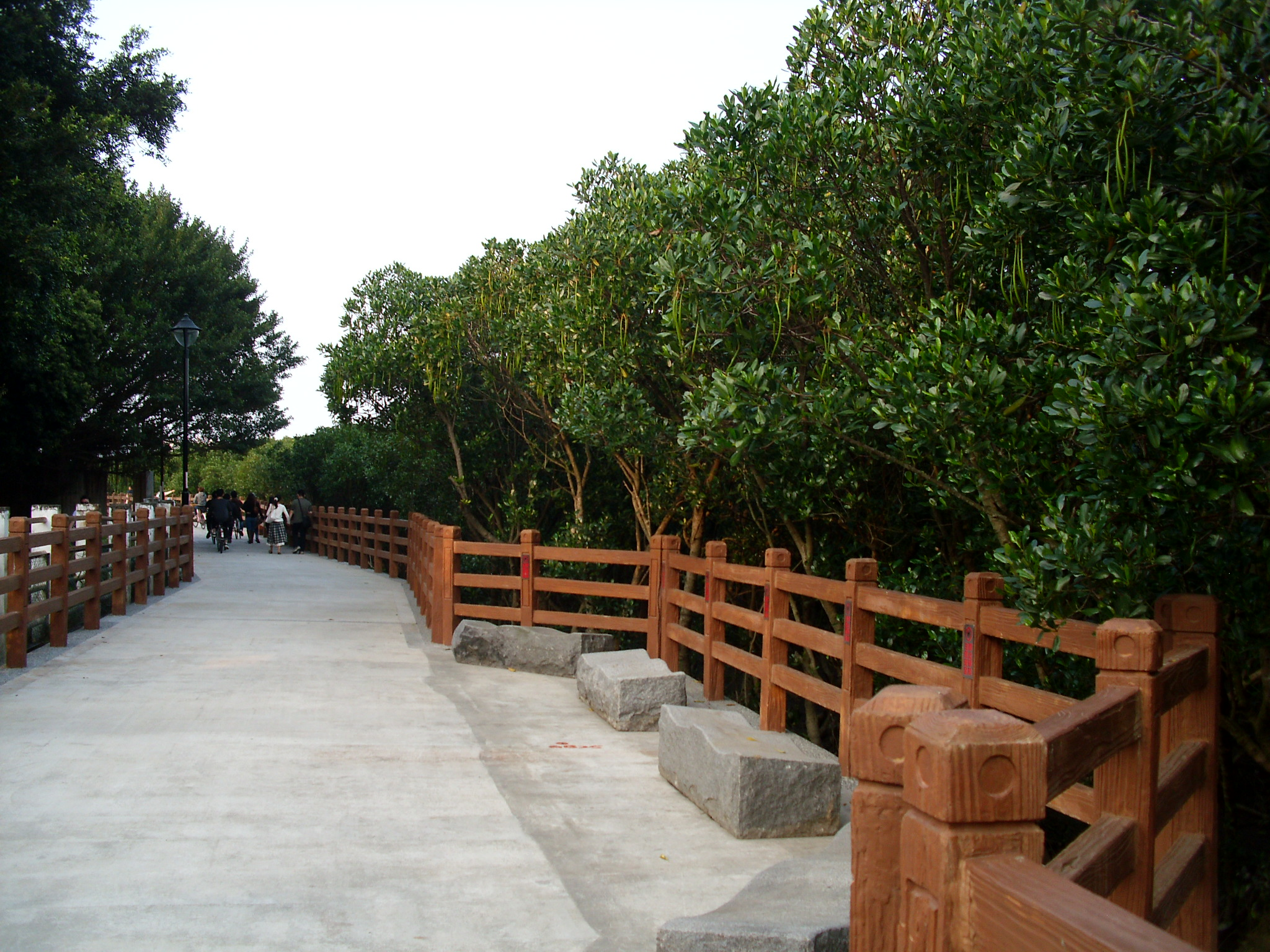

- Location within Taiwan
- Interactive map of Wazihwei Nature Reserve

Geography
- Location: Bali, New Taipei, Taiwan
- Coordinates: 25°9′59.2″N 121°24′59.1″E
- Area: 30 ha (74 acres)

Administration
- Established: 10 January 1994
- Authority: New Taipei City Government

Ecology
- Ecosystem: nature reserve

Wazihwei Nature Reserve (traditional Chinese: 挖子尾自然保留區; simplified Chinese: 挖子尾自然保留区; pinyin: Wāzǐwěi Zìrán Bǎoliú Qū) is a nature reserve in Bali District, New Taipei, Taiwan. It is home to egrets, mudskippers, and fiddler crabs.

== History ==
The area was declared as a nature reserve by the Council of Agriculture on 10 January 1994 in order to prevent further damaging to the ecosystem due to the water pollution from Tamsui River.

== Geography ==
The nature reserve is located at the tidal area of Tamsui River bank. It consists of mangrove, mudflats and swamp.

== See also ==
- Geography of Taiwan
