= Kou Chou Ching =

Taiwanese band

Kou Chou Ching 拷秋勤
- Born: Republic of China
- Years active: 2003–present
- Member of: Chu Pi (Hakka language vocals) fishLIN (Taiwanese Vocals); J-CHEN (DJ, Tour Leader)
- Formerly of: Fan Jiang (Hakka vocalist, left the band at the end of 2013); Yubo (leaving the tour in April 2019); Chicken (musician, instrumental arranger, departure time unknown)

Kou Chou Ching (Mandarin: 拷秋勤) is a local Taiwanese band founded in 2003, is known for its public commentaries on current affairs since 2014, its 2020 hiatus and reorganization, and its 2022 comeback. The band's music style is mainly hip-hop, with elements of local music. The lyrics are mostly in Taiwanese and Hakka, describing the local society. The current members of the band are fishLIN, Zhu Pei and J.CHEN.

== Course ==
Kou Chou Ching was formed in the summer of 2003 by five members: vocalists fishLIN (Mandarin: 魚仔林), Fan Jiang (Mandarin: 范姜), DJ J-CHEN, and two musicians Achino (Mandarin: 阿雞), and Yubao (Mandarin: 尤寶).

Kou Chou Ching was formed in the summer of 2003 by fishLIN, Fan Jiang (Mandarin: Fan Jiang) and friend Ade (Mandarin: Ade), who left the band at the end of 2003 due to his studies; DJ J-CHEN joined the band in 2004, a renaissance art graduate who specializes in Scratch;In 2005, Achino and Yubao joined the band, mainly using traditional instruments such as the cymbal and clapper as their instruments; by now, Kou Chou Ching had officially established the group's shape.

In the summer of 2005, Kou Chou Ching gathered all the tracks they had composed at that time and independently released the EP collection "Repeat" (Mandarin: 復刻), limited to 1,000 copies.In 2007, Kou Chou Ching received a grant from the Executive Yuan News Bureau to record and release the official album "KOU!! It's Coming Out!!! (Mandarin: 拷!!出來了!!!)."

Kou Chou Ching's music utilizes a lot of local material from Taiwan, including the Nanguan, Beiguan, Hakka Banyan, Taiwanese opera, persuasive songs, folk ballads, as well as Taiwanese oldies from the 40's to the 70's, and even recent compositions, etc., which have all served as the source of the band's music production. Kou Chou Ching's Hip Hop music draws heavily from European and American Funk, Jazz, and other black music sources, and in the same spirit, Kou Chou Ching absorbs Taiwan's local music, which has been nourished by the land of Taiwan.

Kou Chou Ching's lyrics are based on Taiwan's events, such as beautiful landscapes and childhood life, and emphasize the unity of ethnic groups, reflecting on history, as well as calling for the protection of the environment and ecology, and the preservation of cultural assets, with the main theme of exhorting people to do good, caring for the community, and being united as one.

In 2007, the band was shortlisted for Best Band/Best Taiwanese Album at the Golden Melody Awards; in 2009, the band was shortlisted for Best Band at the Golden Melody Awards, and Best Sound Mixing and Best Group at the JPF Awards, which was the first time for a Taiwanese band to win the independent music awards; and in 2012, the band was shortlisted for Best Package/Best Taiwanese Album at the Golden Indie Music Awards; the band's original leader, Fan Chiang, left the band in 2013, and joined the band in 2015, with new Hakka vocalist, Zhu Pei. New Hakka vocalist Zhu Pei. In recent years, the band has been involved in social movement performances, and some of its members have formed an ensemble called Community Service (Mandarin: 勞動服務).

== Members ==
The members of the group are fishLIN, Pigskin and J.CHEN.

- fishLIN, Originally the group's lyricist and Taiwanese vocalist, He quit the band on April 13, 2019, and returned in 2020. Meanwhile, he is a Rapper of another band, Community Service, and works as a staff member at the Shihsanhang Museum of Archeology.
- Pigskin, the lead singer of the group's Hakka language (Northern Four Counties accent), is a graduate of the Department of Performing Arts at Chongyou Institute of Technology, and a graduate of the Department of Hakka Literature at National Central University
- J.CHEN, a brand designer, is the group's DJ and brand designer, graduated from the Department of Advertising of Fuxing Commercial and Industrial College and the Department of Multimedia Design of Hochun Technical College. He is also the founder of Inland Rock (Mandarin: 內地搖滾) and the head of Radical Studio (Mandarin: 激進工作室). He participated in the Sunflower Movement and was charged with obstruction of liberty and public safety in 2014 for blocking Zhang Zhijun's convoy, but was acquitted in 2017.

== Controversy ==
Kou Chou Ching is an active participant in social movements.they once wore an anti-nuclear suit on the Walk of Fame at the 24th Golden Melody Awards in the Pop Music category at the Taipei Arena.

"Whenever a parade uses this song as the finale, it will be like this! Before he sang "Civil Revolt" (Mandarin: 官逼民反), Fish pointed out that the song was used as the grand finale for the "Demolish the Government on August 18, 2013, when the Rural Front held a rally at Kai Dao, and the "Anti-Under the table trade pact."(Mandarin: 反黑箱服貿 ), rally held next to the Legislative Yuan on March 18, 2014, after which crowds occupied the Ministry of the Interior and the Legislative Yuan respectively. "But fortunately we are not the grand finale today, so please don't be nervous, Mr. Policeman," said the crowd, who were laughing and clapping at the same time.

On Facebook, Kou Chou Ching criticized the 25th Golden Melody Awards as "a night of golden songs that flattered the Chinese government", saying that all the arrangements made by the organizers, including the hosts, the Secretary of Culture Long Yingtai, and the winners, were made because of their political stance and to flatter the Chinese government. The group criticized the New Artist Award winner, Lee Wing Ho, for being "a friend from Beijing, China who doesn't know anyone" and for "allegedly plagiarizing a song from John Mayer", and criticized performer Tian Fuzhen for changing her vocals and constantly rolling her tongue in a Chinese accent.
