= Bali District =

District in New Taipei, Taiwan

Bali 八里區
- District
- Bali District
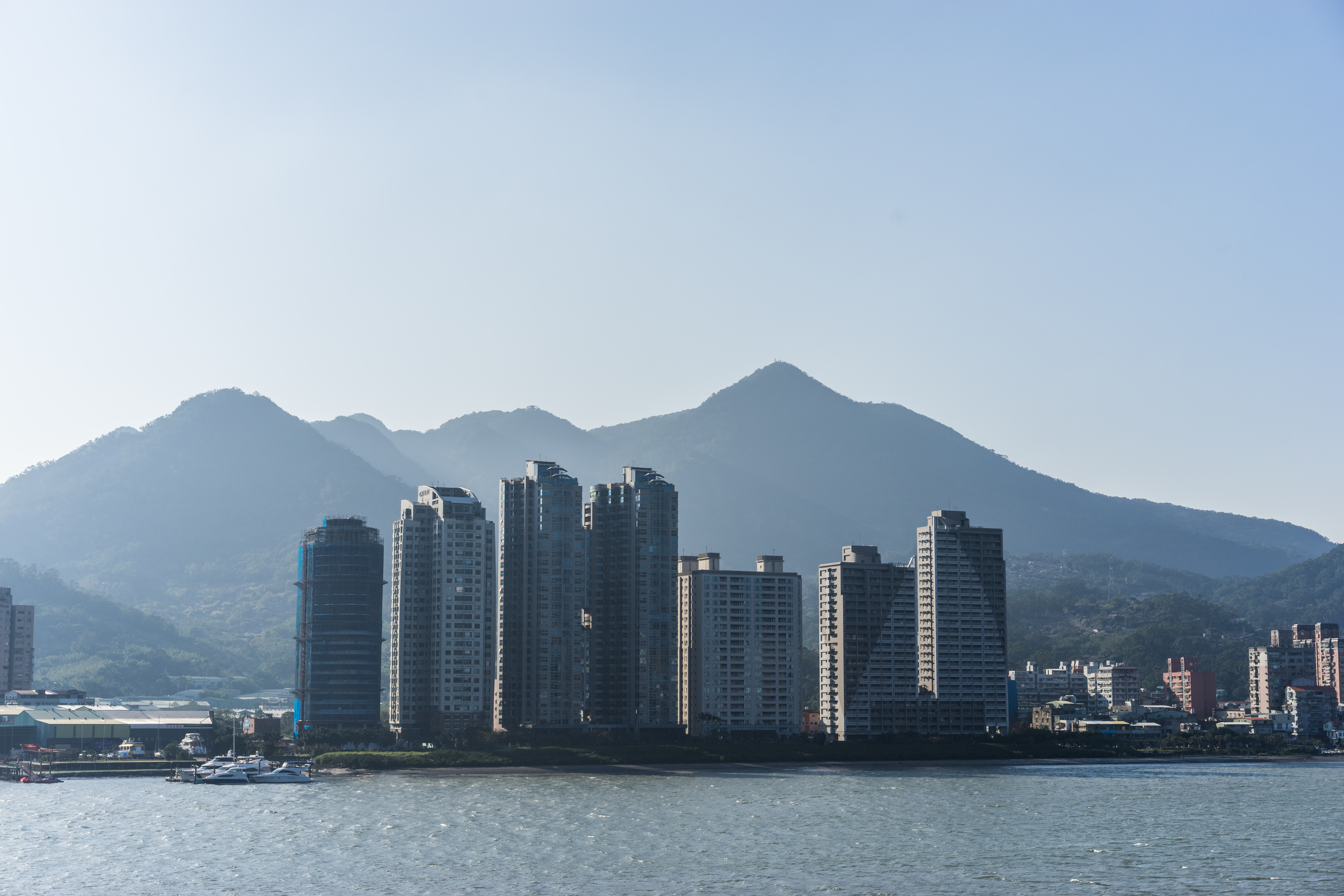
- Cityscape of Bali

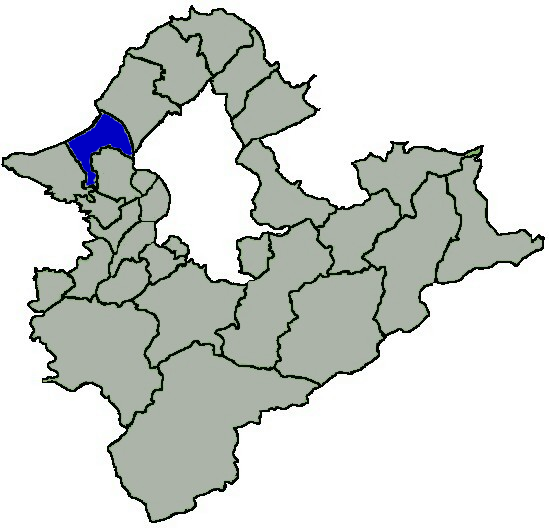
- Bali District in New Taipei City
- Coordinates: 25°9′N 121°24′E
- Country: Republic of China (Taiwan)
- City: New Taipei City

Area
  - Total: 15.25 sq mi (39.49 km^{2})

Population (March 2025)
  - Total: 40,259
- Time zone: UTC+8
- Website: www.bali.ntpc.gov.tw (in Chinese)

Bali (Chinese: 八里區; pinyin: Bālǐ Qū; Pe̍h-ōe-jī: Pat-lí-khu) is a suburban district in northwestern New Taipei, Taiwan. In Taiwanese Hokkien, it was known as Pat-lí-hun (八里坌) during the rule of the Qing dynasty.

== History ==
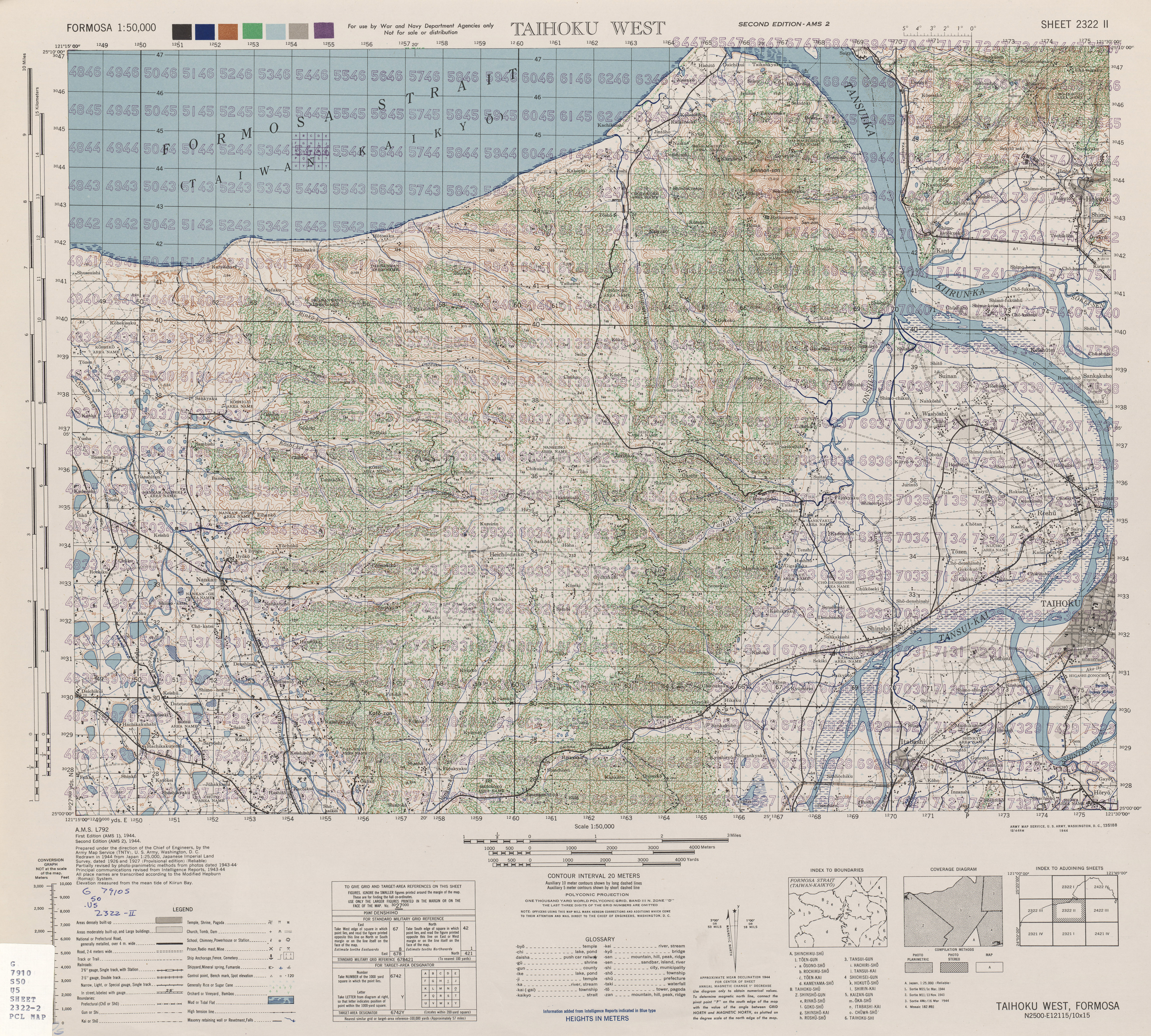
Map including Bali (labeled as Hachirifun) (1944)

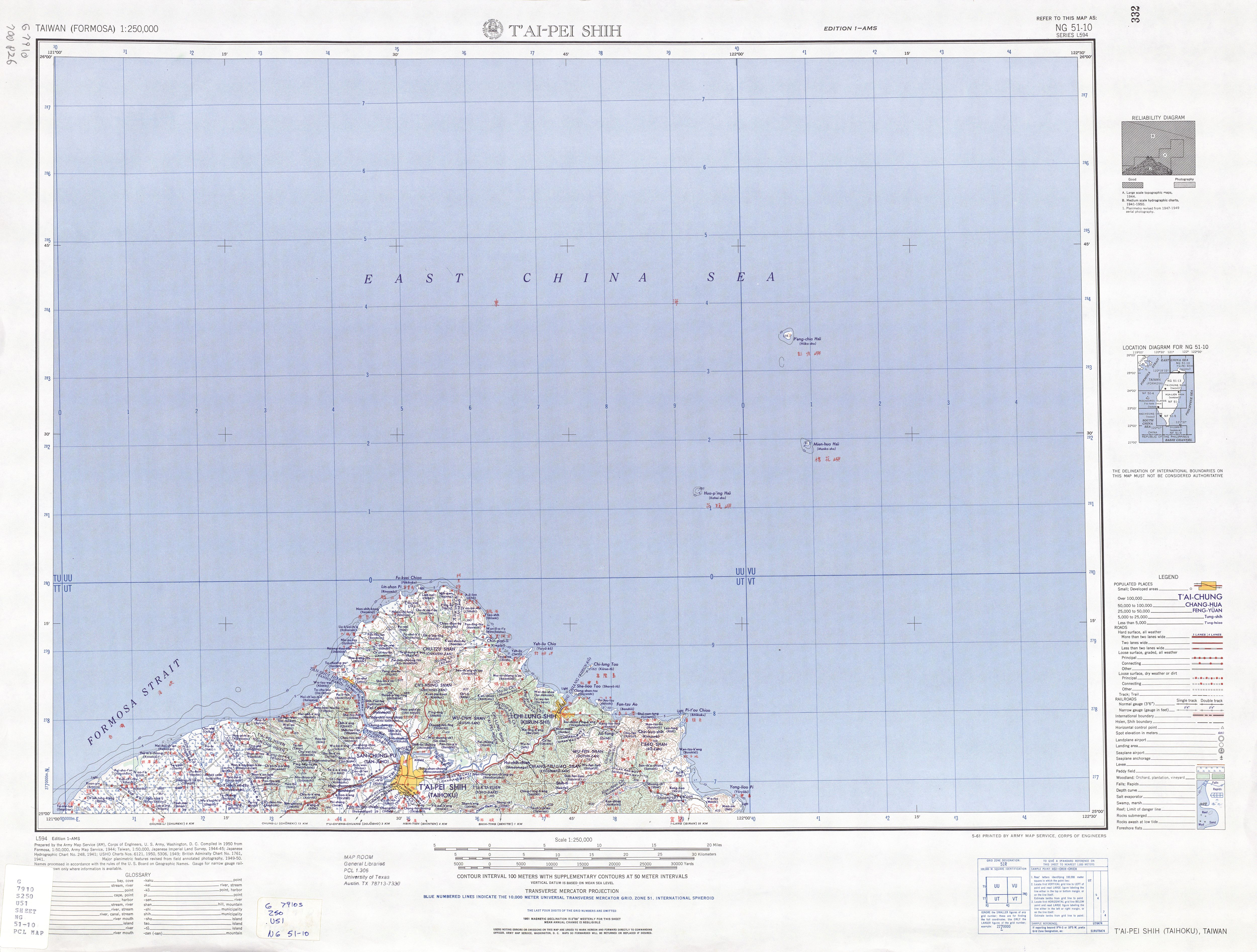
Map including Bali (labeled as Pa-li-fen (Hachirifun) 八里坌) (1950)

Based on examinations of grave goods it is believed that the ancient settlement of Shihsanhang was one of the wealthiest in Taiwan, it was only one of two communities in prehistoric Taiwan to master iron smelting. The ironware they produced was traded throughout Taiwan.

During the period of Japanese rule, Bali was called Hachiri village (八里庄), and was governed under Tamsui District of Taihoku Prefecture. After the handover of Taiwan from Japan to the Republic of China in 1945, Bali became a rural township of Taipei County. On 25 December 2010, it became a district of New Taipei City.

== Administrative divisions ==
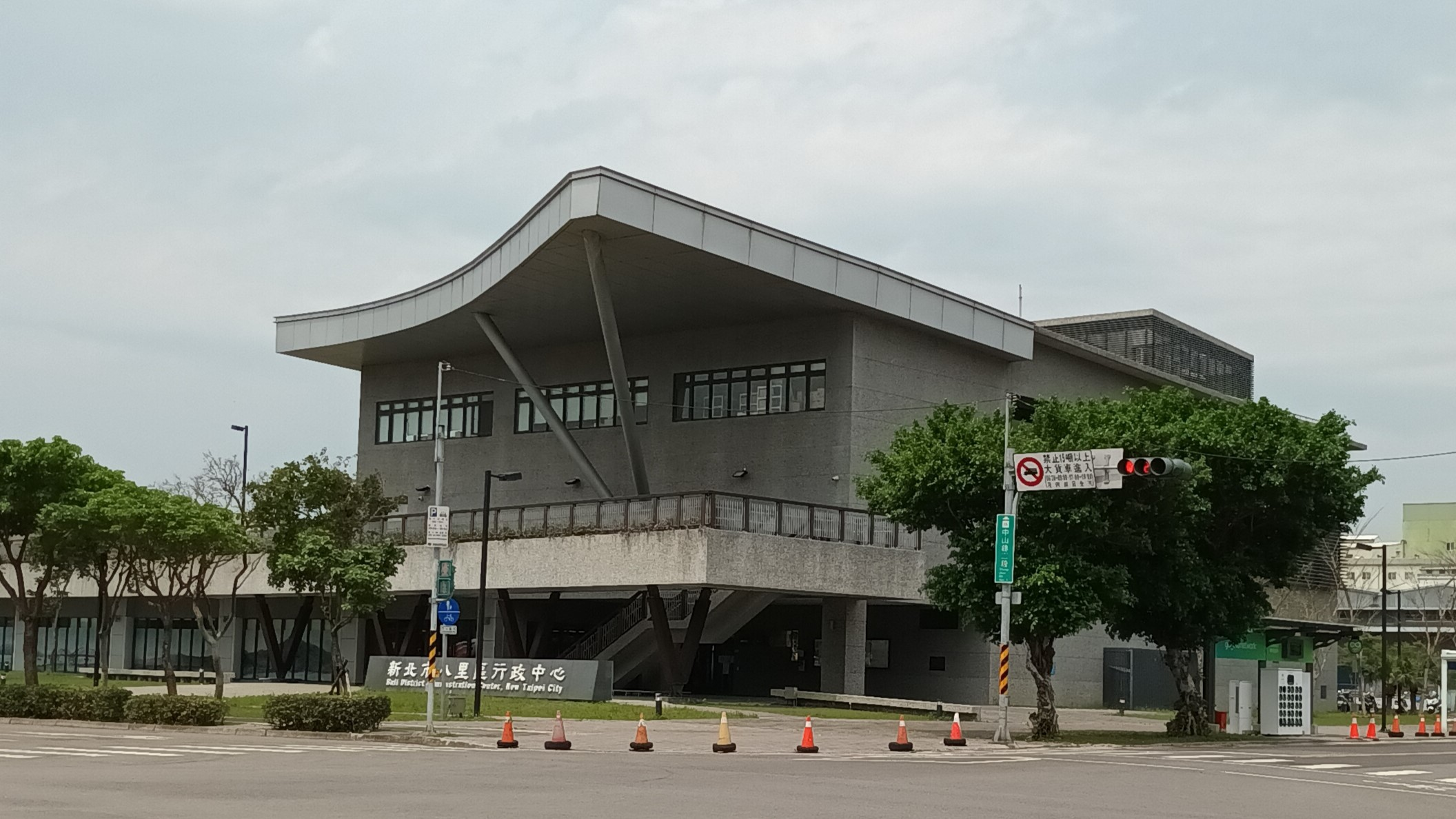
Bali District Office

Bali District administers ten urban villages:

- Longyuan (龍源里), Micang (米倉里), Dakan (大崁里), Pitou (埤頭里), Dinggu (頂罟里), Jiucheng (舊城里), Xuntang (訊塘里), Laoqian (荖阡里), Changkeng (長坑里) and Xiagu (下罟里).

== Education ==
Bali district has one high school, one municipal middle school, and five elementary schools, including the New Taipei Municipal DaKan Elementary School.

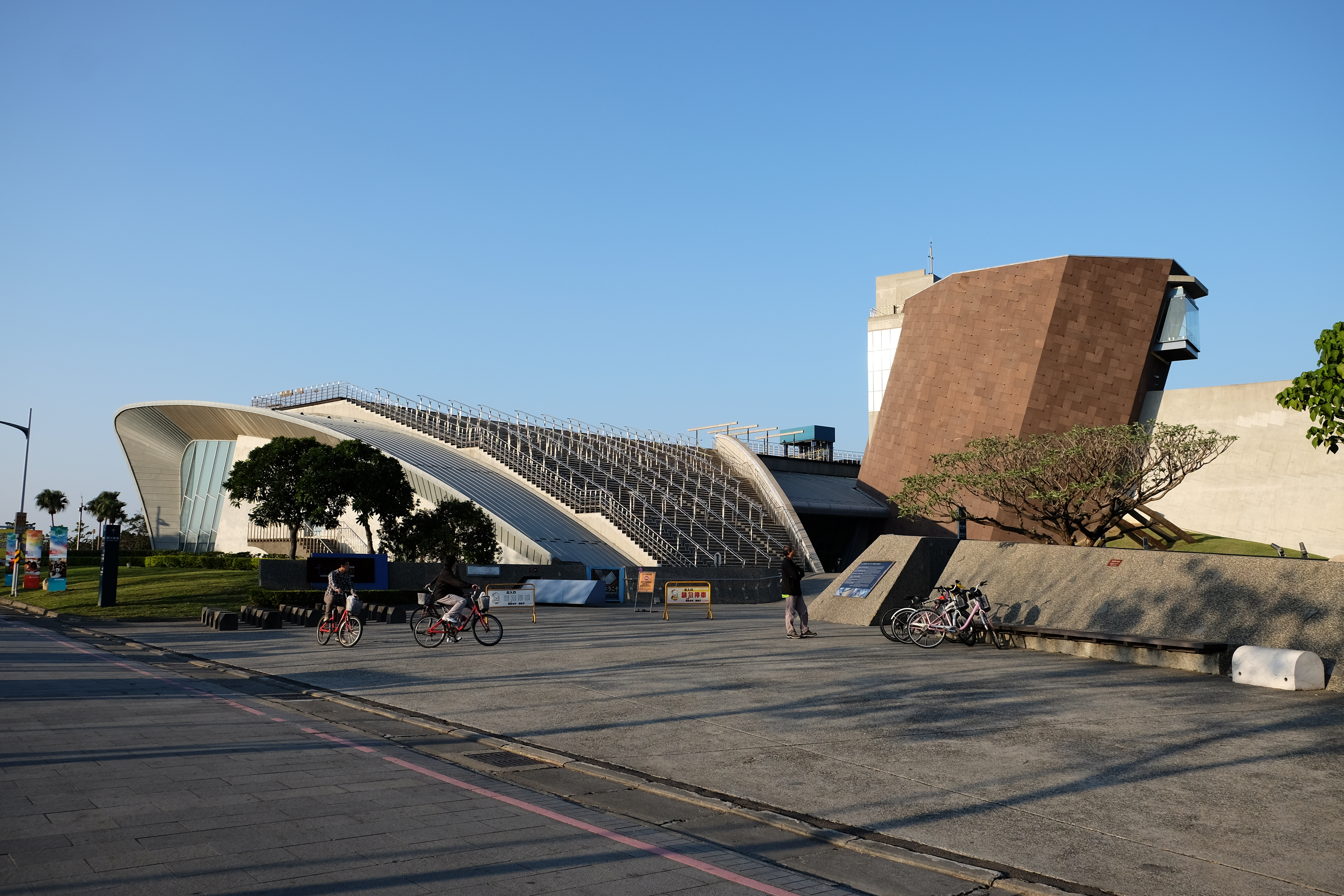
Shihsanhang Museum of Archaeology

== Tourist attractions ==
- Shihsanhang Museum of Archaeology
- Sustainable Development Education Center
- Wazihwei Nature Reserve
- Bali Old Street
- Bali Left Bank Park
- Bali Sailing Pier
- Shisanhang Cultural Park
- New Taipei City Archeology Park
- Bali Shanggang Park (八里商港公園)
- Danjiang Bridge Vision Pavilion

== Transportation ==
- Port of Taipei
- Provincial Highways 15, 61 and 64, and City Route 105
- Bali Ferryboat Wharf
- Bali light rail (Expected to open in 2024 at the earliest)
