= Bitan =

Tourist spot in Xindian, New Taipei, Taiwan

Coordinates: 24°57′26.06″N 121°32′09.47″E

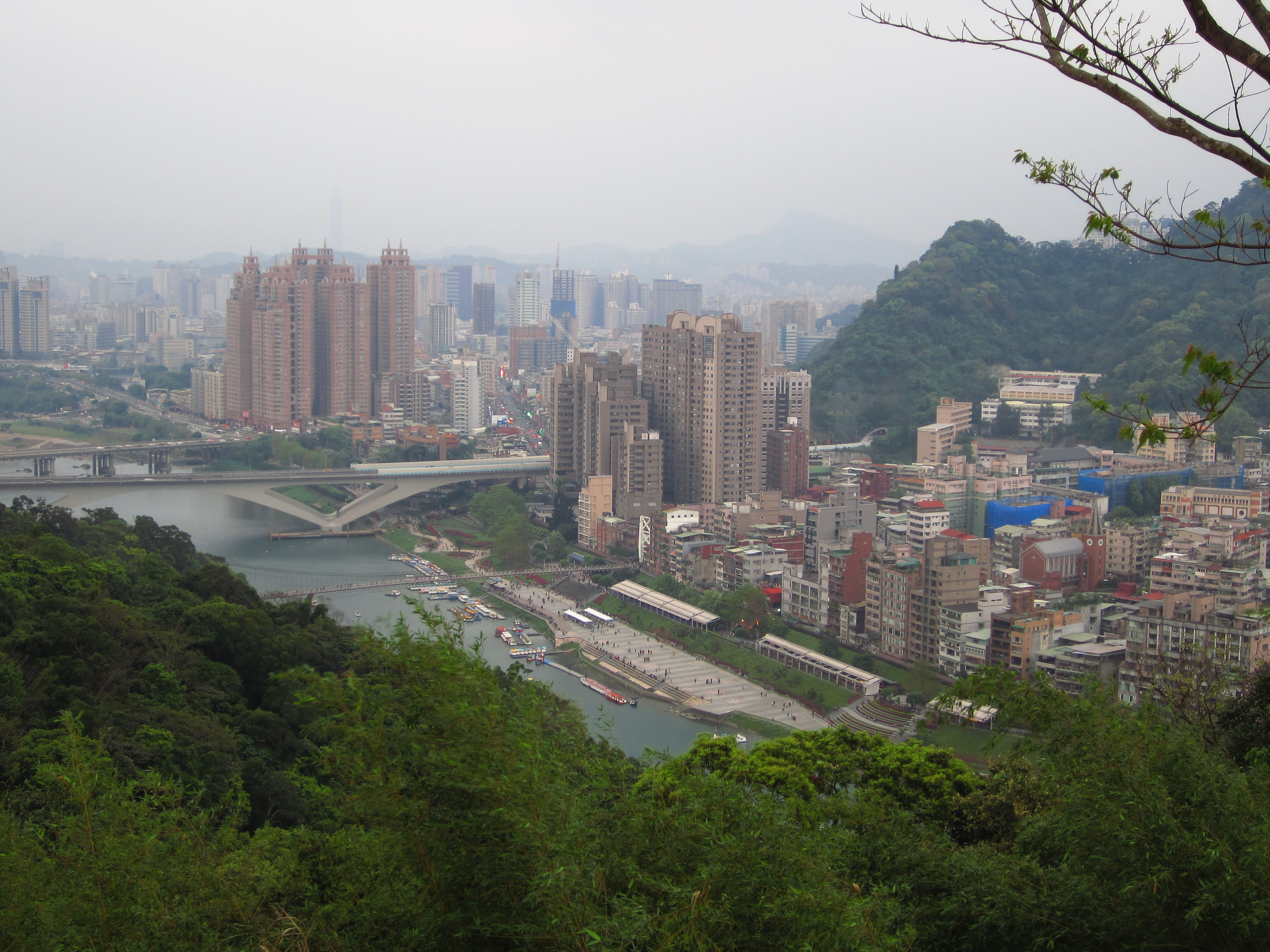
Skyline of Bitan

Bitan (Chinese: 碧潭; pinyin: Bìtán; Wade–Giles: Pi^{4}-t'an^{2}), historically called Shi-Bitan (Chinese: 石碧潭; pinyin: Shíbìtán), is a tourist spot in Xindian District, New Taipei, Taiwan. "Bitan" literally means "green lake", referring to where the Xindian River widens to form the lake. There is a well-known suspension bridge that is used only by pedestrians. The bridge can be seen on the crest of Xindian. It is both famous and infamous for its height and beauty. There are many restaurants, carnival activities, and pedal boats in the area.

== Transportation ==
Bitan can easily be reached via Taipei's metro system. The lake is walking distance southwest of the Xindian Station (south terminal station of the green line).

== See also ==
- New Taipei
