= Sustainable Development Education Center =

Educational center in Bali, New Taipei, Taiwan

- 永續環境教育中心
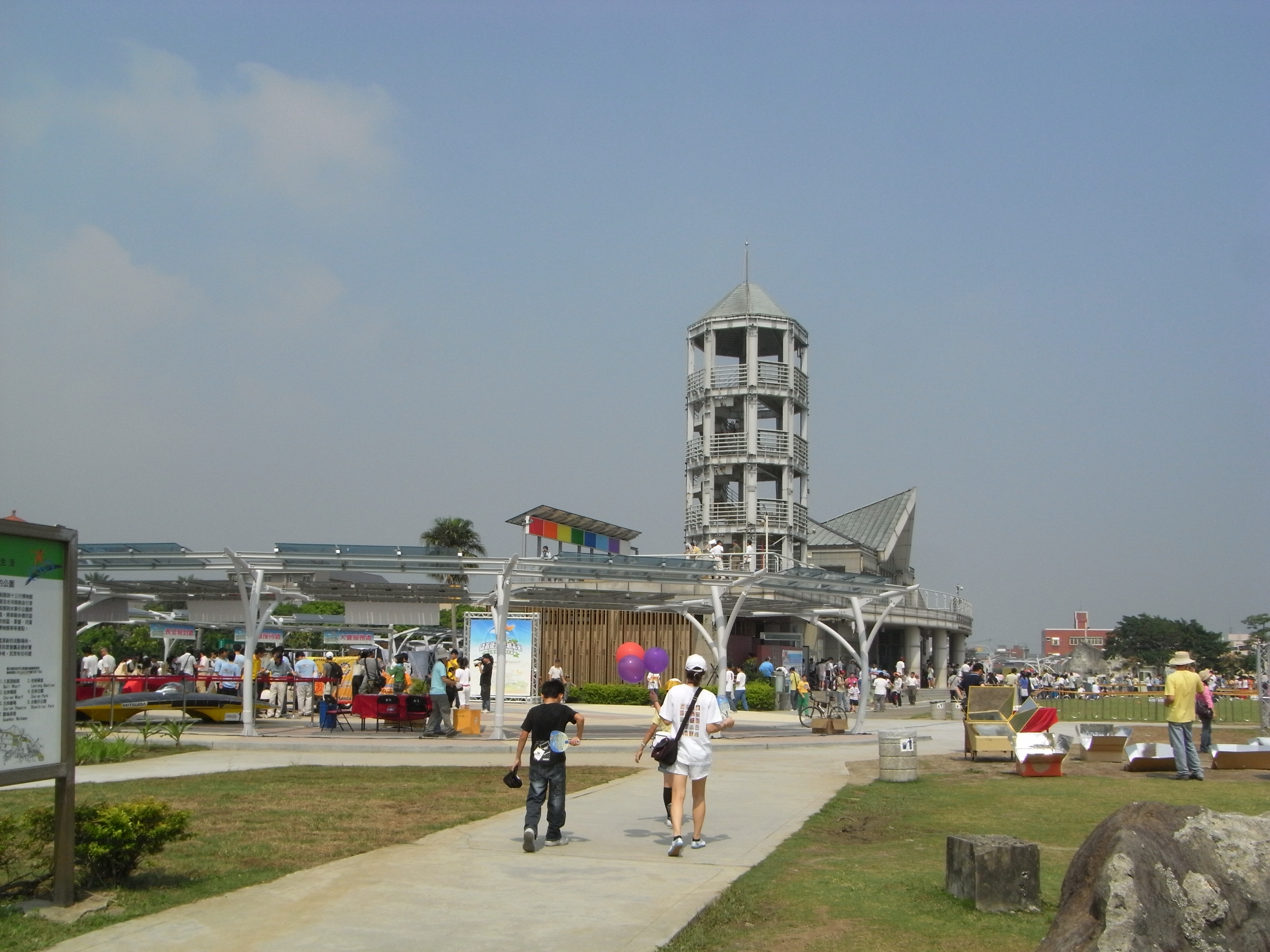
- Interactive map of the Sustainable Development Education Center area

General information
- Location: Bali, New Taipei, Taiwan
- Coordinates: 25°09′38.6″N 121°25′49.0″E
- Opened: January 2008

Technical details
- Floor area: 5,000 hectares

The Sustainable Development Education Center (traditional Chinese: 永續環境教育中心; simplified Chinese: 永续环境教育中心; pinyin: Yǒngxù Huánjìng Jiàoyù Zhōngxīn) is an educational center in Bali District, New Taipei, Taiwan.

== Architecture ==
The education center consists of an information desk, exhibition area and multipurpose classrooms educating on wetland management and the effects of global warming. It also has a viewing tower overlooking the Tamsui River.

== See also ==
- List of tourist attractions in Taiwan
- List of science centers#Asia
