= Tamsui Customs Wharf =

Wharf in Tamsui, New Taipei, Taiwan

Tamsui Customs Wharf 淡水海關碼頭
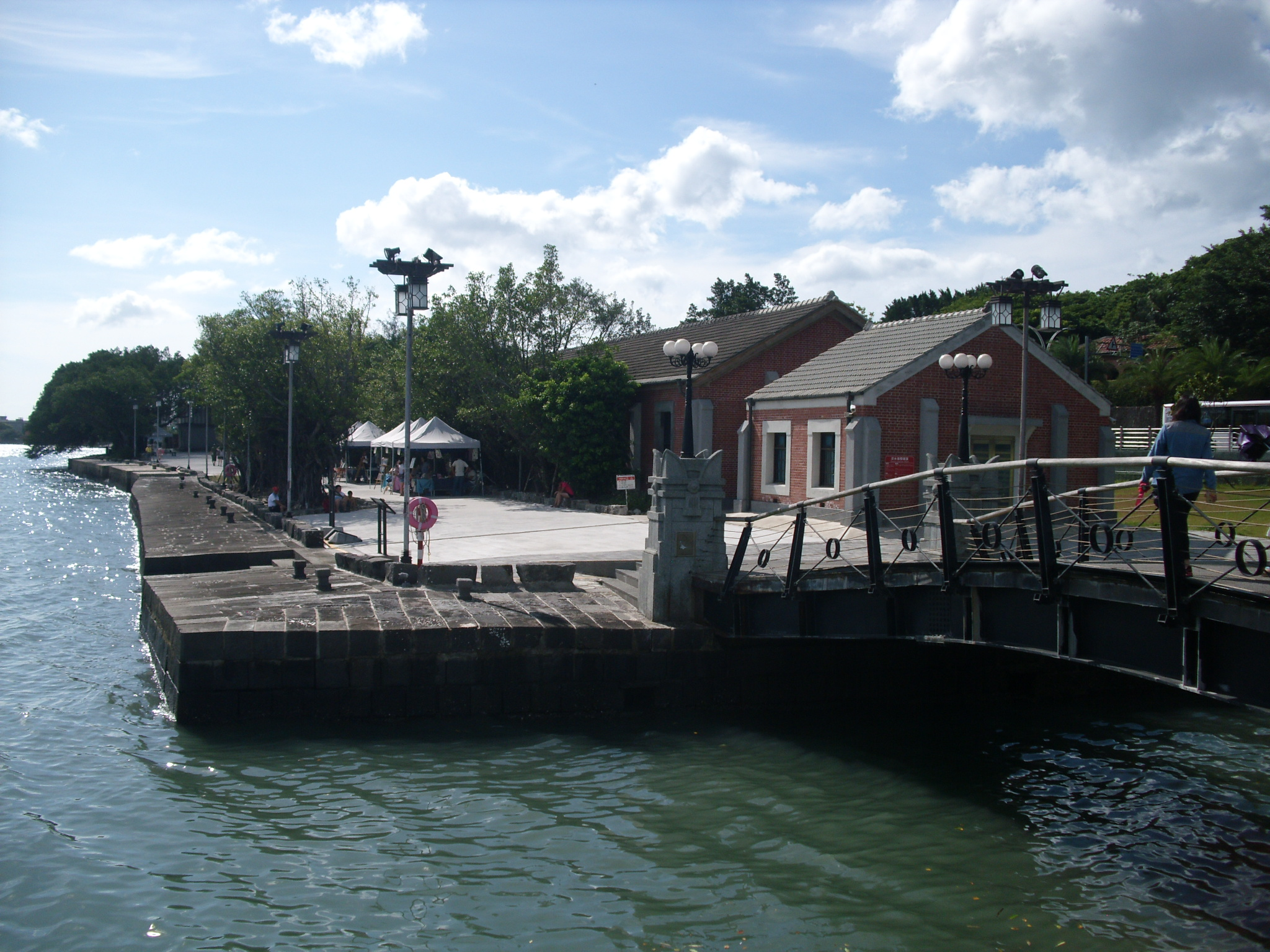
- Interactive map of Tamsui Customs Wharf 淡水海關碼頭

Location
- Location: Tamsui, New Taipei, Taiwan
- Coordinates: 25°10′28.2″N 121°25′54.3″E

Details
- Opened: 18 July 1862
- Type of harbour: wharf

The Tamsui Customs Wharf (traditional Chinese: 淡水海關碼頭; simplified Chinese: 淡水海关码头; pinyin: Dànshuǐ Hǎiguān Mǎtóu) is a wharf in Tamsui District, New Taipei, Taiwan. Until today, this is the only remaining pier in Taiwan built by the Qing Dynasty and being used as naval base today.

== History ==
In 1861, Qing Dynasty established a customhouse in Tamsui and the base became a pier. It began operating on 18 July 1862 as Huwei Port. On 5 August 1895, the custom was closed and handed over to Japan. The custom was then replaced by the custom in Dadaocheng, Taipei in 1916 and being renamed as Customs of Tamsui Branch, Taiwan Government Monopoly in 1920.

== Architecture ==
The wharf was constructed by piling up stones from Mount Guanyin in Wugu and it stretches up to 150 meters long.

== Transportation ==
The wharf is accessible within walking distance north west from Tamsui Station of Taipei Metro.

== See also ==
- List of tourist attractions in Taiwan
- Tamsui Fisherman's Wharf
