= New Taipei City =

Special municipality in Taiwan

New Taipei City 新北市 (Note: In local languages: Traditional Chinese script: 新北市; Mandarin Pinyin: Xīnběi Shì; Hokkien: Sin-pak Tshī; Sixian Hakka: Xín-běd Sii; Hailu Hakka: Sìn-bed Shi^{+}) Hsinpei City, Hsinpei, Hsin-Pei
- Special municipality
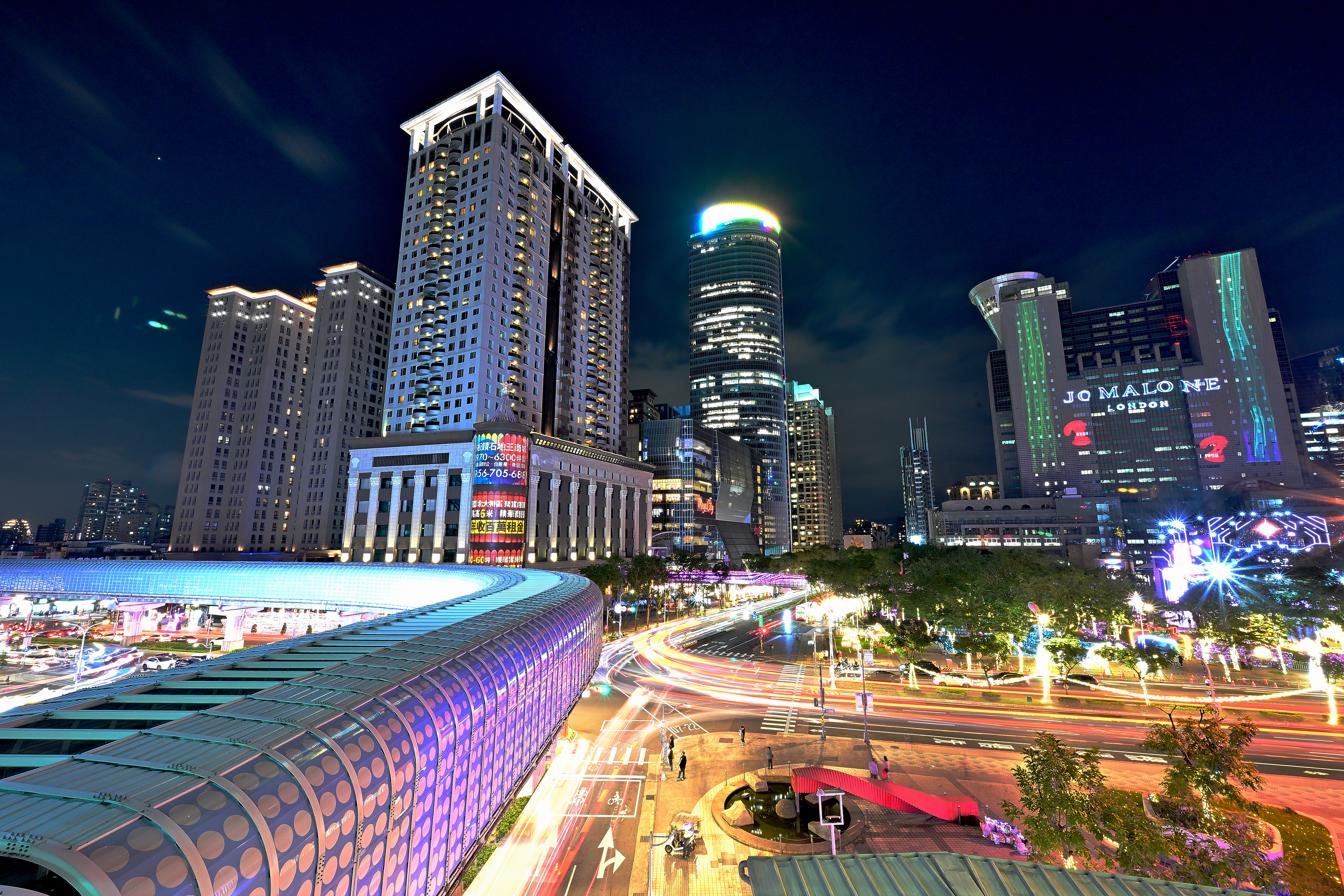
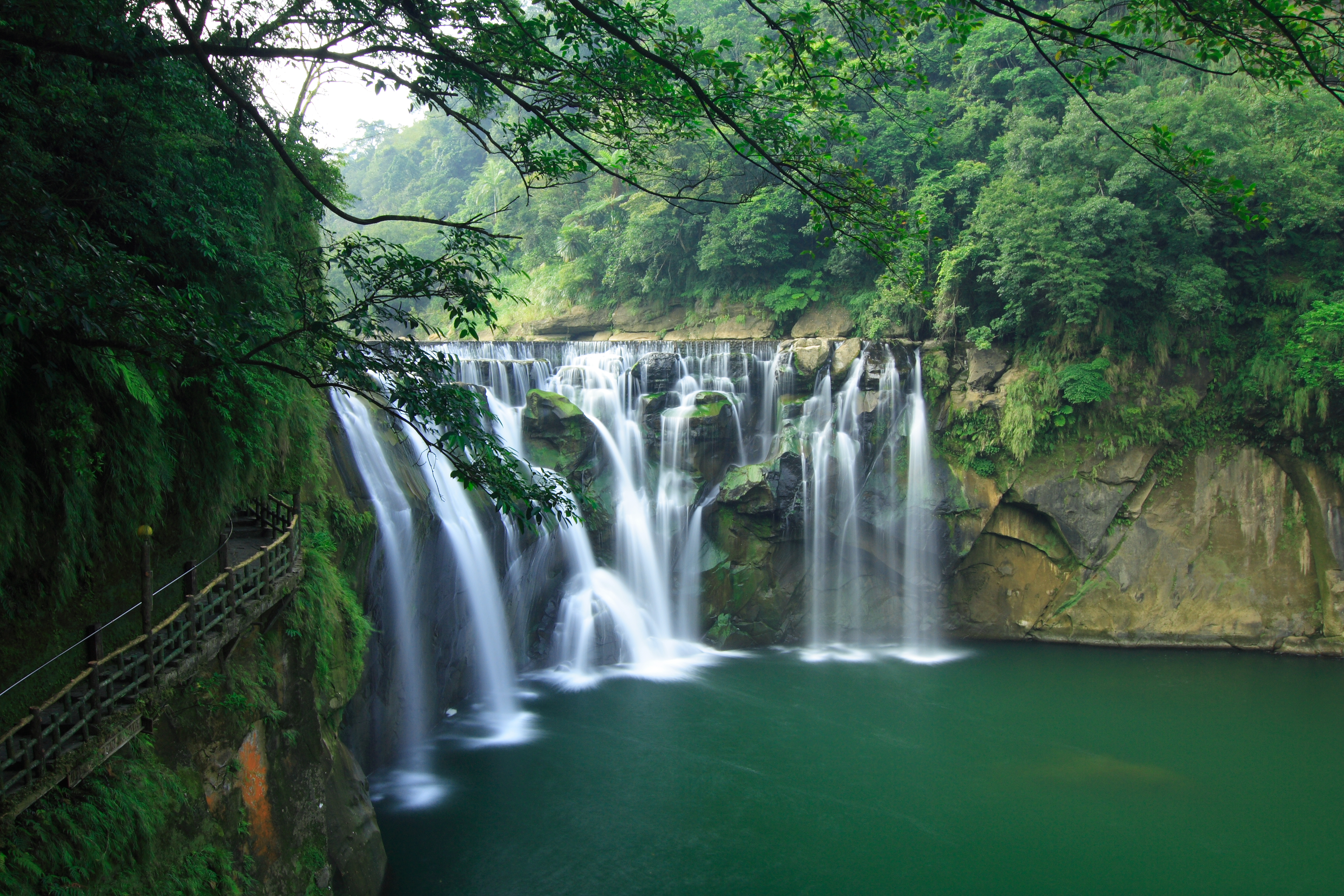
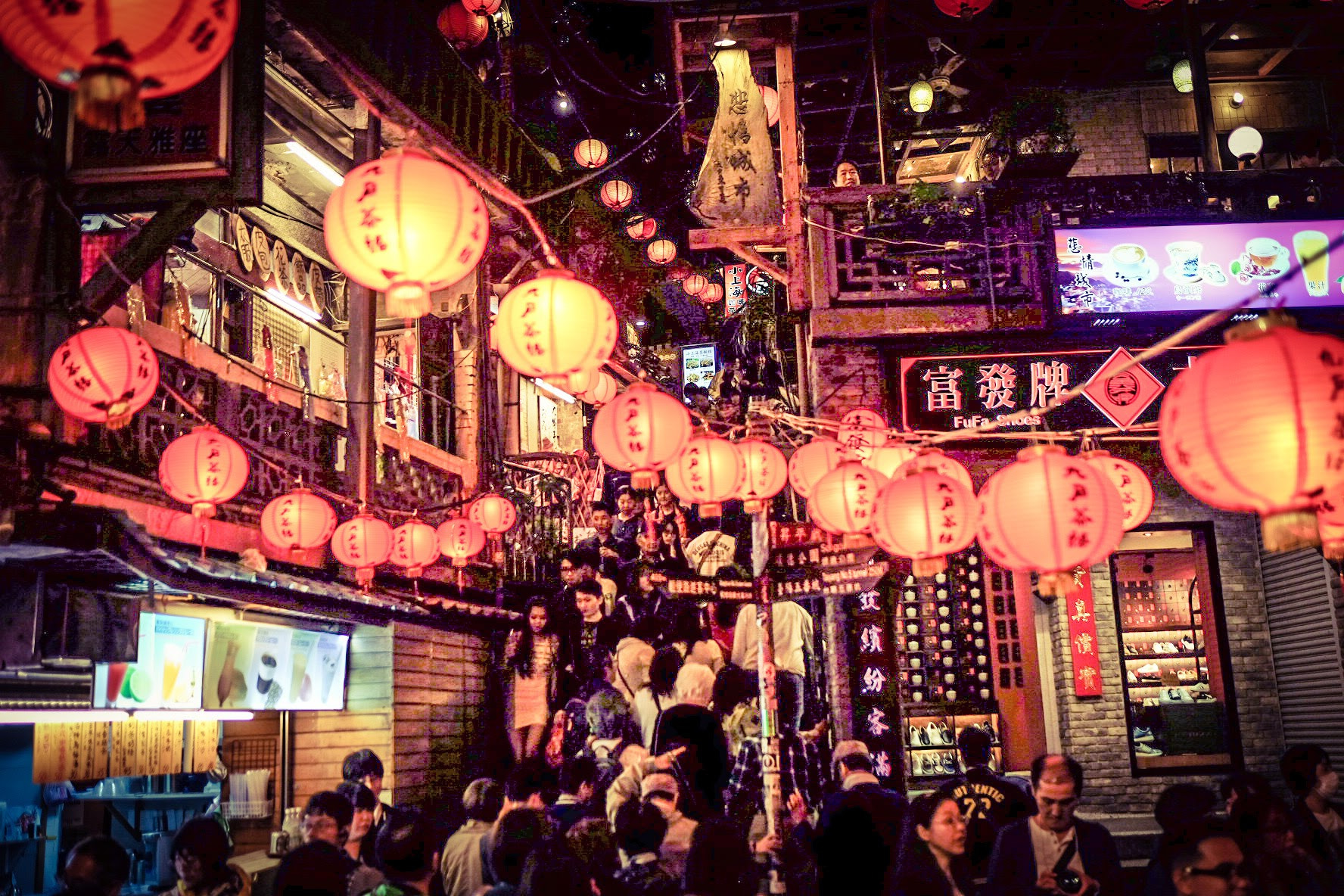
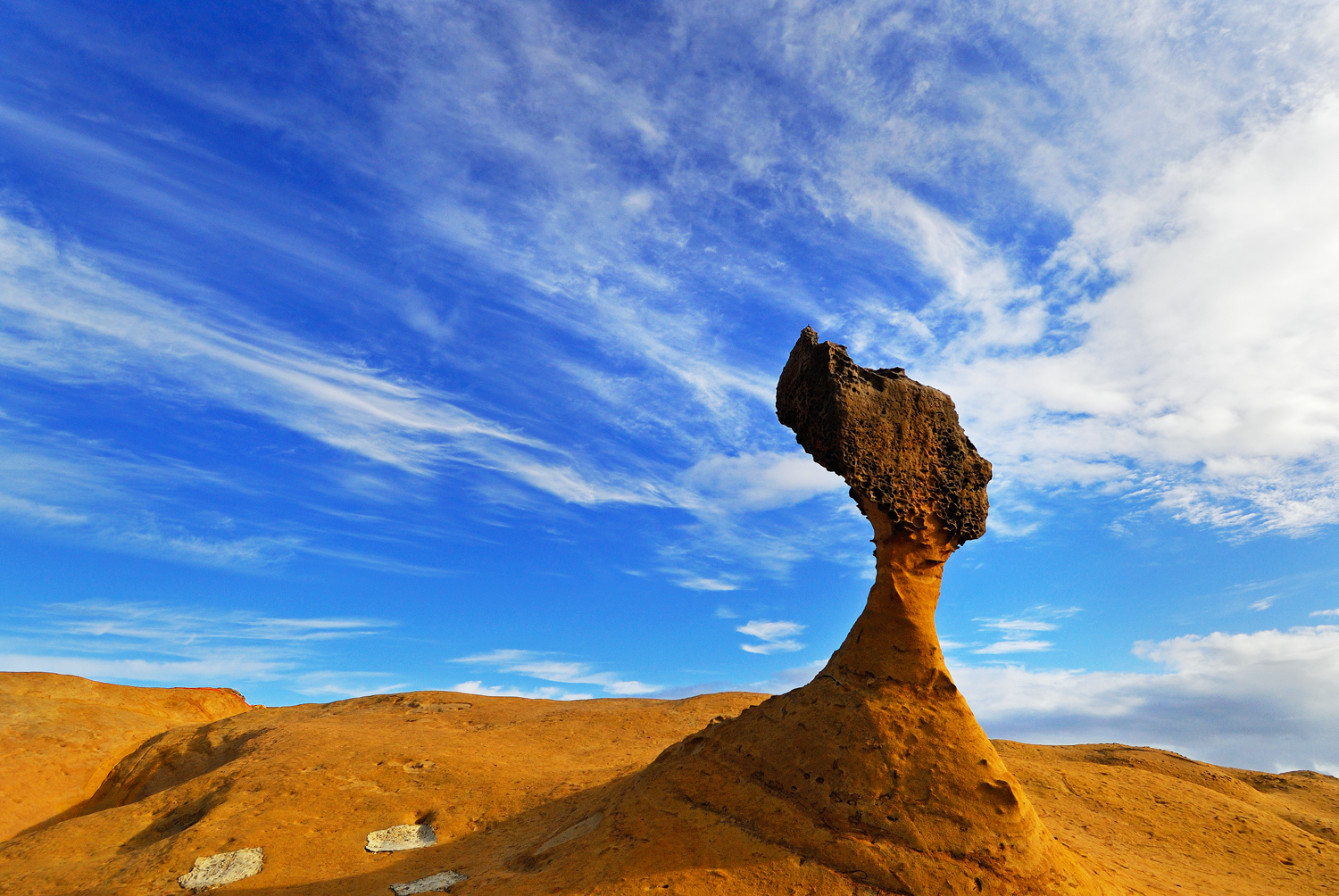
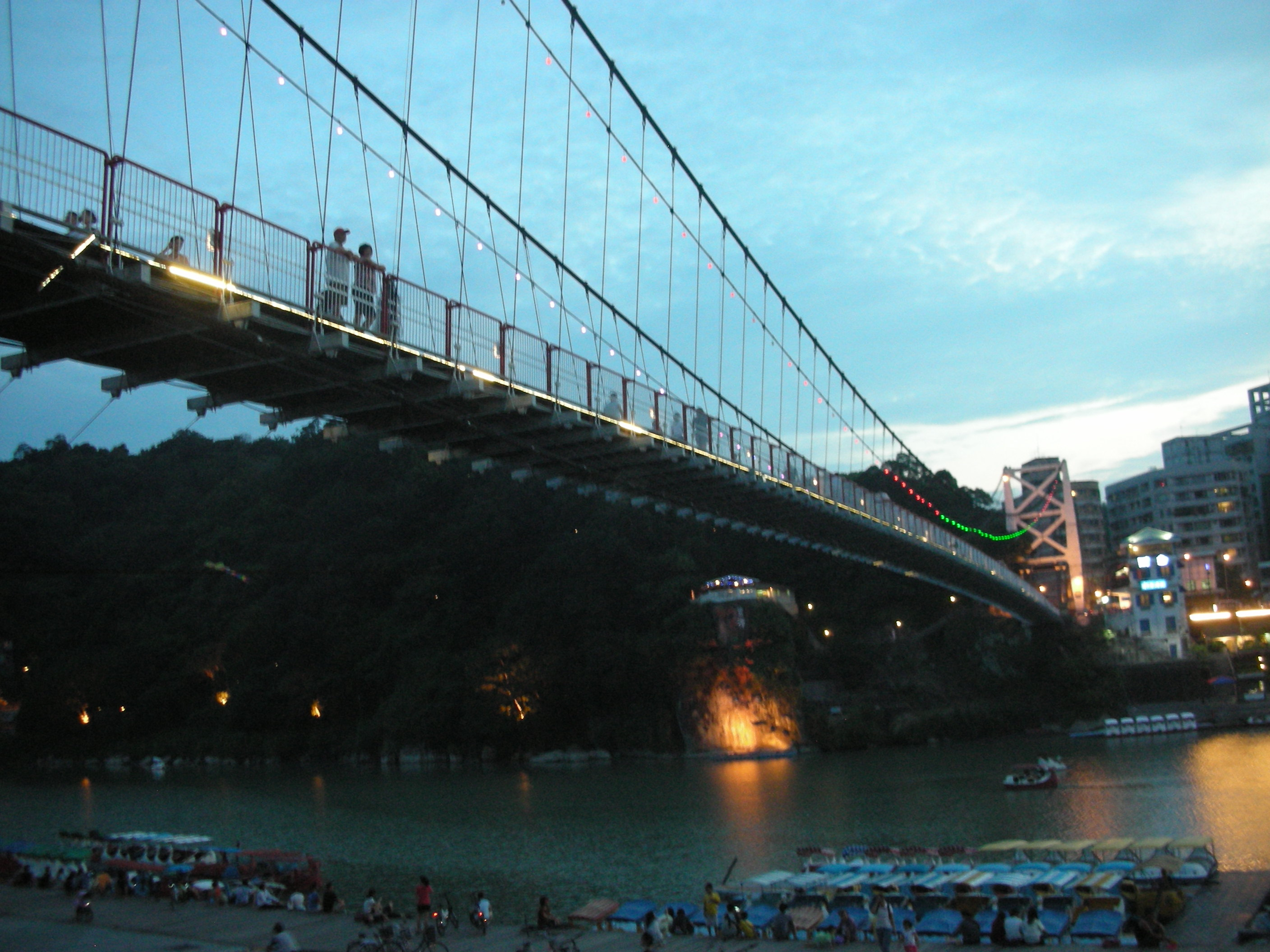
- Night scene of Xinban Special District Shifen Waterfall Jiufen Old Street at night Queen's Head Fort Santo Domingo Bitan Suspension Bridge

- Flag Logo
- Etymology: Chinese: 新北; lit. 'New north'
- Coordinates: 25°0′45″N 121°27′54″E
- Country: Republic of China (Taiwan)
- Part of Taihoku Prefecture: 17 April 1895
- Taipei County: 7 January 1946
- Special municipality status: 25 December 2010
- Seat: Banqiao District
- Districts: 29: Banqiao; Sanchong; Zhonghe; Yonghe; Xinzhuang; Xindian; Shulin; Yingge; Sanxia; Tamsui; Xizhi; Ruifang; Tucheng; Luzhou; Wugu; Taishan; Linkou; Shenkeng; Shiding; Pinglin; Sanzhi; Shimen; Bali; Pingxi; Shuangxi; Gongliao; Jinshan; Wanli; Wulai

Government
  - Body: New Taipei City Government; New Taipei City Council
  - Mayor: Hou Yu-ih (KMT)

Area
  - Special municipality: 2,052.57 km^{2} (792.50 sq mi)
  - Urban: 1,140 km^{2} (440 sq mi)
  - Rank: 9 out of 22

Population (January 2023)
  - Special municipality: 4,004,367
  - Rank: 1 out of 22
  - Density: 1,950.90/km^{2} (5,052.82/sq mi)
  - Urban: 8,535,000
  - Urban density: 7,490/km^{2} (19,400/sq mi)
- Time zone: UTC+8 (National Standard Time)
- Postal code: 207, 208, 220–224, 226–228, 231–239, 241–244, 247–249, 251–253
- Area code: (0)2
- ISO 3166 code: TW-NWT
- Website: ntpc.gov.tw

New Taipei City
- Chinese: 新北市
- Literal meaning: New North City
Transcriptions
Standard Mandarin
- Hanyu Pinyin: Xīnběi Shì
- Bopomofo: ㄒㄧㄣ ㄅㄟˇ ㄕˋ
- Gwoyeu Romatzyh: Shinbeei Shyh
- Wade–Giles: Hsin^{1}-pei^{3} Shih^{4}
- Tongyong Pinyin: Sinběi Shìh
- Yale Romanization: Syīnběi Shr̀
- MPS2: Shīnběi Shr̀
- IPA: [ɕín.pèɪ ʂɻ̩̂]
Hakka
- Pha̍k-fa-sṳ: Sîn-pet-sṳ
Southern Min
- Hokkien POJ: Sin-pak-chhī
- Tâi-lô: Sin-pak-tshī
- Bbánlám Pìngyīm: Sīnbāk Cî

New Taipei City is a special municipality located in northern Taiwan. The city is home to an estimated population of 4,004,367 as of January 2023, making it the most populous city in Taiwan, and the second largest special municipality by area, behind Kaohsiung. The top-level administrative divisions bordering New Taipei City are Keelung to the northeast, Yilan County to the southeast, and Taoyuan to the southwest, and it completely encloses the capital city of Taipei. Banqiao District is its municipal seat and biggest commercial area.

Before the establishment of Spanish and Dutch outposts in Tamsui in 1626, the area of present-day New Taipei City was mostly inhabited by Taiwanese indigenous peoples, mainly the Ketagalan people. From the late Qing era, the port of Tamsui was opened up to foreign traders as one of the treaty ports after the Qing dynasty of China signed the Treaty of Tientsin in June 1858. By the 1890s, the port of Tamsui accounted for 63 percent of the overall trade for entire Taiwan, port towns in the middle course of Tamsui River had also developed into bustling business and transportation centers. During the Japanese rule of Taiwan, the entire area of New Taipei City was organized as part of the Taihoku Prefecture.

After the Republic of China took control of Taiwan in 1945, the present-day New Taipei City was designated on 7 January 1946 as Taipei County in Taiwan Province, which was constituted from the former Taihoku Prefecture, but not including present-day divisions of Taipei City, Keelung and Yilan County, the latter of which became detached from Taipei County on 10 October 1950. Its county status remained until 25 December 2010 when it was promoted to special municipal status and renamed as "New Taipei City".

New Taipei City is a conurbation which was merged from numbers of regiopolis, suburban business districts or commuter towns to form one continuous polycentric urban area. Together with cities of Taipei and Keelung, New Taipei City constitutes a substantial part of the Taipei-Keelung metropolitan area which spans from the island's northern coastline to the mountainous Xueshan Range, and encompasses the entire Taipei Basin within its boundaries. The city is well-connected to other major cities in proximity or other parts of the island by various public transports such as Metro services, high-speed rail and an airport line commuting to Taoyuan International Airport, a major hub airport in northern Taiwan. The Port of Taipei, an artificial international seaport, is situated in the northwestern coast of the city in Bali District.

== Name ==
New Taipei City was formerly known as Taipei County before its promotion to special municipality status in 2010. The name of the new municipality (新北市, literally "New Northern City") was initially rendered in English as Xinbei City via pinyin romanization, but both candidates for the city's first mayoral election opposed the name. Consequently, citing public opinion, the inaugural mayor, Eric Chu, requested and received approval from the Ministry of the Interior (MOI) to render the name in English as New Taipei City. This rendering became official on 31 December 2010.

== History ==
=== Early history ===
Archeological records show that New Taipei City had been inhabited since the Neolithic period, with artifacts dug in Bali District having shown remains as early as 7000 to 4700 BC. The region around New Taipei City area was once inhabited by Ketagalan plains aborigines, and evidence shows that the Atayal had inhabited Wulai District. The earliest recorded migration by people from mainland China dated back as early as 1620, when the local tribes were driven into the mountain areas. Over the years, many of the aborigines have assimilated into the general population.

=== Qing dynasty ===
During the Qing Dynasty rule of Taiwan, the Han Chinese people began to settle in the area now designated as New Taipei City in 1694 and the number of immigrants from mainland China had further increased. After decades of development and prosperity, Tamsui had become an international commercial port by 1850. British consulate and stores were established in the region, which helped promote the local tea business, resulting in massive tea leaf exports to Europe. In 1875, Shen Baozhen called for the establishment of Taipeh Prefecture. Fujian-Taiwan-Province was declared in 1887 and the present-day New Taipei City area fell under the jurisdiction of Taipeh Prefecture.

=== Japanese rule ===
In 1895, Taiwan was ceded by the Qing dynasty to the Empire of Japan. During Japanese rule, the New Taipei City area was administered under Taihoku Prefecture together with modern-day Taipei, Keelung and Yilan County. Gold and other mineral deposits were discovered at Keelung Mountain, triggering a mining boom in the region. In October 1896, Japanese government divided the mining area around Keelung Mountain into two districts: an eastern district, designated as Kinkaseki, and a western district, designated as Kyūfun. Both districts are now parts of Ruifang District. They also issued regulations barring local Taiwanese mining companies from mining in the area, giving the mining rights to Japanese companies instead.

=== Republic of China ===
After the handover of Taiwan from Japan to the Republic of China in October 1945, from 25 December of the same year, the present New Taipei City area was administered as Taipei County with Banqiao City as the county seat. In July 1949, the size of Taipei County was reduced when Beitou and Shilin townships were put under the jurisdiction of the newly created Caoshan Administrative Bureau, which would later be renamed the Yangmingshan Administrative Bureau. The southeastern part of Taipei County, became Yilan County on 10 October 1950, while Taipei City was detached from Taipei County from a provincial city to a special municipality on 1 July 1967. On 1 July 1968, the size of Taipei County was further reduced by 205.16 km^{2} (79.21 mi^{2}) when Jingmei, Muzha, Nangang and Neihu townships, along with Beitou and Shilin, were merged into Taipei City.

The county afterward had ten county-administered cities (Banqiao, Luzhou, Sanchong, Shulin, Tucheng, Xizhi, Xindian, Yonghe, Zhonghe); four urban townships (Ruifang, Sanxia, Tamsui, Yingge); and fifteen rural townships (Bali, Gongliao, Jinshan, Linkou, Pinglin, Pingxi, Sanzhi, Shenkeng, Shiding, Shimen, Shuangxi, Taishan, Wanli, Wugu, Wulai). It was further divided into 1,017 villages and 21,683 neighborhoods. In August 1992, due to the adjustment of the demarcation line between Taipei City and Taipei County around Neigou and Daking Creeks, the area of Taipei County was decreased by 0.03 km^{2} (0.012 sq mi). On 25 December 2010, Taipei County was upgraded to a special municipality as New Taipei City consisting of 29 districts with the modern Banqiao District as the municipal seat.

== Geography ==
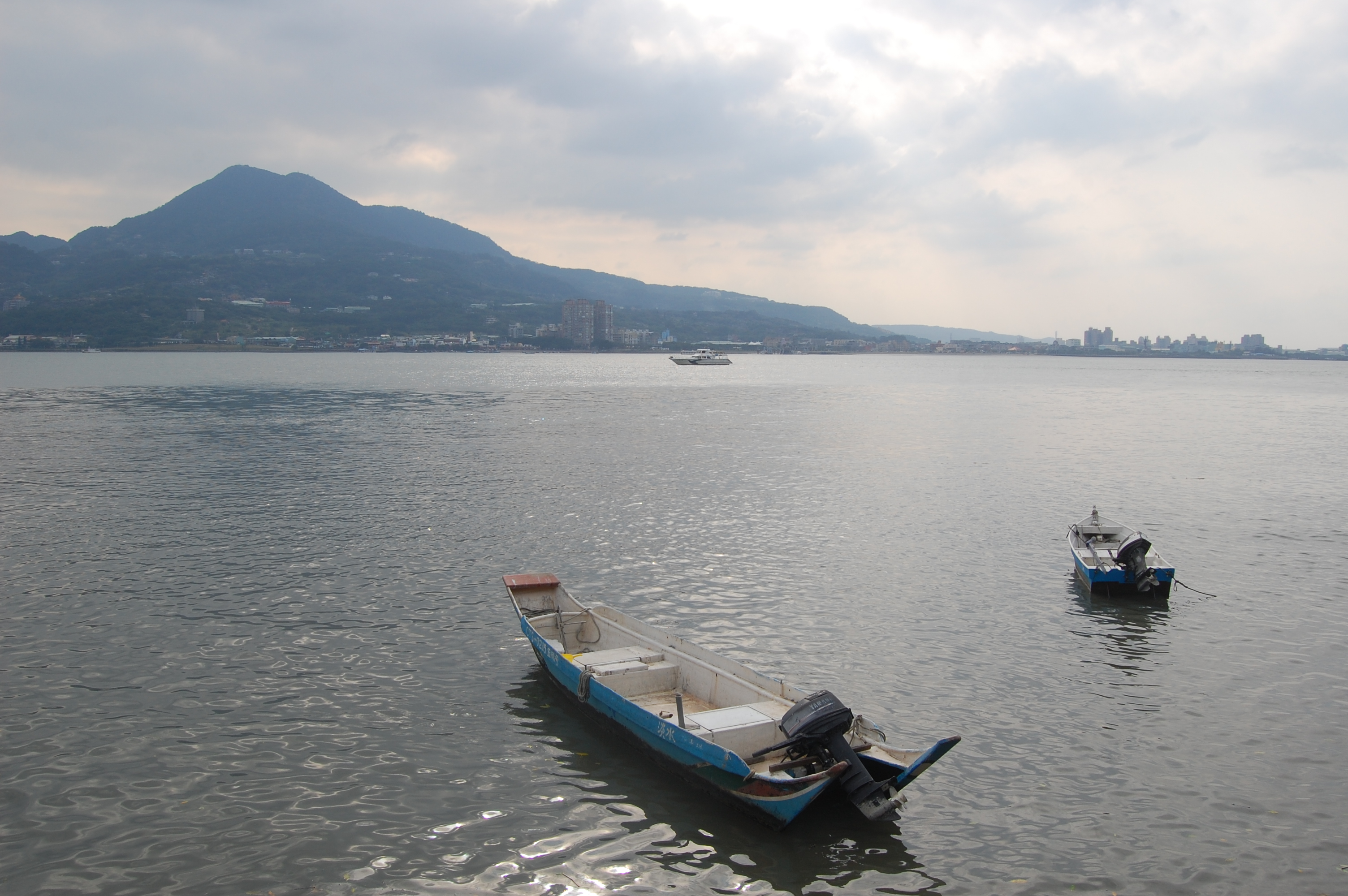
Tamsui River

New Taipei City is located at the northern tip of Taiwan Island. It covers a vast territory with a varied topology, including mountains, hills, plains and basins. In the northern part lies 120 km (75 mi) of coastline with gorgeous shorelines and beaches. The Tamsui River is the main river flowing through New Taipei City. Other large tributaries are the Xindian, Keelung and Dahan rivers, sections of which constitute riverside parks. The tallest peak in the city is Mount Zhuzi, standing at 1,094 m and located in the Sanzhi District.

=== Climate ===
The climate of the city is characterized as a humid subtropical climate with seasonal monsoons and ample rainfall evenly distributed throughout the year. Seasonal variations of temperatures are noticeable although temperatures typically varies from warm to hot throughout the year, except when cold fronts strikes during the winter months when temperatures can sometimes dip below 10 °C (50 °F). January is typically the coolest month and July is usually the warmest.New Taipei City was affected by the June 2017 Taiwan rainstorm.

Climate data for Tamsui District, New Taipei City (1991–2020 normals, extremes 1942–present)
Month	Jan	Feb	Mar	Apr	May	Jun	Jul	Aug	Sep	Oct	Nov	Dec	Year
Record high °C (°F)	28.4 (83.1)	29.0 (84.2)	31.9 (89.4)	33.6 (92.5)	35.8 (96.4)	37.3 (99.1)	38.8 (101.8)	38.5 (101.3)	37.4 (99.3)	35.8 (96.4)	32.8 (91.0)	30.5 (86.9)	38.8 (101.8)
Mean daily maximum °C (°F)	18.8 (65.8)	19.3 (66.7)	21.6 (70.9)	25.4 (77.7)	28.8 (83.8)	31.3 (88.3)	33.3 (91.9)	33.1 (91.6)	30.9 (87.6)	27.1 (80.8)	24.4 (75.9)	20.6 (69.1)	26.2 (79.2)
Daily mean °C (°F)	15.4 (59.7)	15.7 (60.3)	17.7 (63.9)	21.4 (70.5)	24.7 (76.5)	27.3 (81.1)	29.0 (84.2)	28.7 (83.7)	26.9 (80.4)	24.6 (76.3)	21.0 (69.8)	17.3 (63.1)	22.5 (72.5)
Mean daily minimum °C (°F)	12.7 (54.9)	13.0 (55.4)	14.7 (58.5)	18.3 (64.9)	21.6 (70.9)	24.2 (75.6)	25.7 (78.3)	25.5 (77.9)	23.8 (74.8)	20.9 (69.6)	18.3 (64.9)	14.6 (58.3)	19.4 (67.0)
Record low °C (°F)	2.3 (36.1)	3.2 (37.8)	3.1 (37.6)	6.7 (44.1)	13.4 (56.1)	15.4 (59.7)	20.4 (68.7)	19.6 (67.3)	15.5 (59.9)	10.6 (51.1)	7.6 (45.7)	4.2 (39.6)	2.3 (36.1)
Average precipitation mm (inches)	105.9 (4.17)	178.0 (7.01)	153.4 (6.04)	157.6 (6.20)	239.8 (9.44)	257.4 (10.13)	119.8 (4.72)	218.3 (8.59)	290.1 (11.42)	165.8 (6.53)	104.2 (4.10)	112.4 (4.43)	2,102.7 (82.78)
Average rainy days (≥ 0.1 mm)	13.9	13.8	15.2	13.6	12.6	12.2	8.3	10.9	11.8	12.3	12.4	12.5	149.5
Average relative humidity (%)	80.8	82.4	81.9	79.9	79.2	79.9	75.9	76.0	76.1	77.8	78.5	79.0	79.0
Mean monthly sunshine hours	83.1	70.4	92.7	105.9	135.6	155.9	226.9	208.6	171.7	127.5	101.9	84.1	1,564.3
Source: Central Weather Bureau

== Cityscape ==
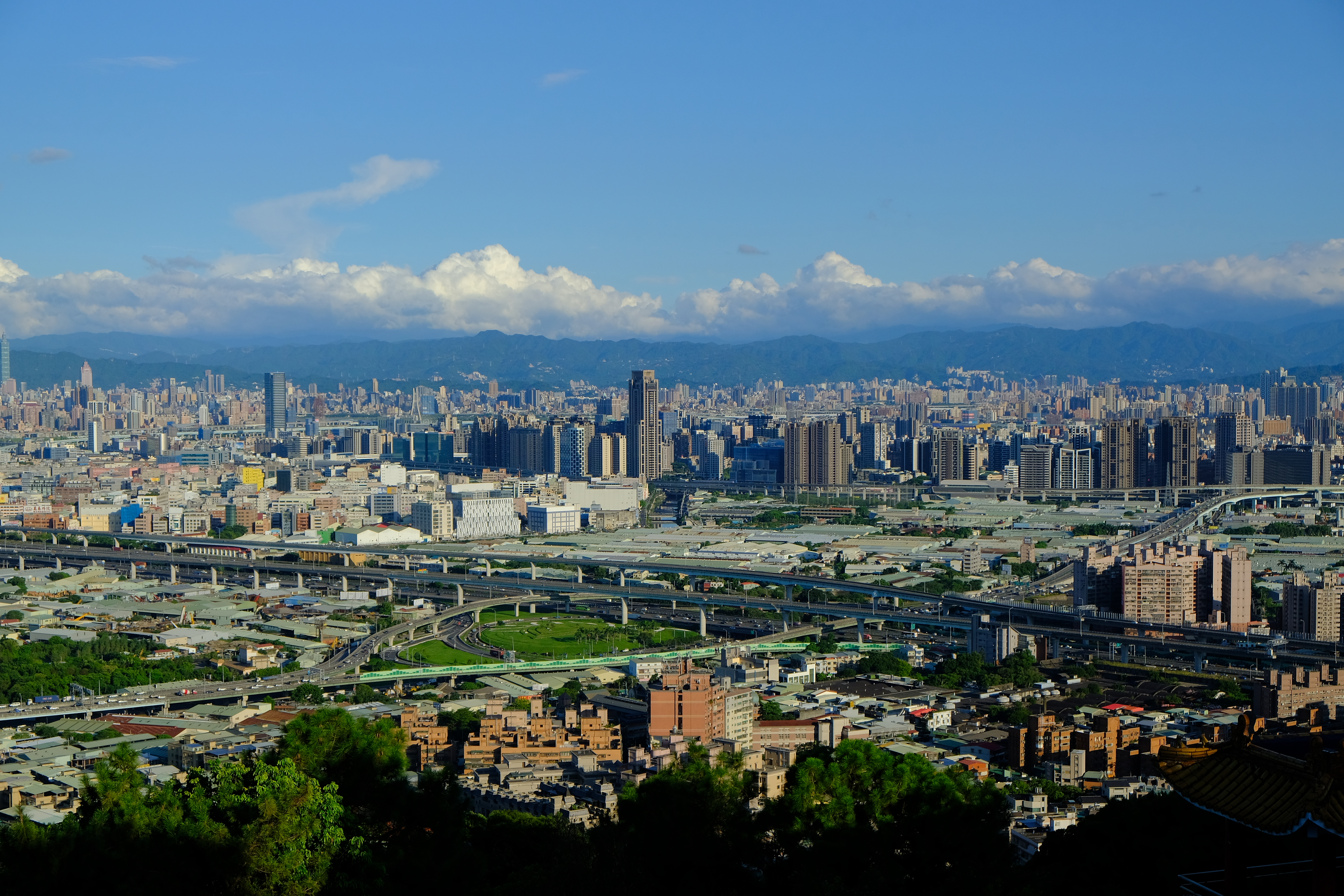
View of Sanchong, Xinzhuang and Wugu
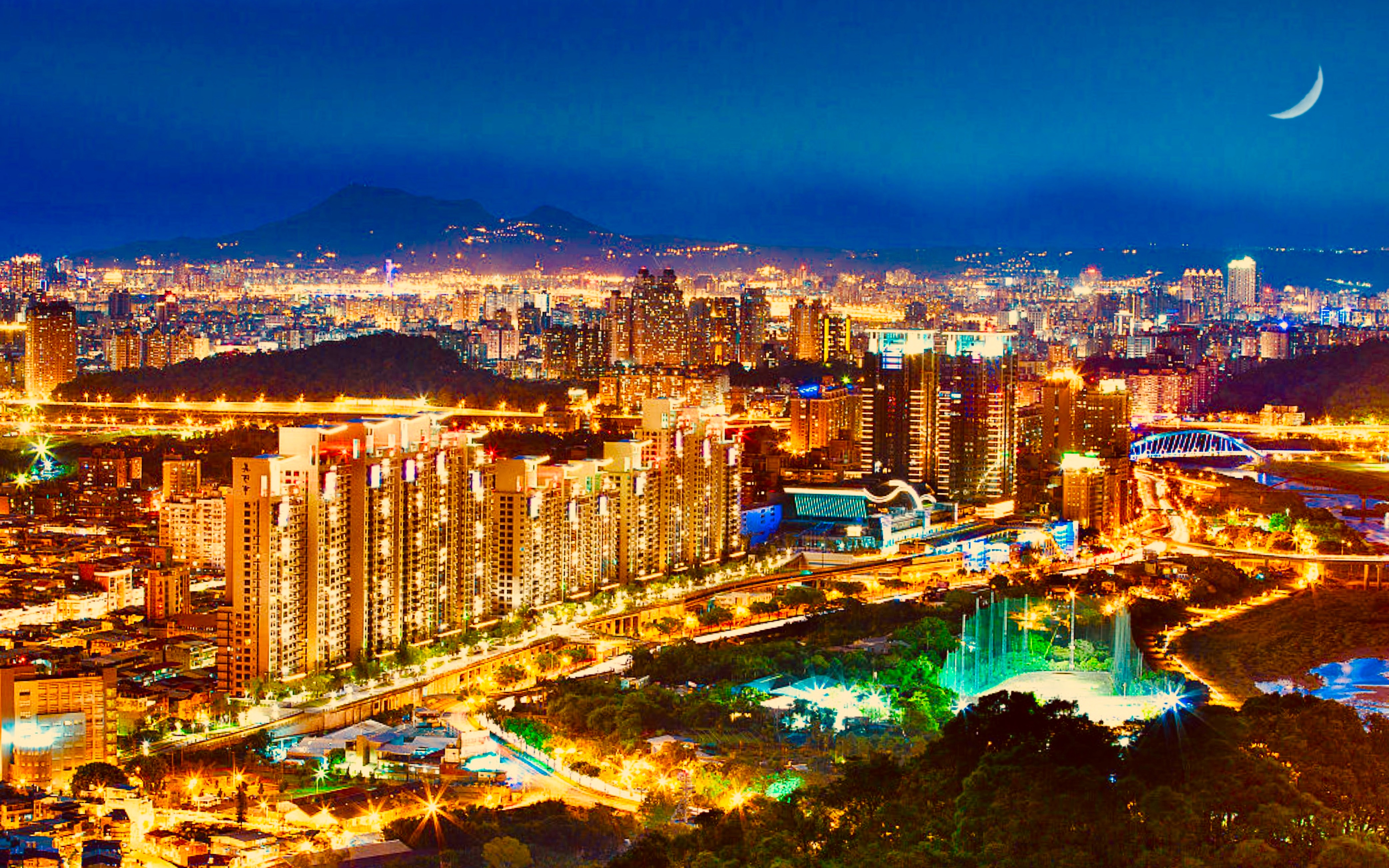
View of New Taipei City at night. Xiaobitan metro station is the building with curved roof-line, right of center.

== Government ==
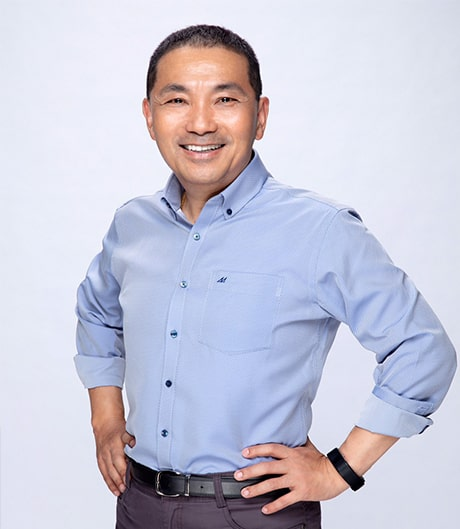
Hou Yu-ih, incumbent mayor of New Taipei City

(2018–)

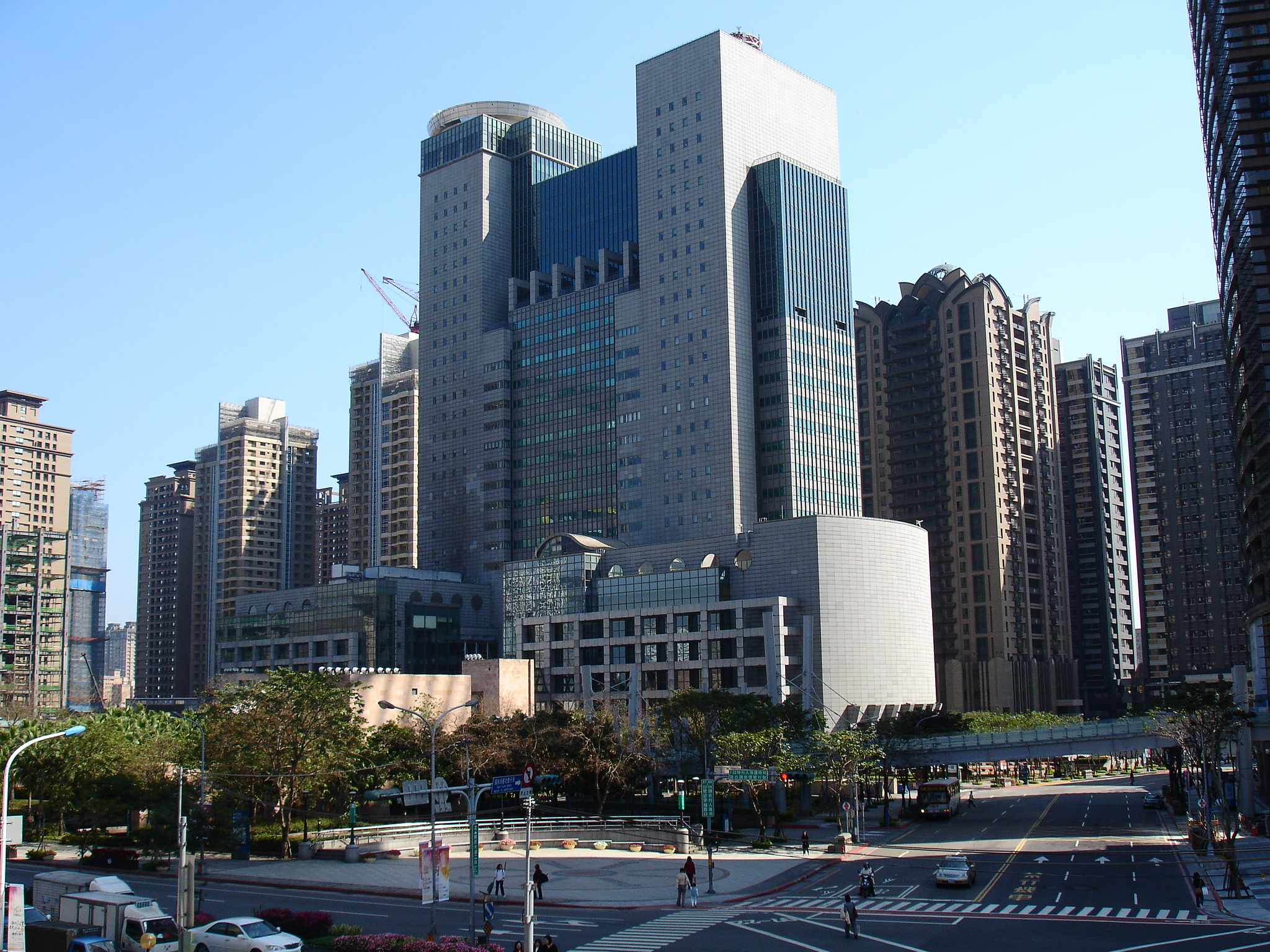
New Taipei City Government

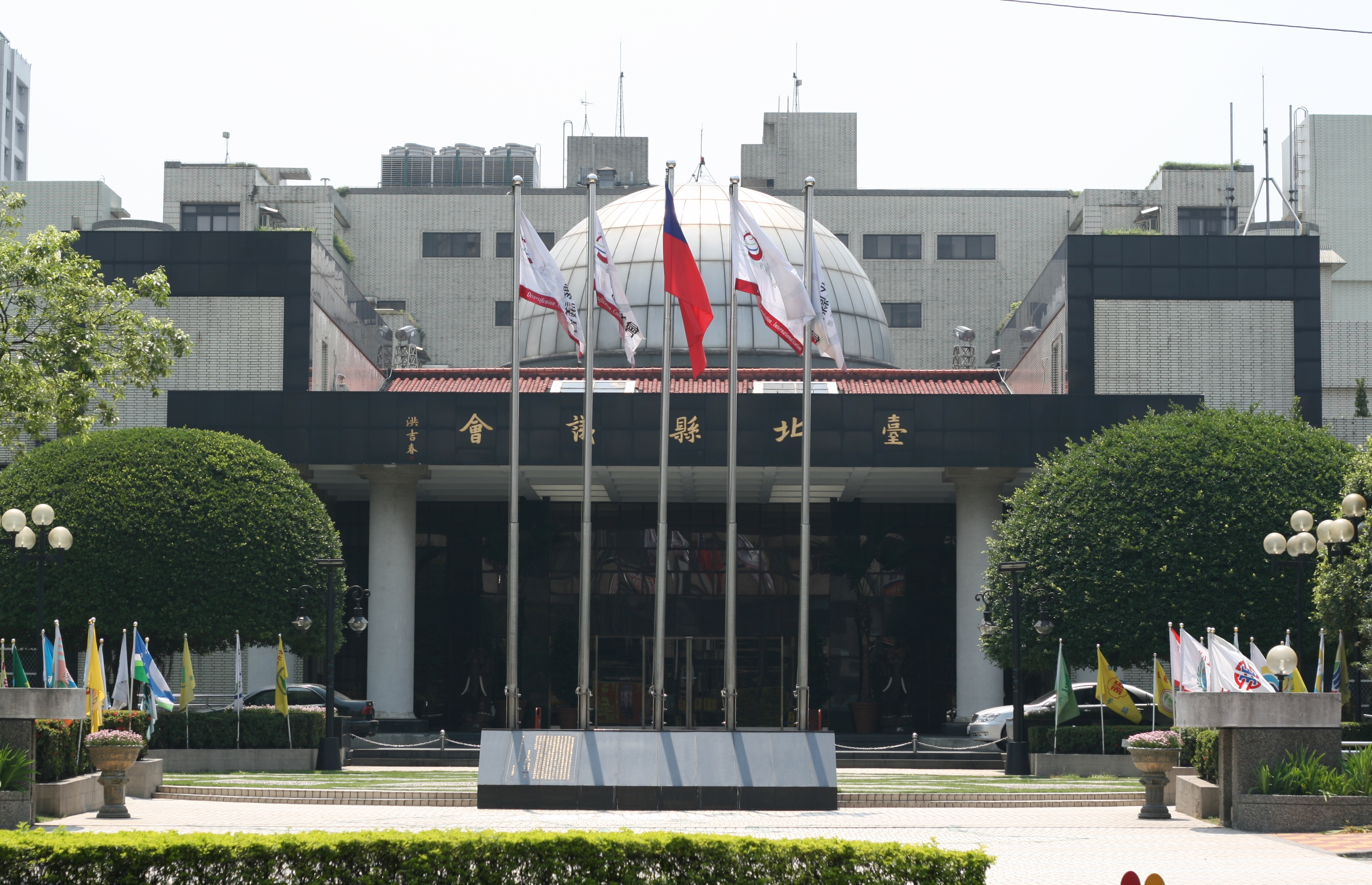
New Taipei City Council

New Taipei City is a special municipality directly under the central government of the Republic of China. The New Taipei City Government is headed by an elected mayor and is headquartered at the New Taipei City Hall at Banqiao District. The current mayor of New Taipei City is Hou Yu-ih of the Kuomintang.

=== Municipal administration ===
New Taipei City administers 28 districts (區; qū) and 1 mountain indigenous district (山地原住民區; shāndì yuánzhùmín qū). The sub-city entities consists of 1,017 villages (里; lǐ), which in turn are divided into 21,683 neighborhoods (鄰; lín). The municipal seat is located at Banqiao District.

Map of New Taipei
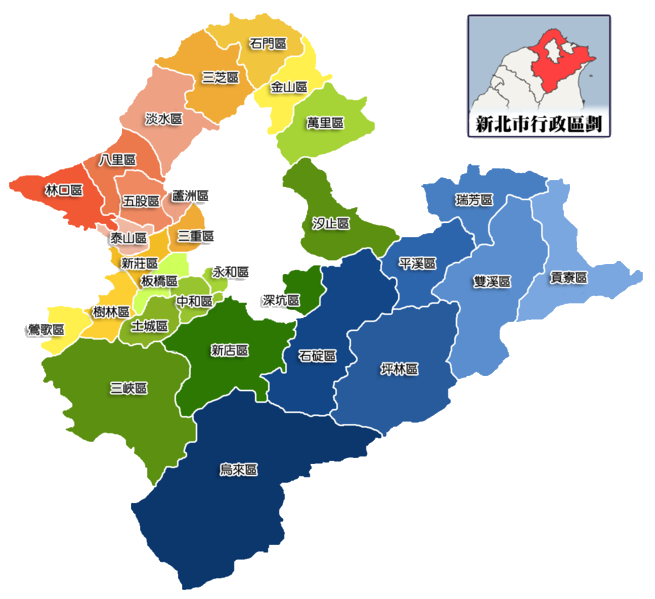

Region	Name	Chinese	Taiwanese	Hakka	Formosan	Population	Area (km^{2})
Tamsui; River; South	Banqiao	板橋區	Pang-kiô	Piông-khièu		554,008	23.1373
Tamsui; River; South	Zhonghe	中和區	Tiong-hô	Chûng-fò		414,356	20.1440
Tamsui; River; South	Yonghe	永和區	Éng-hô	Yún-fò		225,353	5.7138
Tamsui; River; South	Tucheng	土城區	Thô͘-siâⁿ	Thú-sàng		238,646	29.5578
Tamsui; River; South	Shulin	樹林區	Chhiū-nâ	Su-nà		184,329	33.1288
Tamsui; River; South	Sanxia	三峽區	Sam-kiap	Sâm-hia̍p		112,775	191.4508
Tamsui; River; South	Yingge	鶯歌區	Eng-ko	Yîn-kô		87,931	21.1248
Tamsui; River; North	Xinzhuang	新莊區	Sin-chng	Sîn-chông		413,443	19.7383
Tamsui; River; North	Sanchong	三重區	Sam-tiông/Saⁿ-tēng-po͘	Sâm-chhùng		388,386	16.3170
Tamsui; River; North	Luzhou	蘆洲區	Lô͘-chiu	Lù-chû		200,055	8.321
Tamsui; River; North	Wugu	五股區	Gō͘-kó͘	Ńg-kú		82,983	34.8632
Tamsui; River; North	Taishan	泰山區	Thài-san	Thai-sân		78,801	19.1603
Tamsui; River; North	Linkou	林口區	Nâ-khàu	Nà-khiéu		100,554	54.1519
North; Western; Coast	Tamsui	淡水區	Tām-chuí	Thâm-súi		162,441	70.6565
North; Western; Coast	Bali	八里區	Pat-lí	Pat-lî		37,711	39.4933
North; Western; Coast	Sanzhi	三芝區	Sam-chi	Sâm-chṳ		23,452	65.9909
North; Western; Coast	Shimen	石門區	Chio̍h-mn̂g	Sa̍k-mùn		12,645	51.2645
North; Eastern; Coast	Jinshan	金山區	Kim-san	Kîm-sân		22,273	49.2132
North; Eastern; Coast	Wanli	萬里區	Bān-lí	Van-lî		22,634	63.3766
North; Eastern; Coast	Xizhi	汐止區	Se̍k-chí	Sip-chṳ		196,150	71.2354
North; Eastern; Coast	Ruifang	瑞芳區	Sūi-hong	Lui-fông		40,922	70.7336
North; Eastern; Coast	Gongliao	貢寮區	Kòng-liâu	Kung-liàu		12,858	99.9734
North; Eastern; Coast	Pingxi	平溪區	Pêng-khe	Phìn-hâi		4,872	71.3382
North; Eastern; Coast	Shuangxi	雙溪區	Siang-khe	Sûng-hâi		9,233	146.2484
Southern	Xindian	新店區	Sin-tiàm	Sîn-tiam		300,283	120.2255
Southern	Shenkeng	深坑區	Chhim-kheⁿ	Chhṳ̂m-hâng		23,614	20.5787
Southern	Shiding	石碇區	Chio̍h-tēng	Sa̍k-tàng		7,857	144.3498
Southern	Pinglin	坪林區	Pêⁿ-nâ	Phiâng-lìm		6,503	170.8350
Mountain indigenous district	Wulai	烏來區	U-lai	Vû-lòi	Ulay^{Atayal}	6,182	321.1306

Colors indicates the common languages status of Formosan languages within each division.

=== Central government ===
Many agencies of the central government are located in New Taipei City due to its proximity to the capital Taipei City. The Council of Indigenous Peoples, Hakka Affairs Council and Ministry of Culture are headquartered in Xinzhuang District at the Xinzhuang Joint Office Tower. The Architecture and Building Research Institute, Taiwan Transportation Safety Board and National Airborne Service Corps, National Fire Agency of the Ministry of the Interior and the National Science and Technology Center for Disaster Reduction of the Ministry of Science and Technology are located in Xindian District. Financial Supervisory Commission is located at Banqiao District. The Atomic Energy Council is located at Yonghe District. The National Academy for Educational Research of the Ministry of Education is located at Sanxia District.

== Demographics ==
A map of New Taipei City's population density

Historical population
Year	Pop.	±%
1950	503,058	—
1955	638,091	+26.8%
1960	829,012	+29.9%
1965	1,061,552	+28.1%
1970	1,240,576	+16.9%
1975	1,629,105	+31.3%
1980	2,258,757	+38.7%
1985	2,663,683	+17.9%
1990	3,048,034	+14.4%
1995	3,305,615	+8.5%
2000	3,567,896	+7.9%
2005	3,767,095	+5.6%
2010	3,897,367	+3.5%
2015	3,970,644	+1.9%
2020	4,030,954	+1.5%
2025	4,044,831	+0.3%
source: 1. 縣市人口按性別及五齡組(63). 內政部戶政司.; 2. 臺北縣現住人口 (1950-1960). 臺北縣統計要覽 (Report) (in Chinese (Taiwan)). Vol. 中華民國49年度(50. 7). 臺北縣政府主計室. July 1961. pp. 20–33 – via 政府統計資訊網 (國家圖書館).; 3. 臺北縣現住人口 (1961-1968). 臺北縣統計要覽 (Report) (in Chinese (Taiwan)). Vol. 中華民國57年度(58. 7). 臺北縣政府主計室. July 1969. pp. 14–27 – via 政府統計資訊網 (國家圖書館).; 4. 臺北縣現住人口按籍貫分 (1968-1980). 臺北縣統計要覽 (Report) (in Chinese (Taiwan)). Vol. 中華民國69年度(70. 7). 臺北縣政府主計室. July 1981. pp. 20–21 – via 政府統計資訊網 (國家圖書館).

New Taipei City has an estimated population of 4 million. Over 80% of New Taipei City's residents live in the 10 districts that were formerly county-administered cities (Banqiao, Luzhou, Sanchong, Shulin, Tucheng, Xizhi, Xindian, Xinzhuang, Yonghe and Zhonghe), which account for one-sixth of the area. 28.80% of the residents moved into the area from Taipei City. Around 70% of the population living in New Taipei City come from different parts of Taiwan, and there are around 73,000 foreigners residing in the city, making New Taipei City the third largest municipality in Taiwan in terms of foreign resident population.

View source data.

== Religion ==
The city is home to 952 registered temples and 120 churches, including 160 Buddhist-Taoist temples and more than 3,000 Taoist shrines. The city also houses five major Buddhist monasteries, such as the Dharma Drum Mountain in Jinshan District and Ling-jiou Mountain Monastery in Gongliao District. On average, there are two worship places in every square kilometer around the city. Xizhi District and Sanxia District have the highest number of registered temples, while Wulai District has the fewest. New Taipei City houses the Museum of World Religions in Yonghe District.

== Sports ==
Taiwan's Chinese Professional Baseball League has a professional baseball team, Fubon Guardians, based in New Taipei City.

New Taipei City also has two professional basketball teams, the New Taipei CTBC DEA of the T1 League and the New Taipei Kings of the P. League+.

Below is a list of recent sporting events held by the city:

- 2010 BWF Super Series Finals
- 2013 World Baseball Classic – Qualifier 4
- 2016 International Children's Games: the first major international sports event held by New Taipei City.
- 2017 Asian Baseball Championship (Co-hosted with Taipei)
- 2018 AFC Futsal Championship (Co-hosted with Taipei)
- 2025 Summer World Masters Games: New Taipei City co-hosted the international multi-sport event with Taipei.

Recurring major sporting events held by the city:

- New Taipei City Wan Jin Shi Marathon: the first and only IAAF Silver Label marathon race in Taiwan.
- Mercuries Taiwan Masters
- William Jones Cup

New Taipei City is home to the Banqiao Stadium and Xinzhuang Baseball Stadium.

== Economy ==
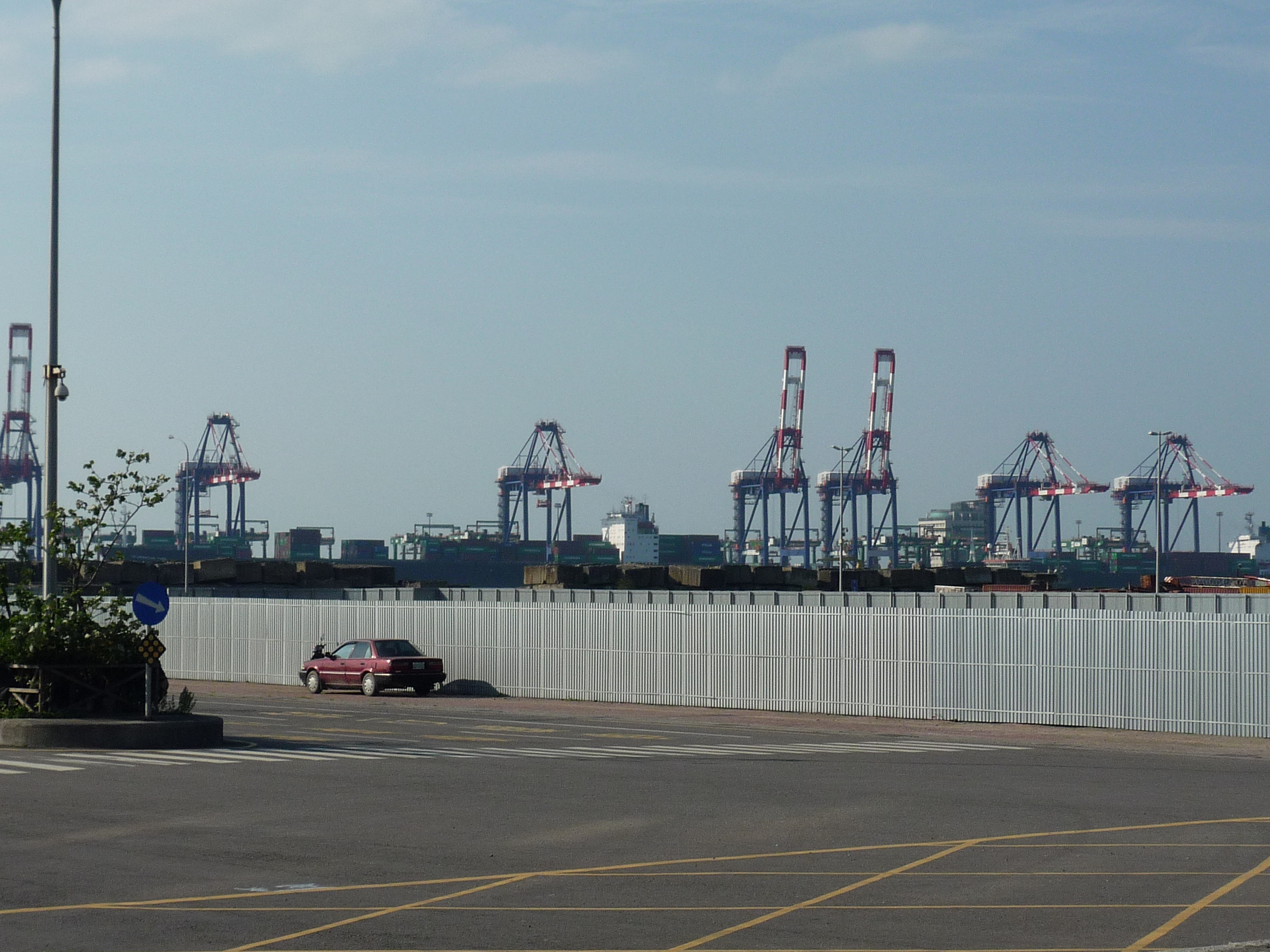
Port of Taipei

Due to its strategic location, New Taipei City is the second major city of business industries after Taipei, with over 250,000 privately owned companies (including Acer Computers Inc.) and 20,000 factories scattered around five industrial parks with a total capital of NT$1.8 trillion. There are also many high technology industry, service industry and tourism industry, contributing a significant amount of GDP to Taiwan. The five major industries in the city are information technology (IT), telecommunications, digital contents, biotechnology and precision instruments. The city is among the top three cities in the global market in terms of IT product production volume, securing more than 50% of the global market share for products such as motherboards, notebooks, LCD monitors and CRT monitors.

=== Creative industries ===
New Taipei City is also filled with many cultural and creative industries, such as pottery in Yingge District, Liuli industry in Tamsui District, drum industry in Xinzhuang District, dye industry in Sanxia District, noble metal processing industry in Ruifang District, sky lantern industry in Pingxi District, etc. The Taiwan Film Culture Center is planned to be built in Xinzhuang District for the key resource of the development of film industries in Taiwan. The Knowledge Industry Park is also planned to be built in the same district to encourage the clustering and expansion of digital content companies and will help turn the city into a virtual digital entertainment park.

=== Logistic industries ===
The Port of Taipei located in Bali District has the capability of fitting container ships weighing up to 80,000 tons and transporting more than 2 million TEUs annually. The Tamsui Fisherman's Wharf in Tamsui District serves as the main port for fishing boats, as well as for sightseeing and leisure.

=== Manufacturing industries ===
Foxconn is based in New Taipei City. The company is the international major company for electronic OEM/ODM products. Foxconn produces iPhones for Apple.

New Taipei is also the hometown of Giant Bicycles. In the 1980s Fairly Cycle was founded in New Taipei. The company produces 450 to 550 bikes a day for brands like Felt, Canyon (Germany), Kona, Willier and others as an OEM.

== Education ==
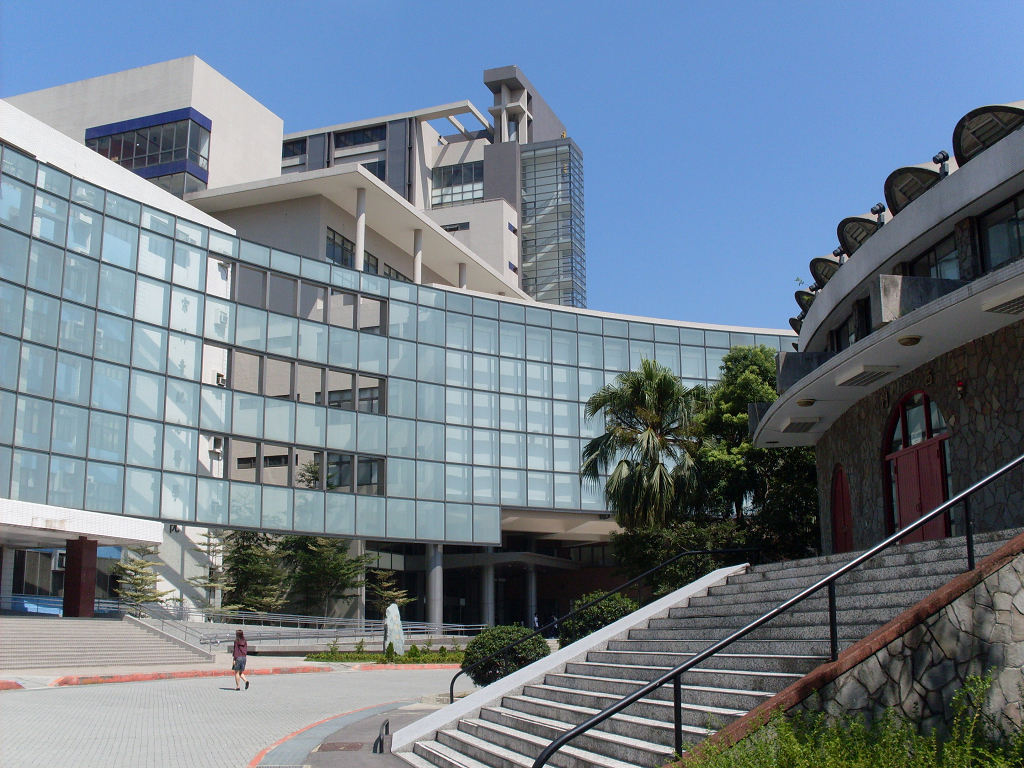
Fu Jen Catholic University

Education in New Taipei City is governed by the Education Department of New Taipei City Government. The city population is highly educated, with over 38% of the people having received higher education.

=== Universities and colleges ===
There are currently 24 colleges and universities in New Taipei City. Fu Jen Catholic University is the representative university of New Taipei City by QS Most Affordable Cities for Students Ranking. Mayor of New Taipei City Hou Yu-ih once pointed out in 2021 that "Fu Jen is the core of talent, academics and medical care in New Taipei City".

Some of the other universities and colleges in the city are Aletheia University, Asia Eastern University of Science and Technology, Cardinal Tien College of Healthcare and Management, Huafan University, HungKuo Delin University of Technology, Hwa Hsia University of Technology, Hsing Wu University, Lee-Ming Institute of Technology, Mackay Medical College, Ming Chi University of Technology, St. John's University, Taipei University of Marine Technology etc.

=== Public libraries ===
Founded in 1914, the National Taiwan Library, the oldest public library in Taiwan, is located in the city at Zhonghe District.

=== Education centers ===
Opened in January 2008, the Sustainable Development Education Center in Bali District is a center for wetland conservation education.

== Energy ==
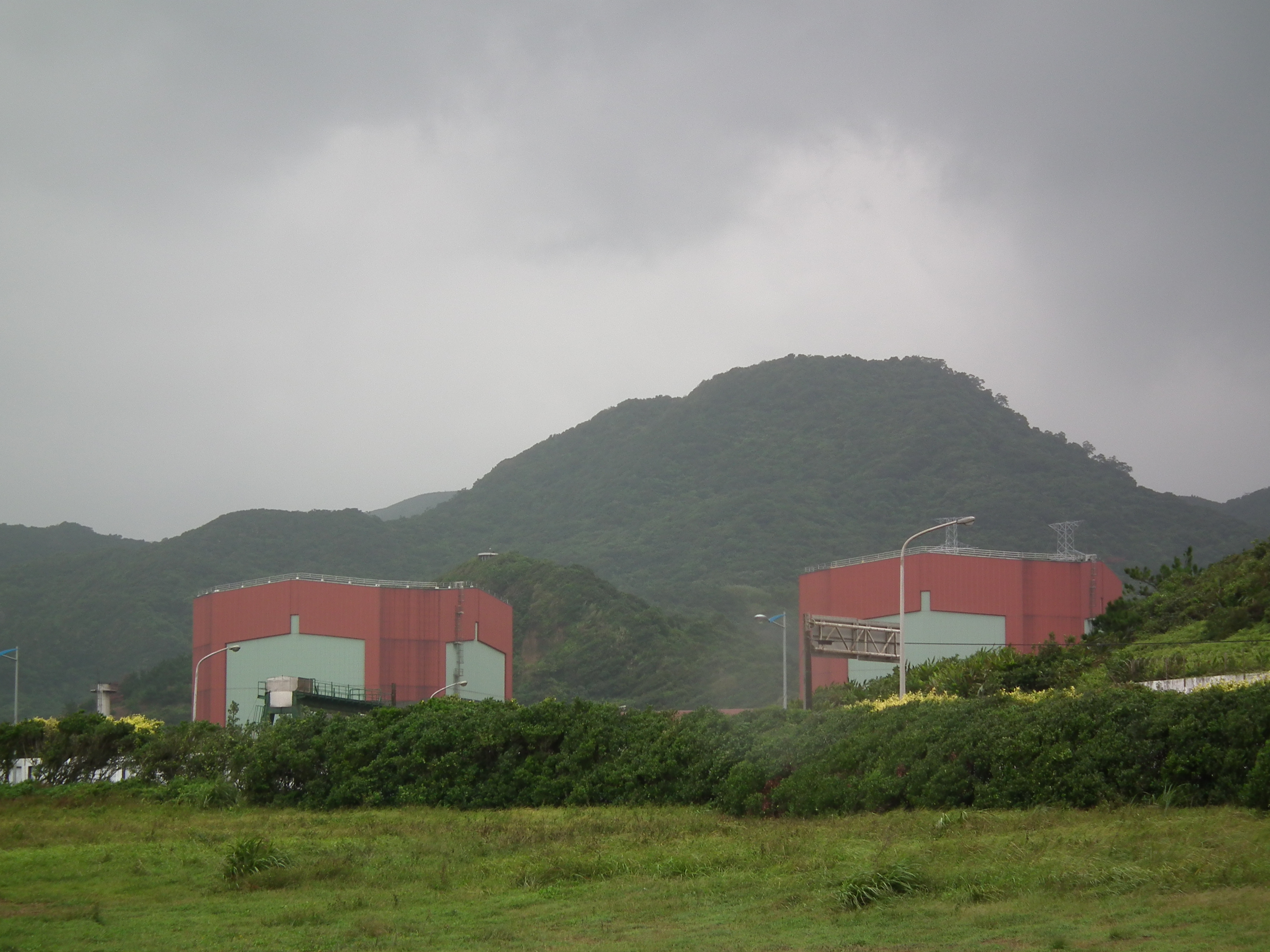
Kuosheng Nuclear Power Plant

=== Power generation ===
New Taipei City housed one of Taiwan's nuclear power plants, the Kuosheng Nuclear Power Plant in Wanli District. The planned fourth nuclear power plant, Lungmen Nuclear Power Plant, located at Gongliao District has currently been halted due to public opposition. Other power generators in the city are the Linkou Coal-Fired Power Plant in Linkou District and Feitsui Hydroelectric Power Plant in Shiding District.

=== Green energy and energy saving ===
New Taipei City is developing to be a Green Future City. The city provides a Carbon Reduction Clinic for houses and businesses with general consultation and on-site inspections for greener equipment, in which it is helped by the low-carbon community subsidies. The city also implements the Assist Industries with Cleaner Production Plan to help businesses adapt to the efforts toward becoming green industries. The city government also actively promoting green energy industries and smart electric vehicles.

In January 2016, New Taipei City was the top in terms of electricity saving in Taiwan, in which electricity consumption for the period April–November 2015 was cut down by 1.24%.

== Main sights ==
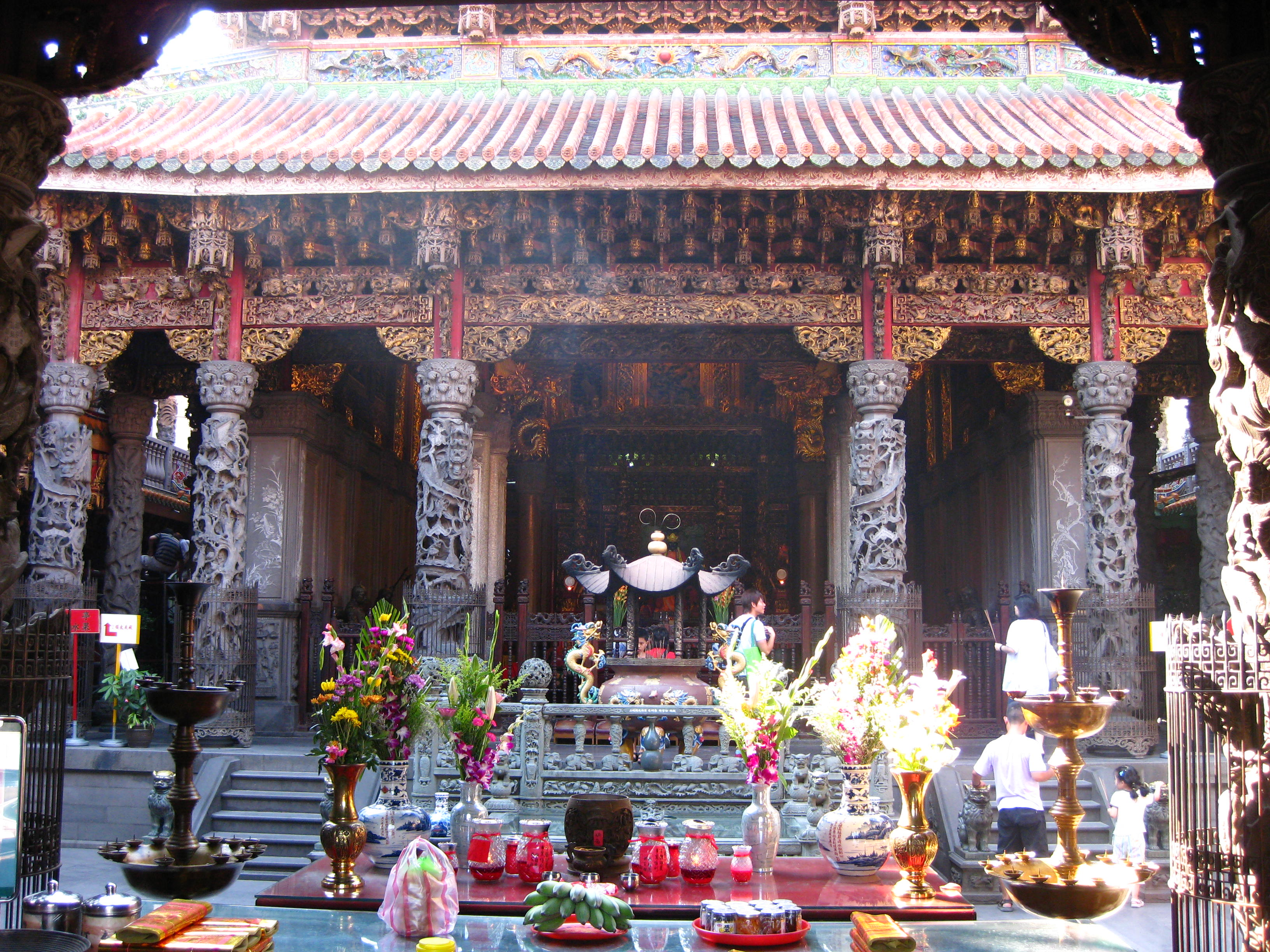
Zushi Temple in Sanxia District

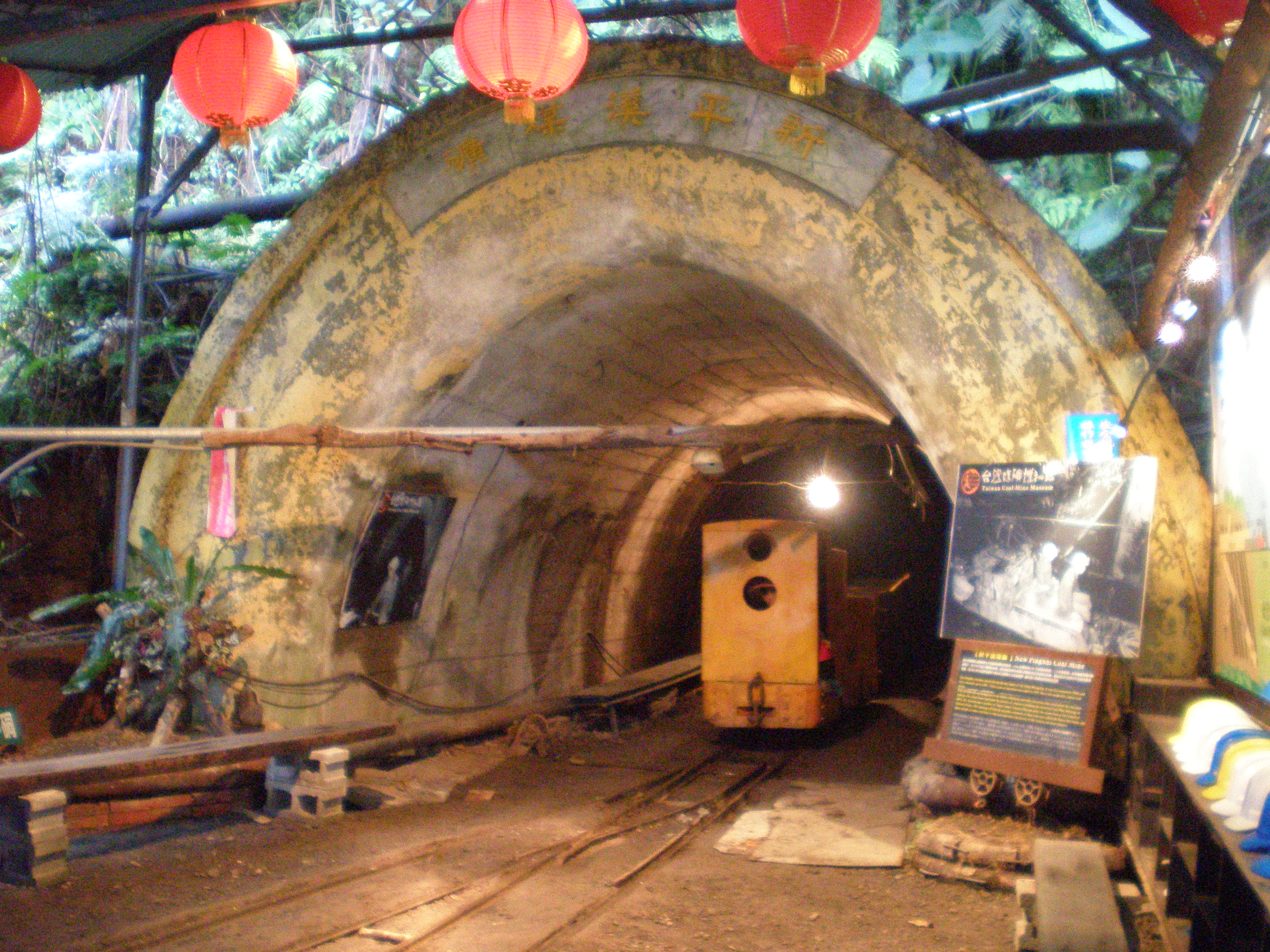
Taiwan Coal Mine Museum in Pingxi District

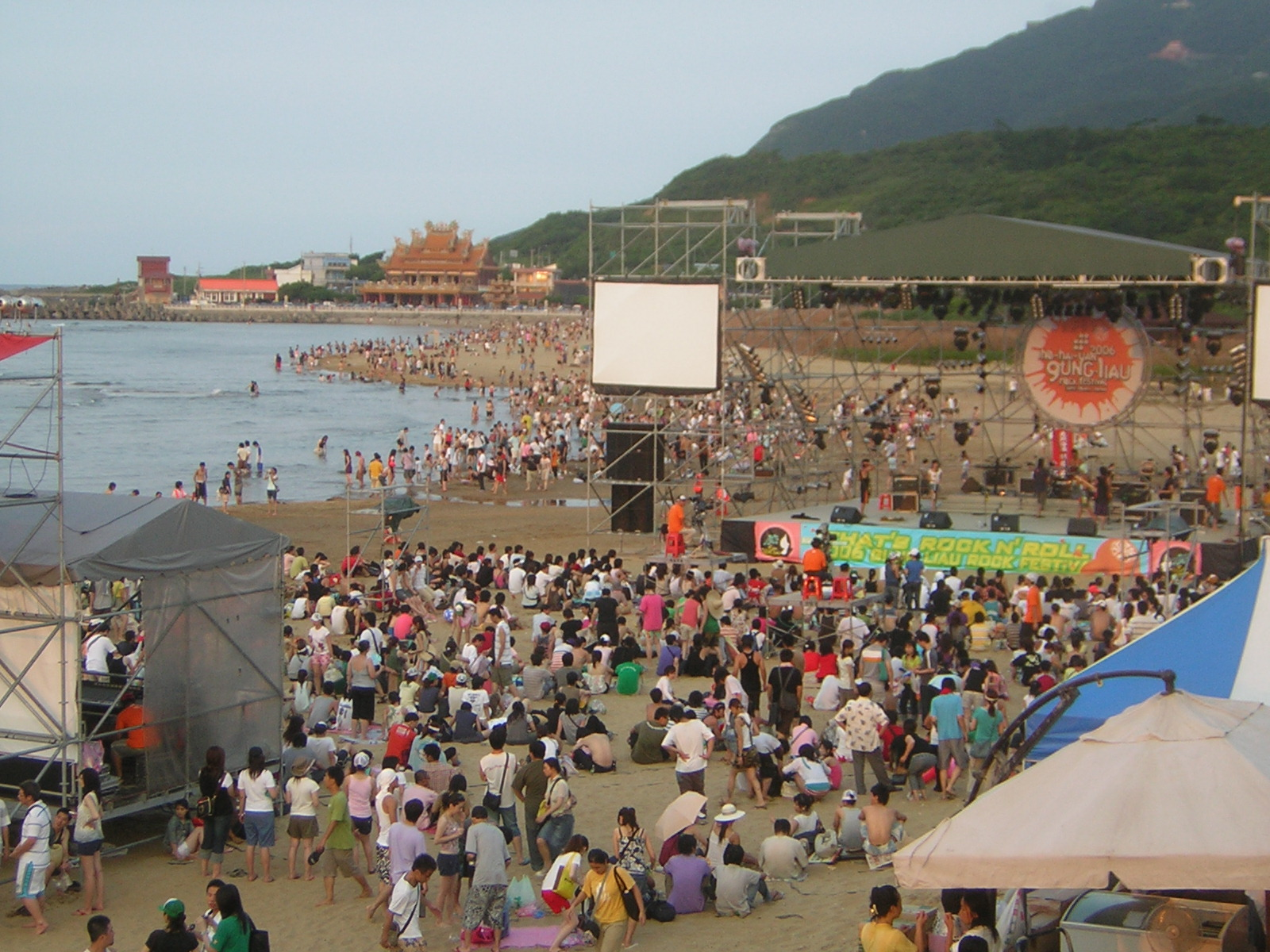
Hohaiyan Rock Festival in Gongliao District

New Taipei City has a wide range of historical, natural and cultural attractions for tourists. Tourism-related industries in the city are governed by the Tourism and Travel Department of New Taipei City Government.

=== Historical ===
Historical attractions include Bitoujiao Lighthouse, Chin Pao San, Fort Santo Domingo, Hobe Fort, Ōgon Shrine, Tamsui Old Street, Lin Family Mansion and Garden, Fuguijiao Lighthouse, Cape San Diego Lighthouse, Wuzhi Mountain Military Cemetery and Qing dynasty remnants in Tamsui and the old mining towns of Jiufen, Jinguashi and Jingtong in the east. Sanxia houses the historic Sanxia Old Street.

=== Temples ===
Temples in the city include the Changfu Temple in Sanxia District, Gongbei Temple in Xizhi District and Temple of the Eighteen Lords in Shimen District. The international headquarter of Dharma Drum Mountain, one of the "Four Great Mountains" or four major Buddhist organizations of Taiwanese Buddhism, is situated in Jinshan District.

=== Museums and galleries ===
There are numerous museums and galleries, such as Drop of Water Memorial Hall, Gold Museum, Jing-Mei White Terror Memorial Park, Jingtong Mining Industry Museum, Ju Ming Museum, Li Mei-shu Memorial Gallery, Li Tien-lu Hand Puppet Historical Museum, Museum of World Religions, New Taipei City Hakka Museum, New Taipei City Yingge Ceramics Museum, Ping-Lin Tea Museum, Sanxia History Museum, Shihsanhang Museum of Archaeology, Taiwan Coal Mine Museum, Taiwan Nougat Creativity Museum, Tamkang University Maritime Museum, Tamsui Art Gallery, Teng Feng Fish Ball Museum, Wulai Atayal Museum, Wulai Forestry Life Museum and Xinzhuang Culture and Arts Center.

=== Natural ===
Natural attractions include the Golden, Lingjiao, Shifen and Wulai waterfalls, Bitan, Wulai Hot Spring, Stone Sculpture Park, Cape Santiago, Twin Candlestick Islets, Xinhai Constructed Wetland, hoodoo geological formations at the Yehliu seacoast, and hiking in Mount Guanyin, Wulai, Pingxi and the northeast coast. Tamsui Fisherman's Wharf along the Tamsui River is a popular place for leisure and sightseeing. Popular beaches include Fulong, Yanliao and Baisha Bay.

=== Theme parks and resorts ===
Theme parks and resorts in the city include Yehliu Ocean World, Yun Hsien Resort etc.

=== Night markets ===
Night markets in the city are Lehua Night Market and Nanya Night Market.

=== Festivals ===
New Taipei City regularly hosts around 5,000 annual art, music and cultural festivals, such as the Hohaiyan Rock Festival in Gongliao District. The Lantern Festival is held regularly in the city particularly in Pingxi District, where sky lanterns are made throughout the year for people to buy. Guests can also learn how to make their own lanterns, paint their hopes, dreams and wishes on them, then release them to the sky in the hopes that their prayers will be answered.

Other festivals include the Yeliu Religious Festival, Cherry Blossom Season, Ching Shui Tsu Shih Rituals, Mazu Cultural Festival, Zhonghe Water Festival, Green Bamboo Shoot Festival, Tung Blossom Festival, Fulong Sand Sculpture Festival, Shimen International Kite Festival, Taishan Lion Dance Culture Festival, Color Play Asia etc.

== Transportation ==
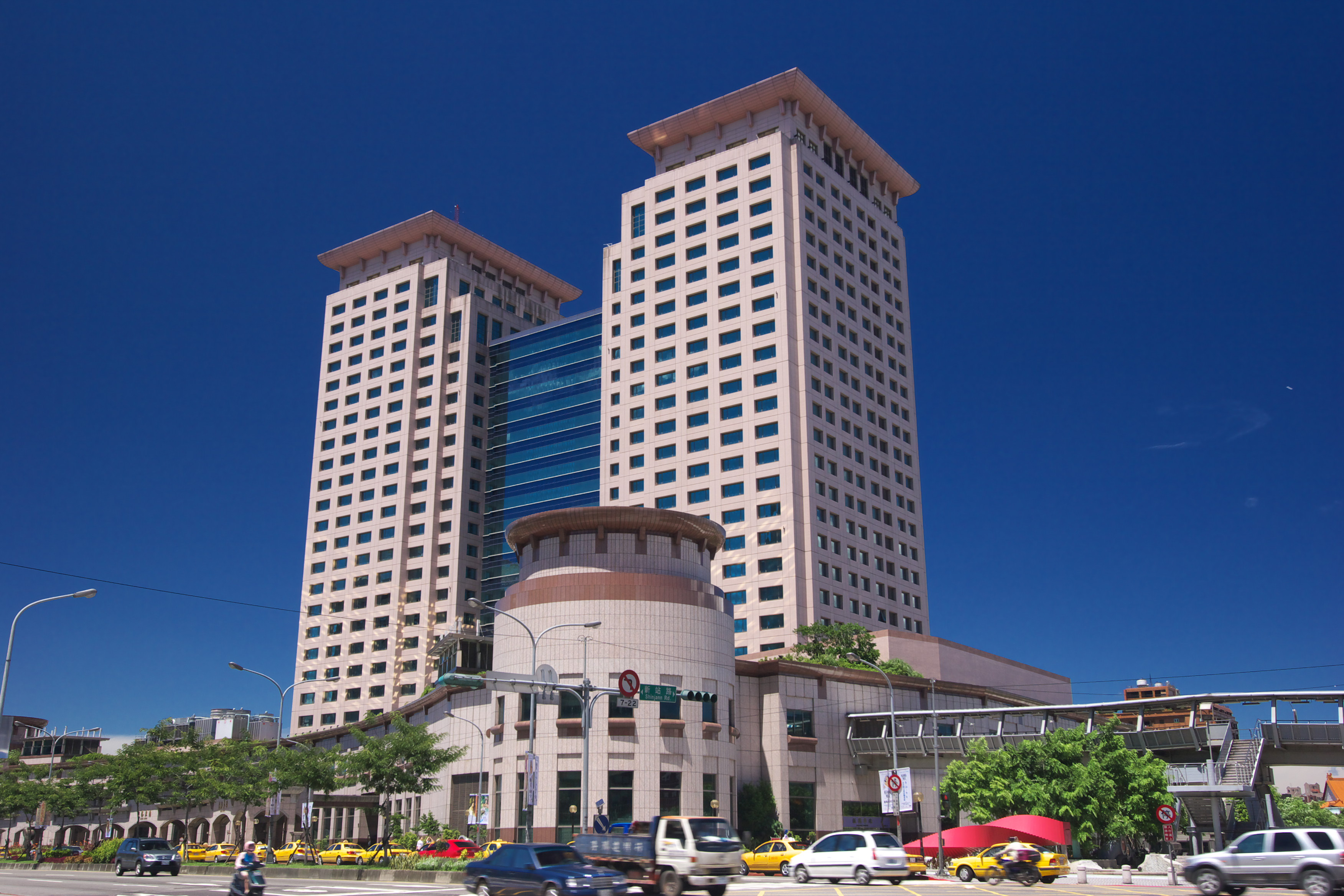
Banqiao Station

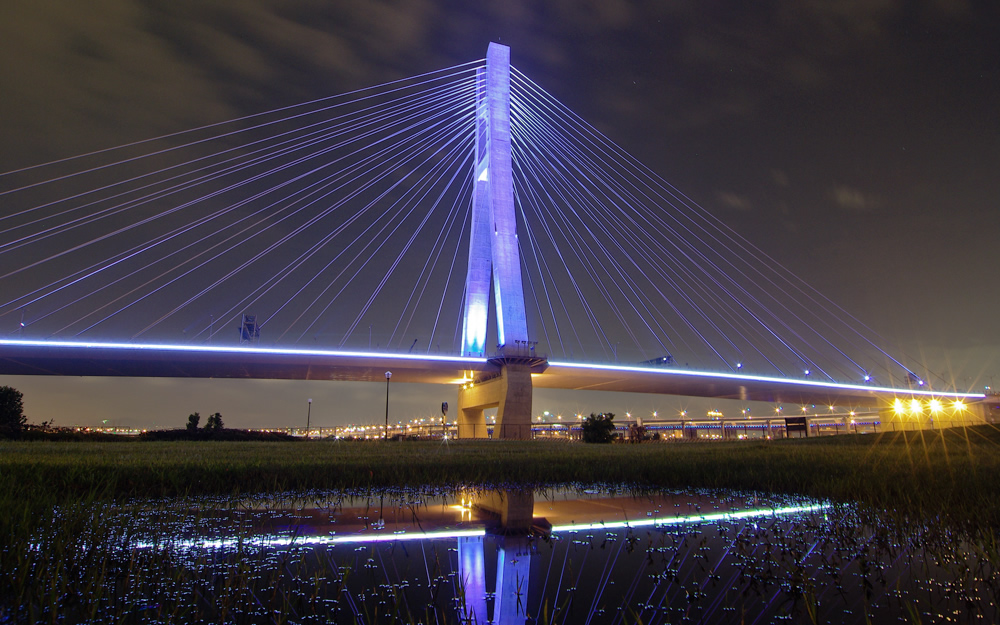
New Taipei Bridge

=== Rail ===
The area is served by Taiwan High Speed Rail through the Banqiao Station, which is an intermodal station with Taiwan Railway (TR) and Taipei Metro.

The TRA's Yilan Line runs through Gongliao, Shuangxi and Ruifang. The Western Line runs through Xizhi, Banqiao, Shulin and Yingge. The Pingxi Line connects Pingxi to Ruifang.

Wulai District houses the Wulai Scenic Train.

=== Metro ===
The Taipei Metro serves the area through the following four lines. Taipei Metro is the best way to access the city's northern, southern, and western sections.

1. Bannan line
2. Tamsui–Xinyi line
3. Songshan–Xindian line
4. Zhonghe–Xinlu line

The government's New Taipei Metro the following line:

1. Circular line

The Taoyuan Metro also serves the area through the following line:

1. Taoyuan Airport MRT

=== Light rail ===
The government's New Taipei Metro operates the following light rail line:

1. Danhai light rail
2. Ankeng light rail

=== Road ===
A famous bridge in New Taipei City is the Taipei Bridge, connecting New Taipei City with Taipei over the Tamsui River. Another famous bridge is the New Taipei Bridge.

=== Air ===
The area's air traffic is served by Taiwan Taoyuan International Airport in neighboring Taoyuan City and Songshan Airport in Taipei.

== See also ==
- Asteroid 200033 Newtaipei, named in honor of the city in 2018
- List of cities in Taiwan
