= Shihsanhang Museum of Archaeology =

Museum in Bali, New Taipei, Taiwan

- 十三行博物館
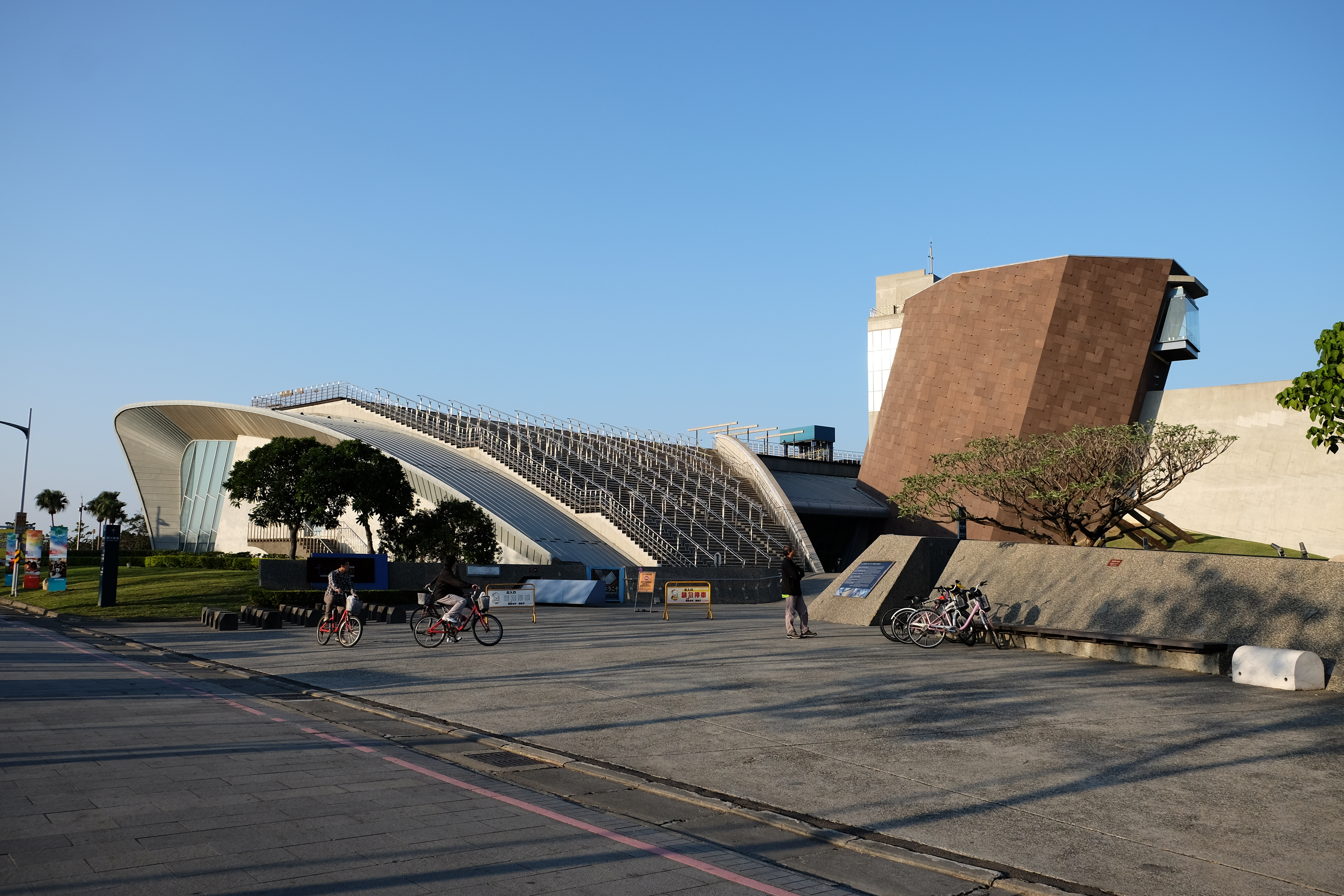
- Established: 24 April 2003
- Location: Bali, New Taipei, Taiwan
- Coordinates: 25°09′24.3″N 121°24′18.7″E
- Type: Archaeology museum
- Website: www.sshm.tpc.gov.tw

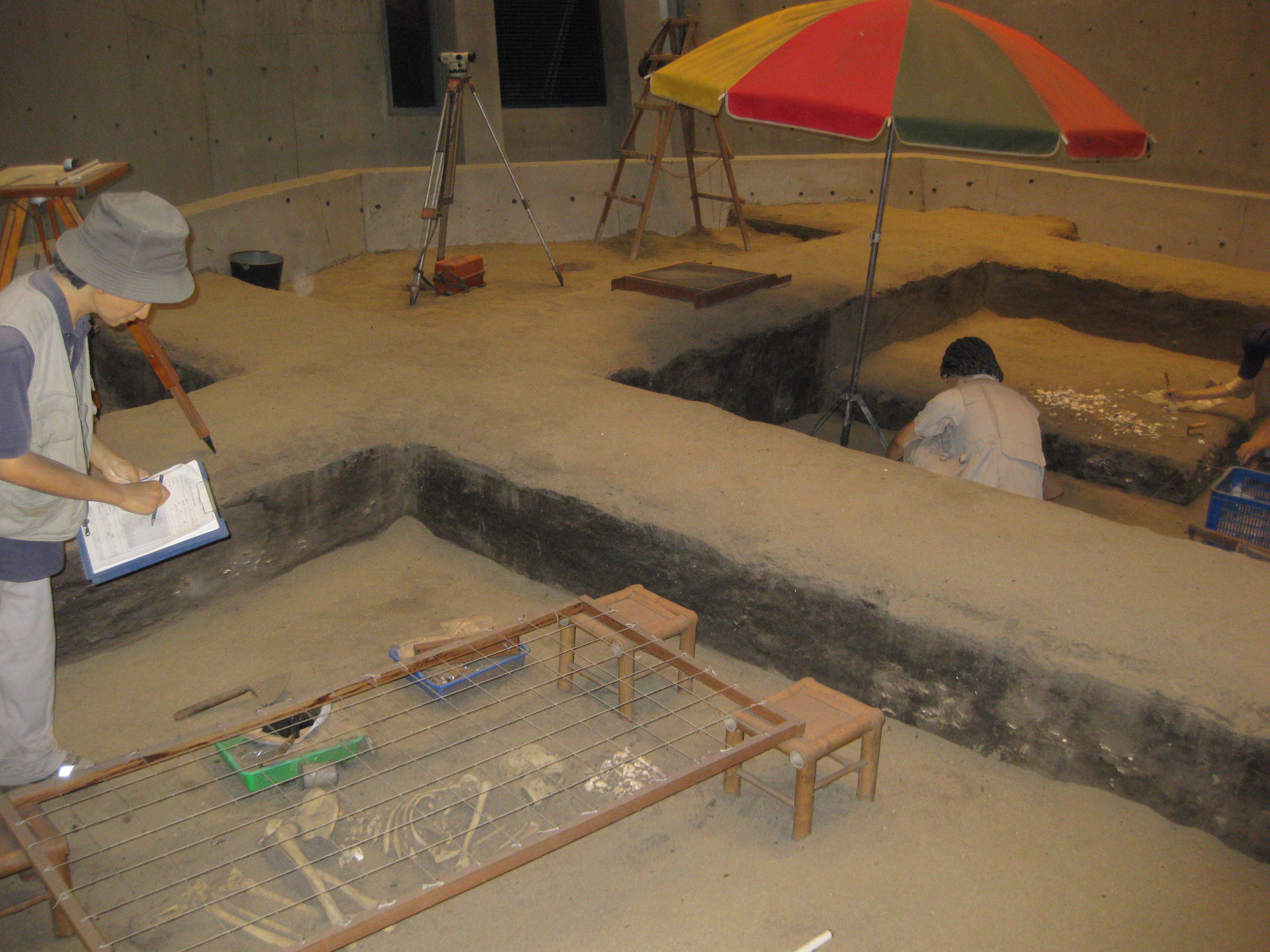
Shihsanhang Museum of Archaeology exhibition hall

The Shihsanhang Museum of Archaeology (Chinese: 十三行博物館; pinyin: Shísānháng Bówùguǎn) is an archaeological museum in Bali District, New Taipei, Taiwan. The museum conserves and displays artifacts from the Shihsanhang archaeological site.

== History ==
=== Modern ===
The origins of the museum date back to excavations undertaken at Shihsanhang in 1990. The Shihsanhang Museum was built in 1998. It includes a "Bridge of Time", that allows visitors to travel back through time to explore its civilization and culture.

In 2017, the museum became the first museum exhibiting its artifacts outside Taiwan when they held an exhibition in Miyazaki Prefecture, Japan at the Saitobaru Archaeological Museum displaying 105 artifact sets from the museum in Taiwan. The exhibition was jointly organized by scholars and experts from both sides.

=== Ancient ===
Prehistoric Shihsanhang was a wealthy settlement, it was only one of two communities in Taiwan to master iron smelting. The ironwares they produced were traded throughout Taiwan. This wealth is responsible for the large number of grave goods buried with the dead at Shihsanhang which form the core of the museum's current collection.

== Geology ==
The museum is located at the foot of Guanyin Mountain near the mouth of the Tamsui River.

== Archaeology ==
The archaeological site dates back 1,800 years to the Iron Age. Over 300 skeletons have been unearthed dating from 1,800 to 600 years old. The burial customs of the people at Shihsanhang were unique, according to Kuo Su-chiu, "All the skeletons were buried in a fetal position: on their sides with their limbs bent. Except one, an adult female, who was buried on her front and with her head turned to one side, which is typical of the contemporaneous Fantsuyuan (番仔園) Culture of central western Taiwan."

== Architecture ==
The architecture of the museum has an archaeological theme, reflecting ancient civilization in Taiwan islandwide and in its outlying minor islands.

== Transportation ==
The museum is accessible by bus from Guandu Station of Taipei Metro.

== See also ==
- List of museums in Taiwan
