= Taiyang Gold Mine Office =

Former office building in Ruifang, New Taipei, Taiwan

- 台陽礦業事務所
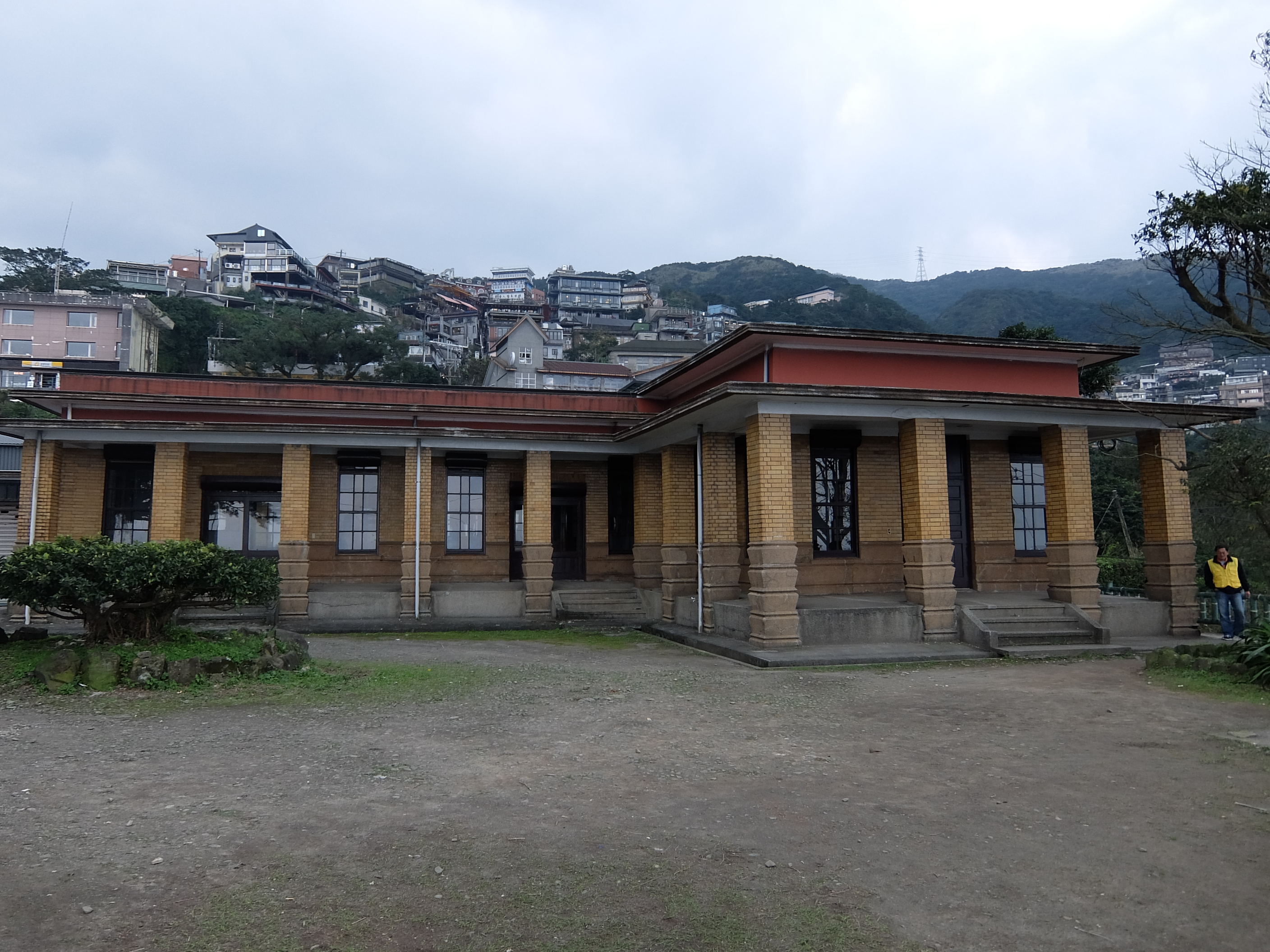
- Interactive map of the Taiyang Gold Mine Office area

General information
- Type: former office
- Location: Ruifang, New Taipei, Taiwan
- Coordinates: 25°06′36.6″N 121°50′34.1″E
- Completed: 1937

The Taiyang Gold Mine Office (traditional Chinese: 台陽礦業事務所; simplified Chinese: 台阳矿业事务所; pinyin: Táiyáng Kuàngyè Shìwù Suǒ) is a former office building in Jiufen, Ruifang District, New Taipei, Taiwan.

== History ==
The office building was constructed in 1918 by Yen Brothers 【顏國年 & 顏雲年】 Taiyang Mining Company as the administration and management center of the company. After the decline of the mining industry in the area in 1971, the office building was renovated into an exhibition center. The building was declared a historical building in 2003.

== Architecture ==
The building is divided into several sections, which are the director's office, supervisor's office, engineering department, mining department, mine selection department, warehouse, management department and auditorium.

== See also ==
- List of tourist attractions in Taiwan
- Mining in Taiwan
