= Remains of the 13 Levels =

Former factory in Ruifang, New Taipei, Taiwan

- 十三層遺址
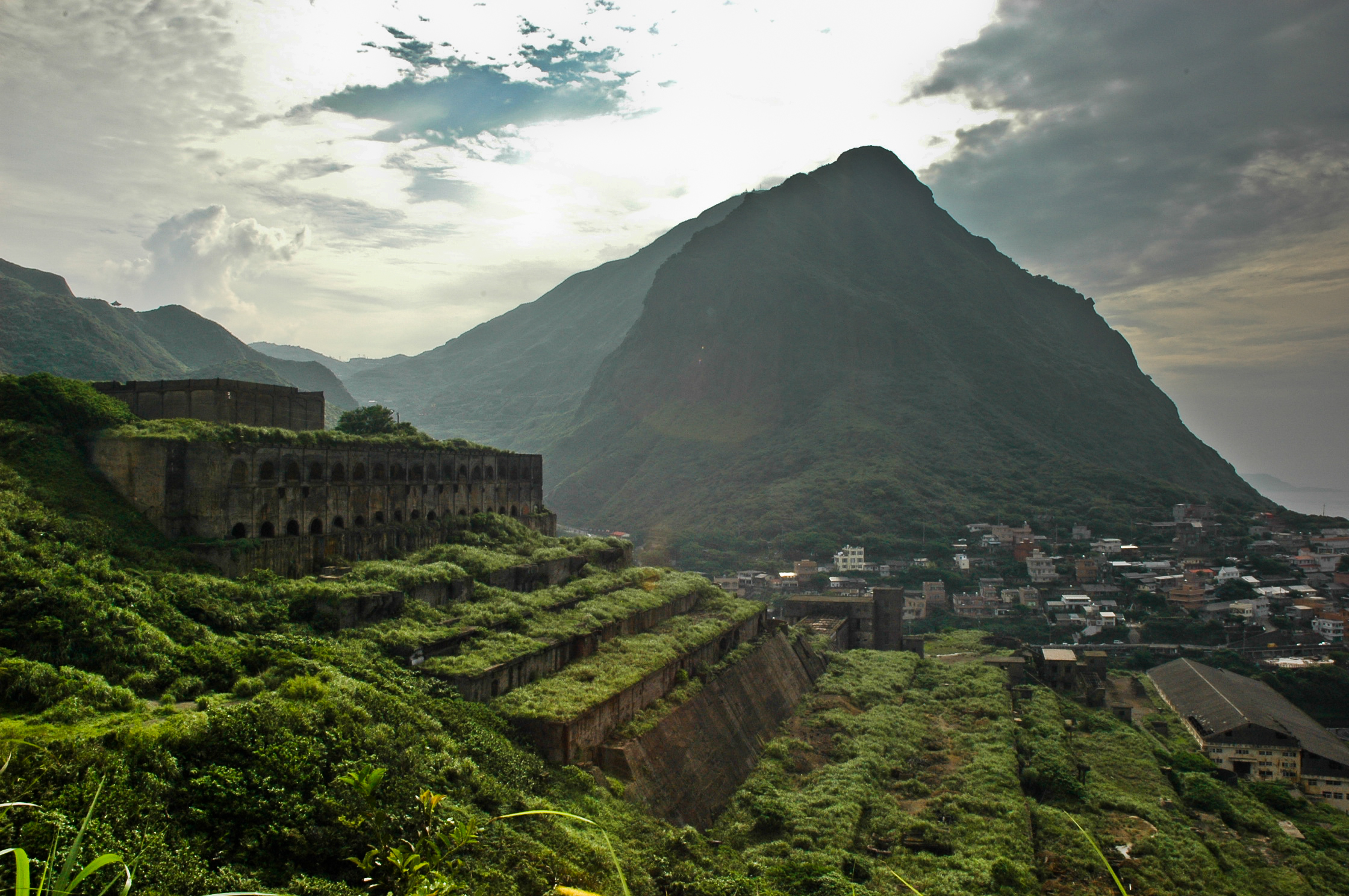

- Location within Taiwan

General information
- Type: former smelter plant
- Location: Ruifang, New Taipei City, Taiwan
- Coordinates: 25°07′05.8″N 121°51′52.8″E

The Remains of the 13 Levels (traditional Chinese: 十三層遺址; simplified Chinese: 十三层遗址; pinyin: Shísān Céng Yízhǐ) is a former smelter plant in Lianxin Village, Ruifang District, New Taipei City, Taiwan. It is also called the Potala Palace of Mountain Mines.

== History ==
Originally built in 1933 by Japanese during their occupation, the building used to be a copper and gold smelter plant called the Shuinandong Smelter that used to process refined ore from Jinguashi and Jiufen. After the handover of Taiwan from Japan to the Republic of China in 1945, the refinery was taken over by the state-run company. In 1973, the copper and gold minerals from the area had been exhausted and subsequently the activity and company were shut down.

During World War II between 1942 and 1945, the Japanese Empire sent approximately one thousand prisoners of war (POWs) to the gold mines surrounding the smelting plant. The POWs were from allied nations, including the United Kingdom, Canada, the Netherlands, Australia, New Zealand, South Africa and the United States. The Taiwan POW Memorial Park now stands in memory of the POWs that died in the harsh mining conditions.

The site and the surrounding mining infrastructure are listed as potential world heritage sites.

== Architecture ==
The building has three long exhaust pipes running up the hillside, which released toxic exhaust gasses when it was in operation. At a length of 2 km and a diameter of 2 meters, it is the world's longest pipe.

== Popular culture ==
The building has been featured in several music videos.

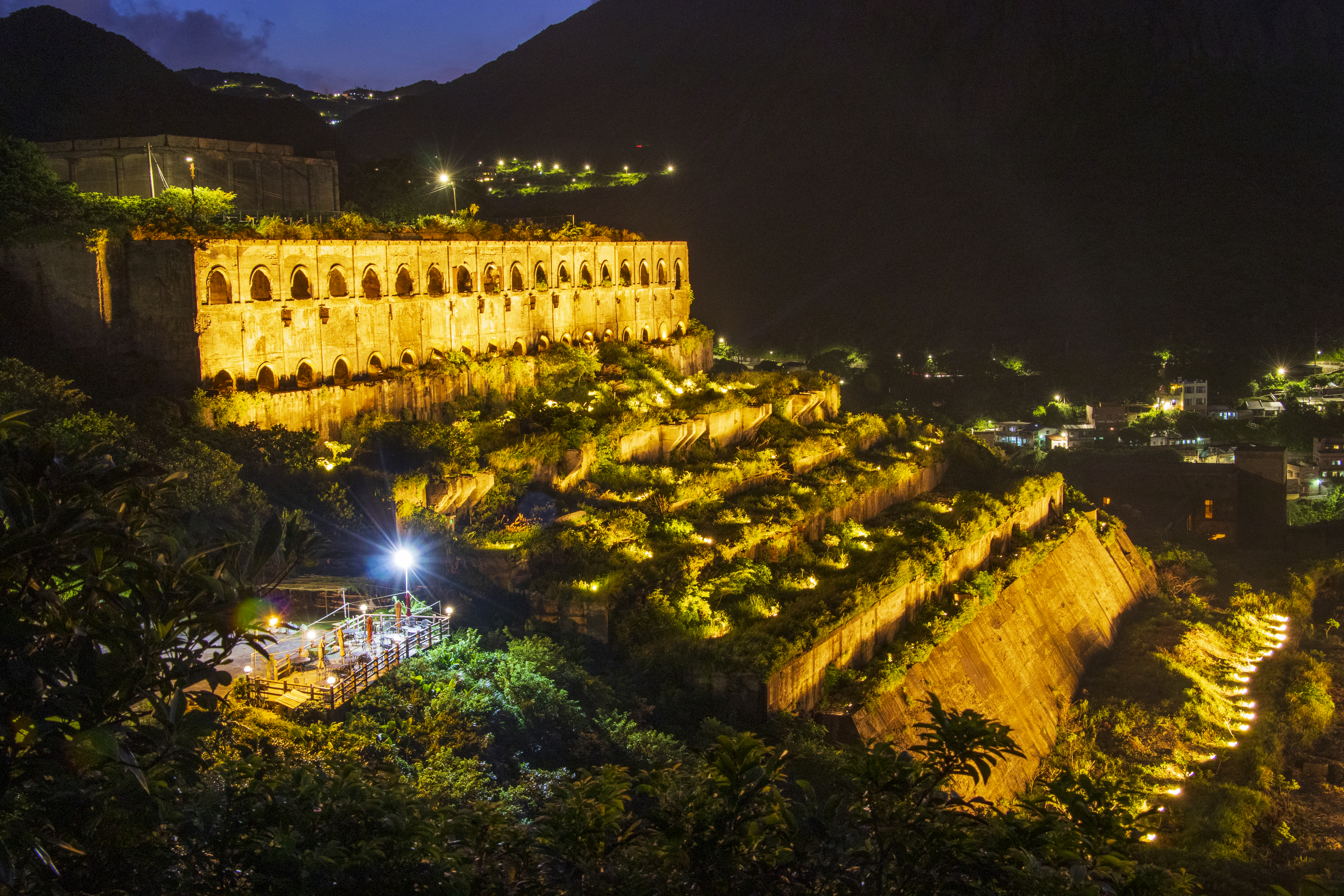
The building under illuminations

The building was illuminated for the 2019 Moon Festival as a collaboration between the current owner, Taiwan Power Company, and two artists Chou Lien (周鍊) and Joyce Ho (何采柔).

== See also ==
- Mining in Taiwan
