= Yu Yonghe =

- Born: Renhe, Zhejiang
- Occupations: Miner, trader, traveller, writer

Yu Yonghe (Chinese: 郁永河; pinyin: Yù Yǒnghé; Pe̍h-ōe-jī: Iok Éng-hô) was a traveler from China whose adventures are recorded in Small Sea Travel Diaries (裨海紀遊). The book contributes significantly to the research on the historical development of Taiwan (Formosa) in the seventeenth century.

== Biography ==
Yu Yonghe was born before 1650 in the city of Renhe, Zhejiang province. Modern scholars regard Yu as a unique figure of his time because of several factors. For instance, although traveling was not uncommon at his time, Yu was known to have travelled to every corner of Fujian and to Taiwan. Furthermore, in his accounts of the Taiwanese aborigines and Zheng family (entitled 番境補遺, 偽鄭逸事, respectively), he shows his knowledge of those people and lands were extraordinary for his era.

Under the consent of the Fujian officials, Yu travelled to Taiwan following the explosion of the Fuzhou gunpowder stores in 1696 to mine sulfur. Yu's voyage began at the coast to Xiamen, crossing the Taiwan Strait and coming to a halt in Penghu before arriving in Tainan. Yu then journeyed northward to Tamsui and Beitou where he bought amorphous sulfur from local Aborigines for the making of pure sulfur. The expedition lasted ten months.

Eventually Yu returned to Fuzhou with a memoir of his ten month journey. The memoir chronicles Yu's life in Taiwan under Qing rule where he was introduced to the unique culture of the island. It subsequently became Small Sea Travel Diaries (sometimes translated The Small Sea Travel Records or Small Sea Travelogue). As Yu was on a mission collecting sulfur, his book is also referred to as the Sulfur Extraction Diaries (採硫日記).

When Yu arrived in Taiwan, the island had been under the administration of the Qing dynasty for 13 years. Yu not only recorded the developments of the era, he also took into account the administrative structures passed down by the Dutch and Zheng dynasty.

== See also ==
- History of Taiwan
- Mining in Taiwan
