= Small Sea Travel Diaries =

1697 book by Yu Yung-ho

Small Sea Travel Diaries (Chinese: 裨海紀遊), also known as Sulfur Mining Diaries (採硫日記), was written by Yu Yonghe, an official of the Qing Dynasty. The book describes the landscapes and local customs of Taiwan in the 17th century.

In 1696, there was a need for sulfur in Fuzhou, Fujian for the production of gunpowder. However, there was no sulfur in Fuchou, so Yu Yonghe volunteered to go to Taiwan. He arrived in Tainan on February 25, 1697, and stayed there for over two months, buying tools for sulfur mining and refining. Ignoring the advice of his friends, he personally led a team north by land on April 7 and arrived at Peit’ou (北投), a sulfur production area, on April 27. In the book, he recorded the scenes during the sea voyage from China to Taiwan, the peculiar journey across the Black Water Ditch (Taiwan Strait), and the local customs in Taiwan. Although Yu traveled in a hurry, he still recorded many Indigenous tribes in Taiwan at the end of the 17th century.

Historian Yang He-chih (楊龢之) believes that Small Sea Travel Diaries provides modern people with an imagination of the world in 1697, when most of the land was still untouched by agricultural society, except for the areas near Tainan.

Huang Wen-te (黃文德), an editor of the National Central Library, believes that Yu Yung-ho's observations on Taiwan's nature, culture, history, and the ethical thinking of intellectuals make Small Sea Travel Diaries a unique work. The book was different from the works of traditional Chinese literati, who blindly despised the Indigenous people or treated the tribes and their unique customs, which were different from Han culture, as subjects of "curious hunting”. Instead, the book served as a confession of the Han people's misunderstanding of the aborigines, which gave the book itself a special status.

An English translation by Macabe Keliher (2004) is published by SMC Publishing in Taipei.
