= Houtong railway station =

Railway station in New Taipei, Taiwan

Houtong 猴硐車站
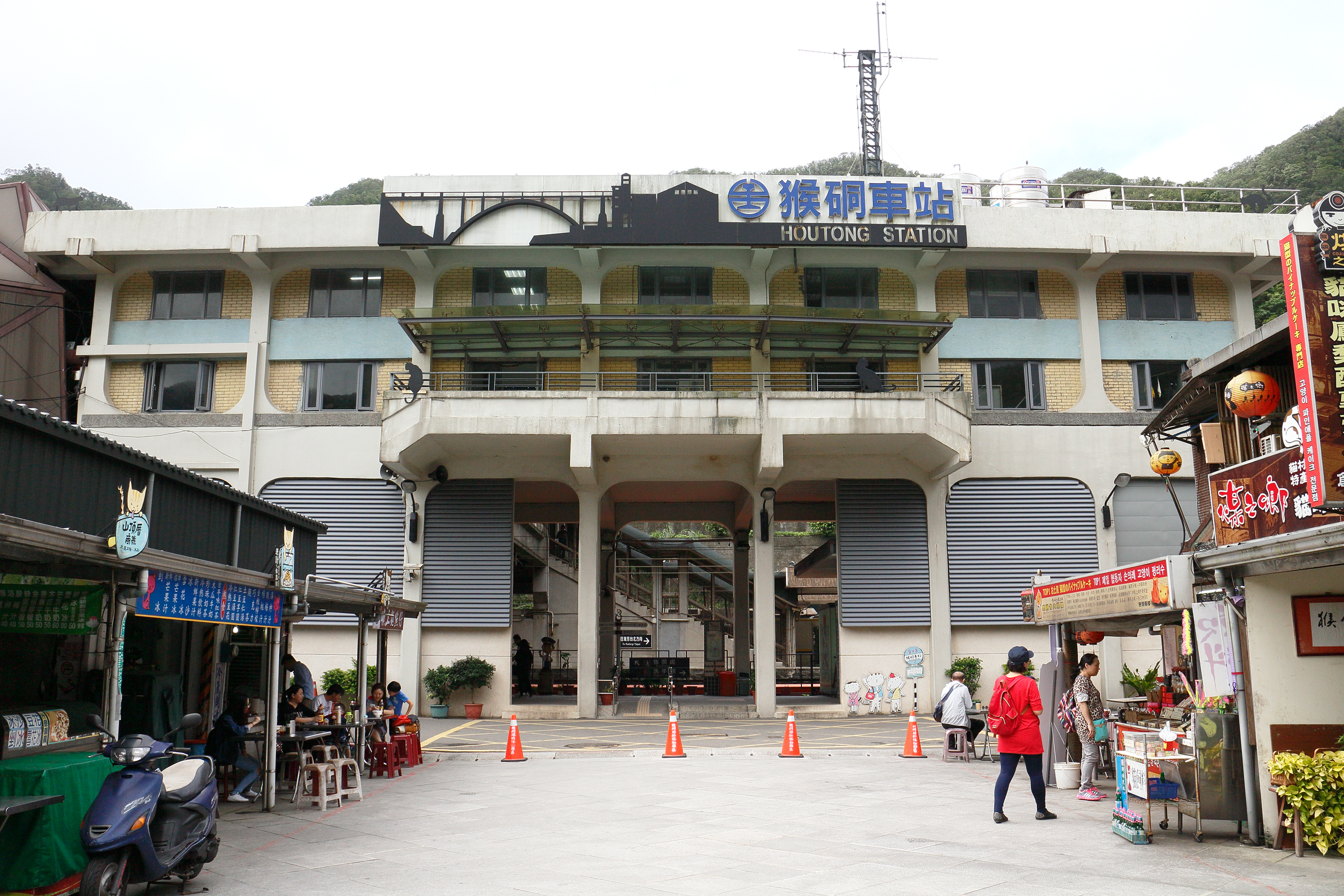

General information
- Location: Ruifang, New Taipei, Taiwan
- Coordinates: 25°05′14.0″N 121°49′39.7″E
- System: Train station
- Owner: Taiwan Railway Corporation
- Operator: Taiwan Railway Corporation
- Line: Eastern Trunk line
- Train operators: Taiwan Railway Corporation

History
- Opened: 27 January 1920

Passengers
- 1,543 daily (2024)

Services
Preceding station	Taiwan Railway	Following station
Ruifang towards Badu	Eastern Trunk line	Sandiaoling towards Taitung
Location

Houtong (Chinese: 猴硐車站; pinyin: Hóudòng Chēzhàn) is a railway station on the Taiwan Railway Yilan line located in Ruifang District, New Taipei, Taiwan. Houtong once sat on top of Taiwan's largest coal mine, but now visitors come to see the numerous cats living in the town.

== Name ==
In 1920, during Japanese rule, the station was established as Kōdō-eki (Japanese: 猴硐驛). In 1962, the name was modified (Chinese: 侯硐; Pe̍h-ōe-jī: Kâu-tōng), but returned to the original in 2013. In Taiwanese Hokkien, the station name is announced as Kau-tong-a (Chinese: 猴洞仔; Pe̍h-ōe-jī: Kâu-tōng-á).

== Gallery ==
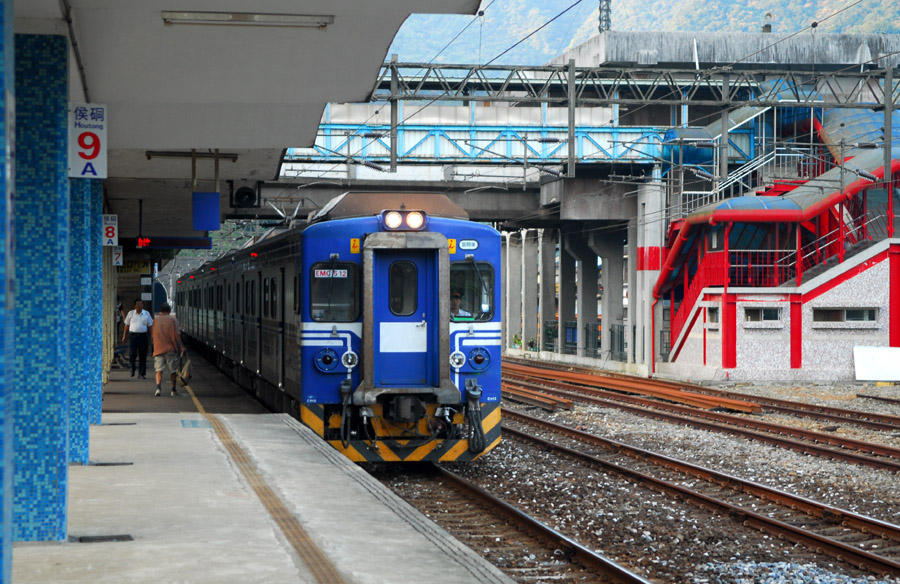
Station platform

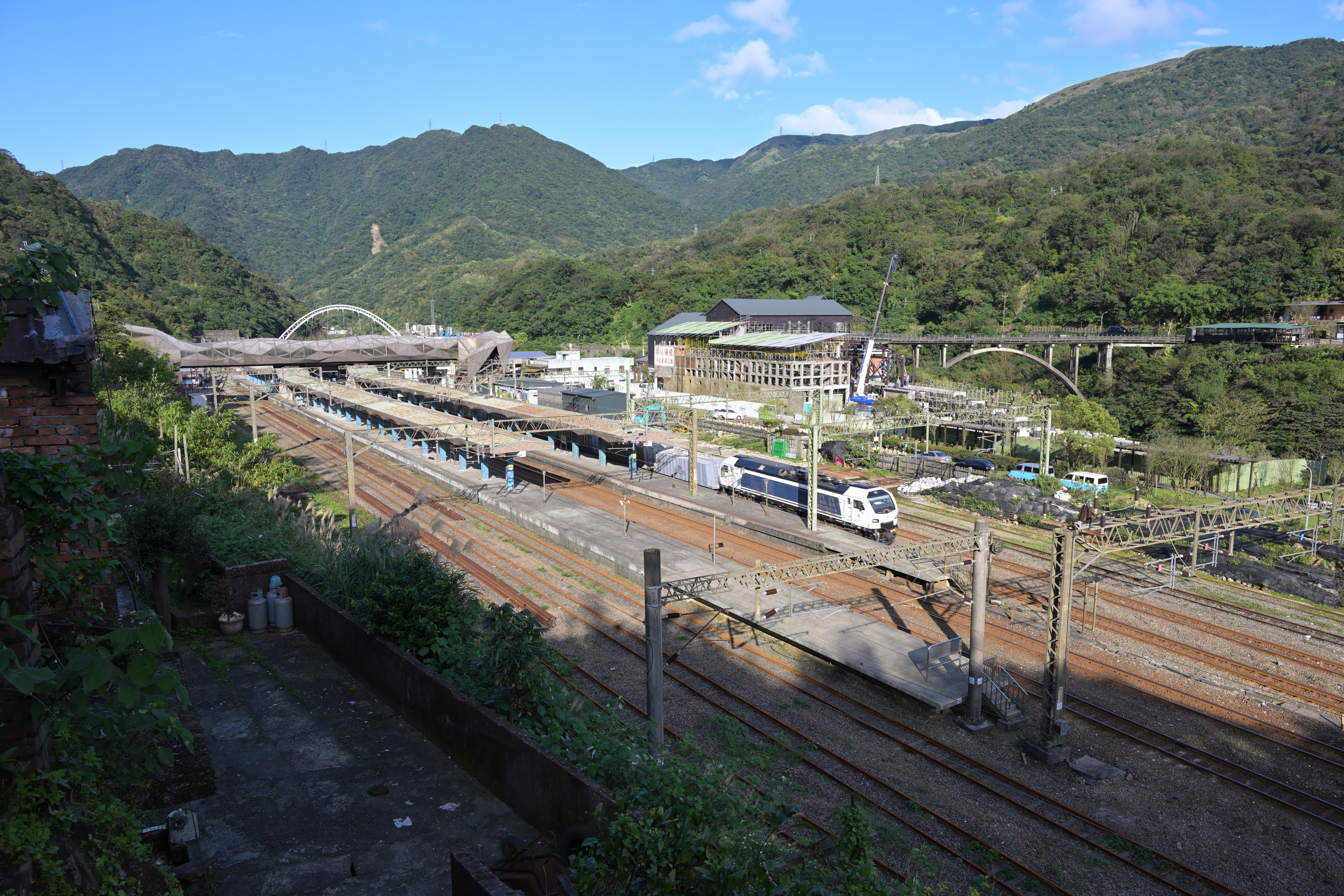
Station platforms and surroundings

== Around the station ==
- Houtong Cat Village
- Houtong Coal Mine Ecological Park

== See also ==
- List of railway stations in Taiwan
