= Bitoujiao Lighthouse =

Lighthouse in Ruifang, New Taipei, Taiwan

Bitoujiao Lighthouse Pitou Chiao
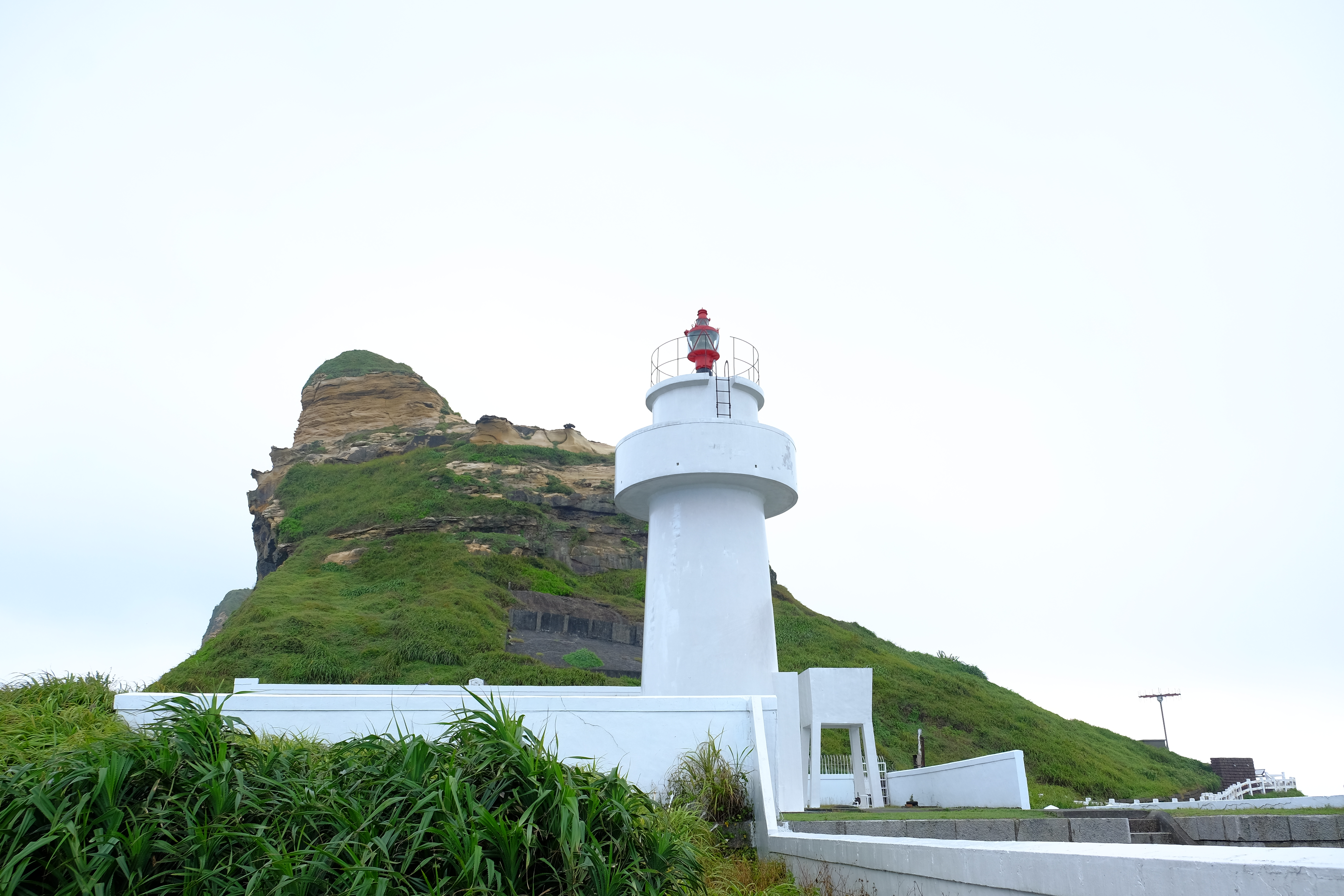
- Location: Cape Bitoujiao; Ruifang District; New Taipei; Taiwan
- Coordinates: 25°07′43.7″N 121°55′24.0″E

Tower
- Constructed: 1897 (first)
- Construction: concrete tower
- Height: 12.3 metres (40 ft)
- Shape: cylindrical tower with double balcony and lantern
- Markings: white tower and lantern
- Power source: mains electricity
- Operator: Northeast Coast National Scenic Area

Light
- First lit: 1971 (current)
- Focal height: 65.3 metres (214 ft)
- Range: 16.6 nautical miles (30.7 km; 19.1 mi)
- Characteristic: Oc W 11s.

The Bitoujiao Lighthouse or Pitou Chiao Lighthouse (traditional Chinese: 鼻頭角燈塔; simplified Chinese: 鼻头角灯塔; pinyin: Bítóujiǎo Dēngtǎ) is a lighthouse at Bitou Cape in Ruifang District, New Taipei, Taiwan.

== History ==
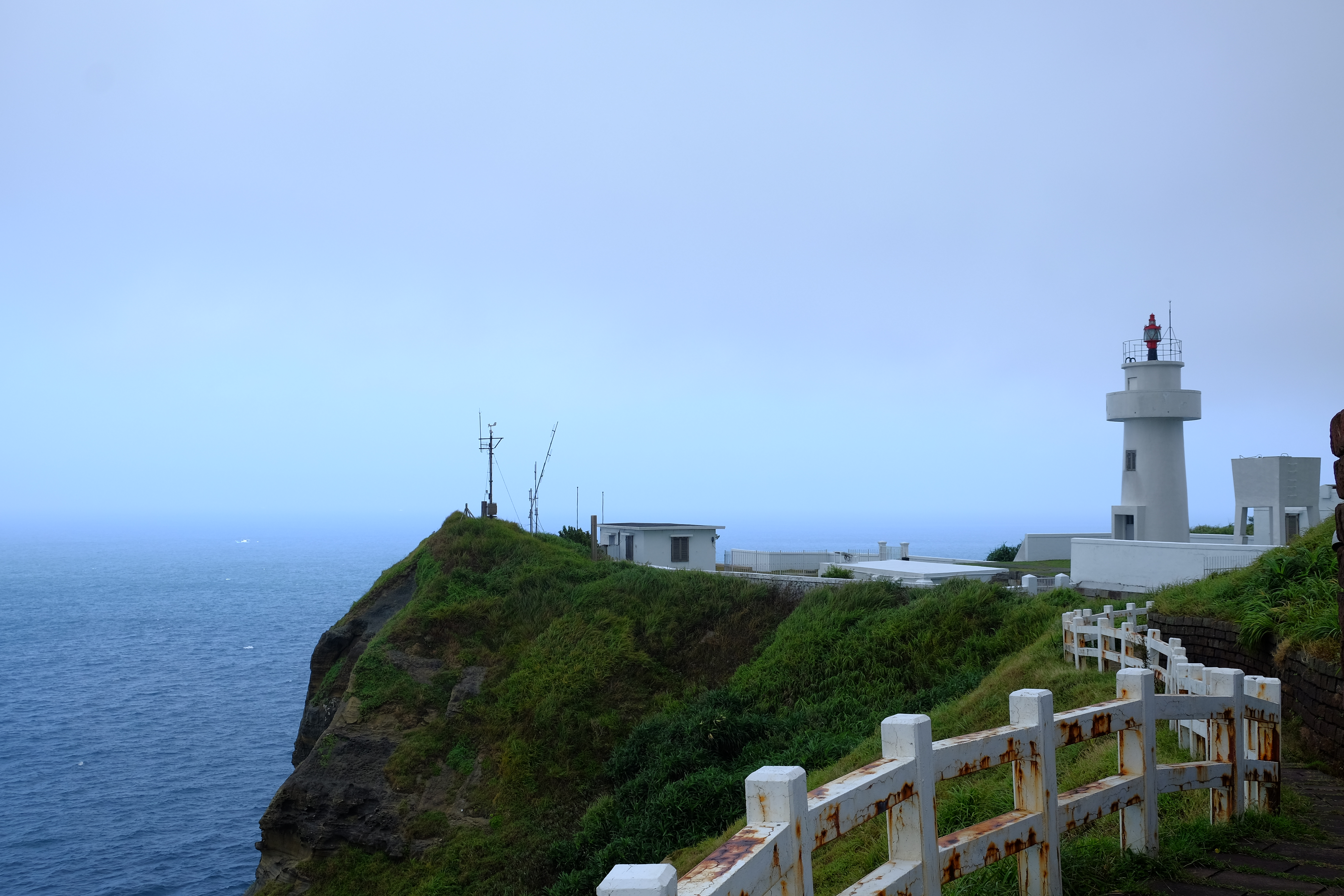
Bitoujiao Lighthouse at Bitou Cape

The lighthouse was originally built by the Japanese in 1897. In 1971, it was repaired due to damage caused by World War II.

== Architecture ==
The lighthouse is a white concrete round tower with a height of 12.3 meters.

== See also ==
- List of tourist attractions in Taiwan
- List of lighthouses in Taiwan
