= Houtong Cat Village =

Village in Ruifang, New Taipei, Taiwan

Houtong Cat Village 猴硐貓村
- Village
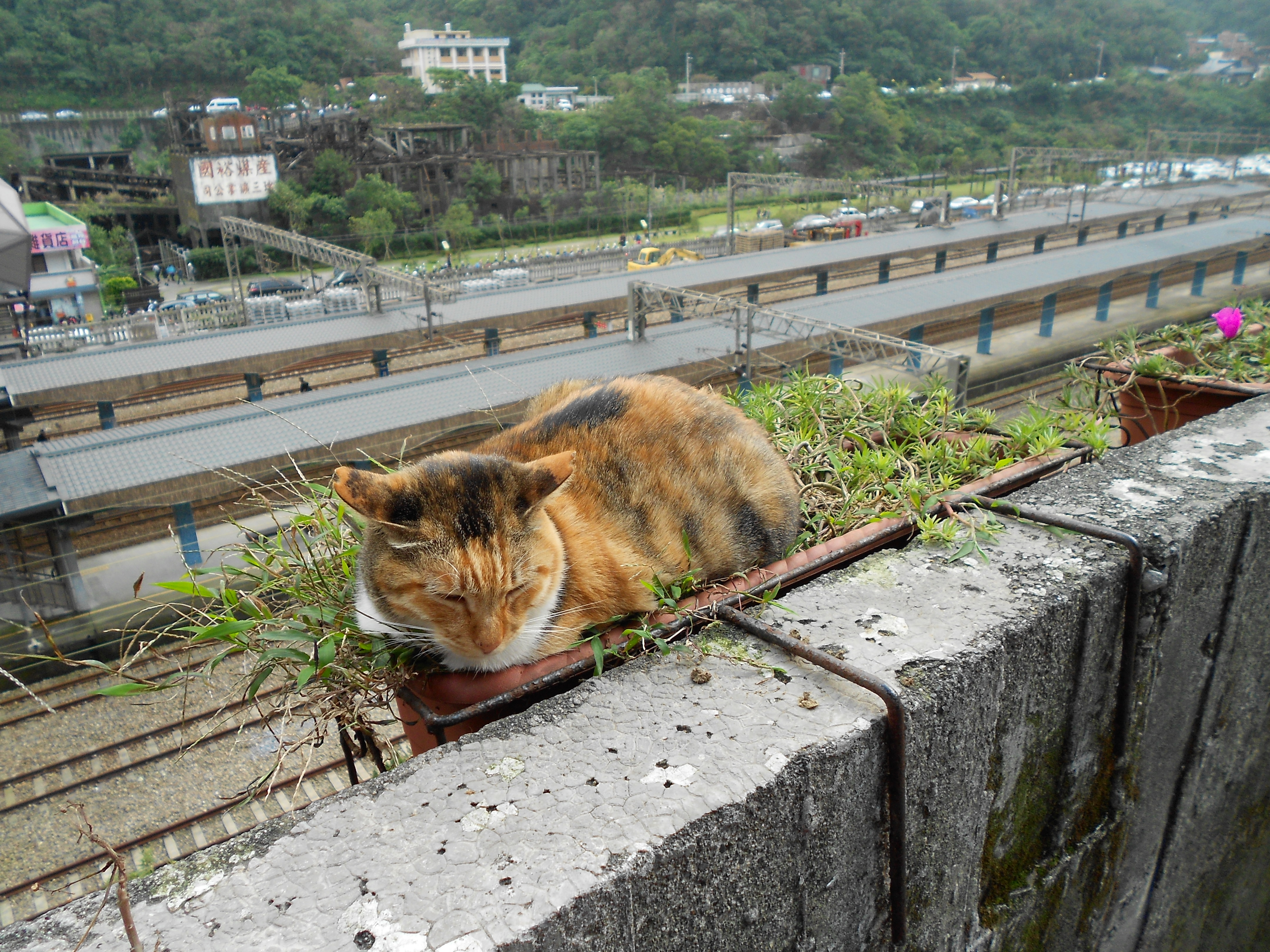
- Interactive map of Houtong Cat Village
- Coordinates: 25°05′13.5″N 121°49′35.8″E
- Location: Ruifang, New Taipei, Taiwan

The Houtong Cat Village or Houdong Cat Village (Chinese: 猴硐貓村; pinyin: Hóudòng Māo Cūn) is a village in Ruifang District, New Taipei, Taiwan known for its cat population.

== Name ==
Houtong was originally called Kau-tong (Chinese: 猴洞; Pe̍h-ōe-jī: kâu-tōng; lit. 'monkey cave') due to the existence of a cave inhabited by monkeys in the early days.

== History ==
Houtong was once a small, rich mining village in Ruifang, renowned for a well-preserved culture surrounding its railway which was built during the Japanese rule of Taiwan. During its peak economic period, it produced around 220,000 tons of coal annually, the largest coal output of a single area in Taiwan. This attracted many immigrants to the area, which further spurred the village's growth to as many as 900 households with a population of more than 6,000 people. The last facility built in the area was a coal purification factory, built in 1920.

As the coal mining industry began to decline in the 1990s, the area also declined. Young residents began to look for job opportunities elsewhere outside the village, with only a few hundred residents remaining.

In 2008, a local cat lover organized an activity to save abandoned cats around the village. They posted the cats' pictures online, resulting in an overwhelming response from other cat lovers around the nation. Soon, Houtong became a center for cat lovers as the words spread, and the number of cats living there increased, which eventually revived the declining village, and transforming it into a tourist destination. Some cats are sterilized, and will have one of their ears trimmed as confirmation – this helps to keep check on the local population of cats, and also helps identify new cats which enter into the village.

== Features ==
The village features shops, cafes and relaxing places for tourists. It is also located near the origin of the Keelung River. The pristine, green waters of the river are accessible via steps. Drivers entering the town are greeted with a sign that reads "A lot of stray cats here. Drive slowly." A special bridge has been constructed above the busy railway, to allow safe passage for the cats.

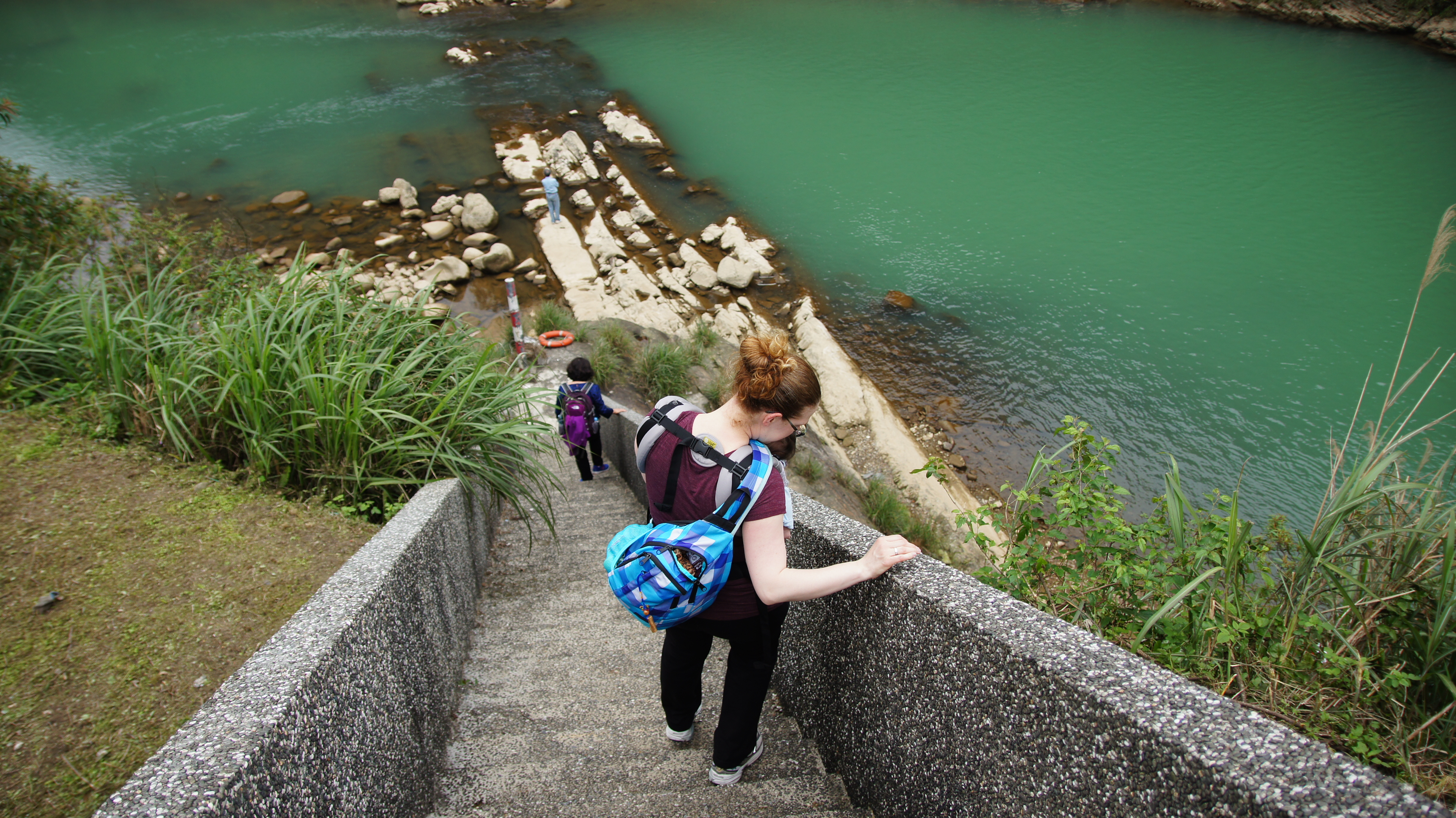
Access to the Keelung River is available via stairway.

== Transportation ==
The village is accessible from Houtong Station of Taiwan Railway. From Jiufen, it is approximately 10 minutes and NT 350 by taxi, which makes it a good secondary destination after Jiufen if planning a day trip. Houtong is also the origin of two trails which can be hiked to reach Jiufen.

== See also ==
- Mining in Taiwan
- List of endemic species of Taiwan
