= Houtong Coal Mine Ecological Park =

Former coal mine in Ruifang, New Taipei, Taiwan

- 猴硐煤礦博物園區
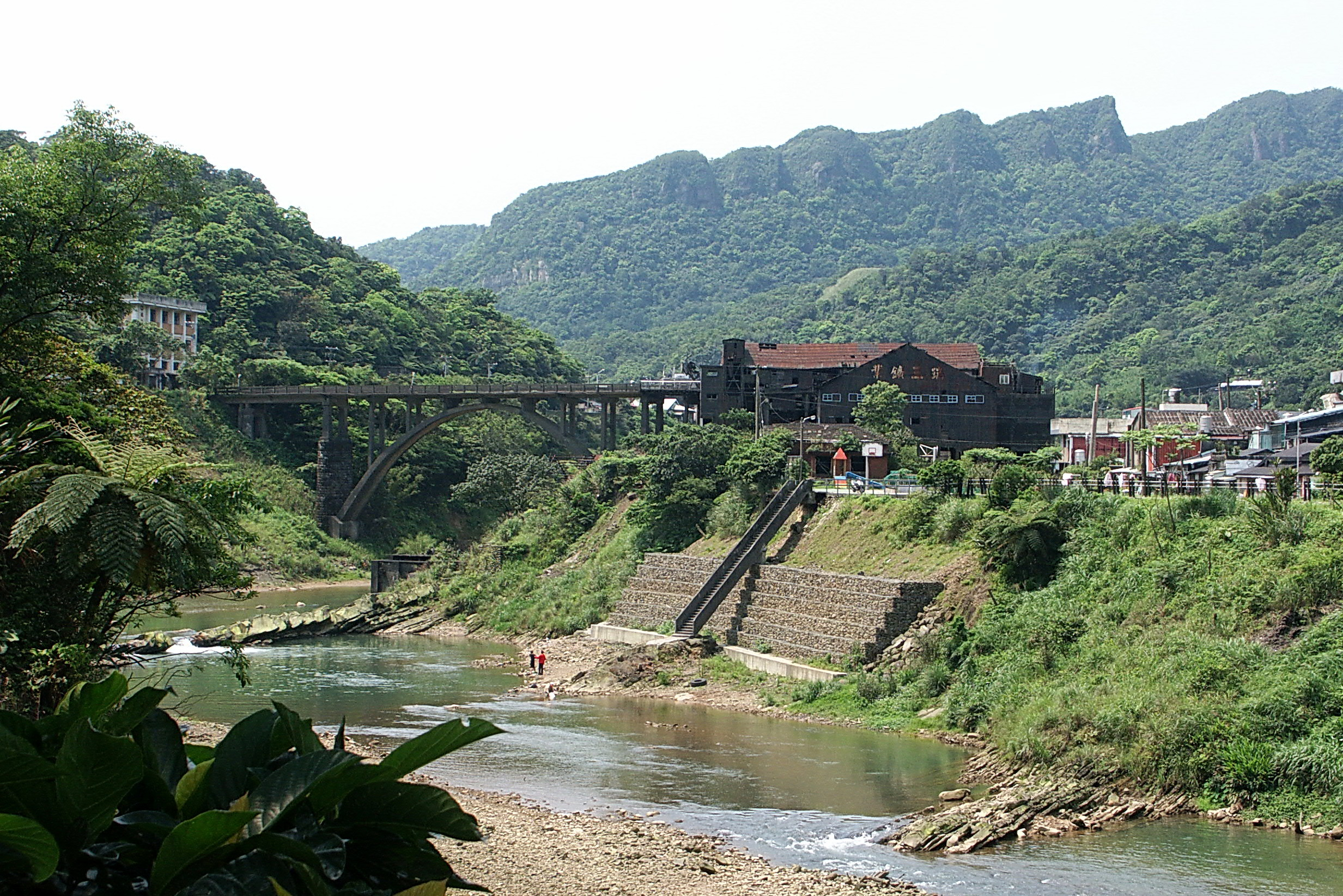
- Interactive map of Houtong Coal Mine Ecological Park
- Type: former coal mine
- Location: Ruifang, New Taipei, Taiwan
- Coordinates: 25°05′12.3″N 121°49′40.3″E
- Public transit: Houtong Station

The Houtong Coal Mine Ecological Park (traditional Chinese: 猴硐煤礦博物園區; simplified Chinese: 猴硐煤矿博物园区; pinyin: Hóudòng Méikuàng Bówù Yuánqū) is a former coal mine in Ruifang District, New Taipei, Taiwan.

== History ==
The park used to be a coal mine in the region. The mine began operating in 1930 and was taken over by the Ruisan Mining Company in 1934. The mine closed in 1990. Both men and women worked at the mine until 1963.

== Mine ==
The mine workings are 6 kilometers long and up to a half kilometer deep. The mine contains 300 km of narrow gauge railway track. Due to its size and length of operation more coal was extracted from the Ruisan mine than any other mine in Taiwan. Due to the high temperatures underground the miners often wore little or no clothing.

== Architecture ==
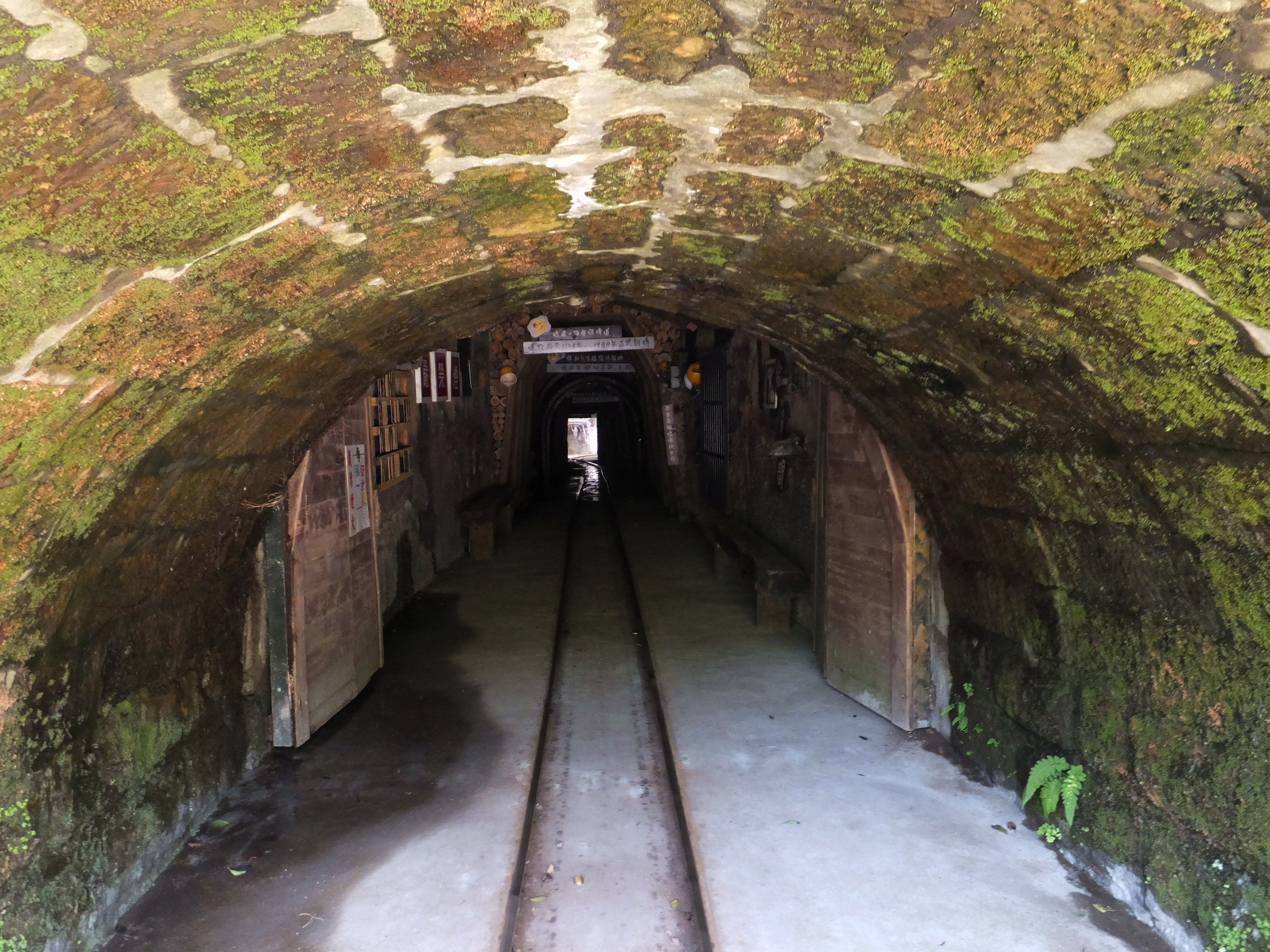
Houtongkeng Coal Pit

The park consists of various buildings built during the Japanese rule and coal-related structures, such as coal transportation bridge, coal preparation plant, historical trail etc.

== Transportation ==
The park is accessible within walking distance from Houtong Station of Taiwan Railway.

== See also ==
- Mining in Taiwan
