= Golden Waterfall =

Waterfall in Ruifang, New Taipei, Taiwan

Golden Waterfall 黃金瀑布
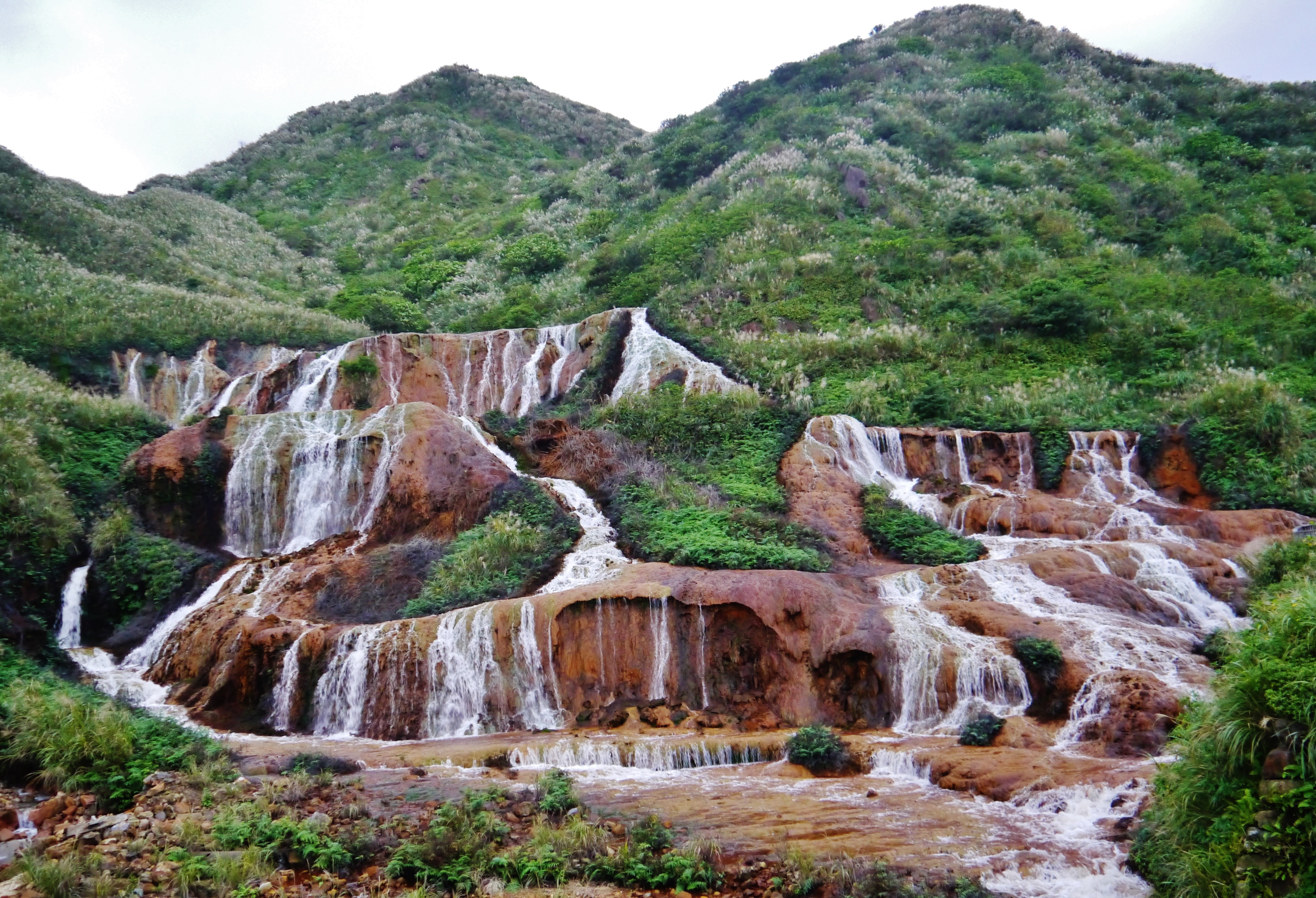
- Interactive map of Golden Waterfall 黃金瀑布
- Location: Ruifang, New Taipei, Taiwan
- Coordinates: 25°7′1.8″N 121°51′41.4″E
- Type: waterfall

The Golden Waterfall (Chinese: 黃金瀑布; pinyin: Huángjīn Pùbù) is a waterfall located near a village named Jiufen in Ruifang District, New Taipei, Taiwan.

== Geology ==
The waterfall runs off into what is called the Yin-Yang Sea, and because of the color of the water, it has long been assumed that it was polluted. However, recently it has been discovered that the color of the water is a natural occurrence. The soil and the water that runs off contains many minerals including sulfur, arsenic, and copper ore, which give the water its golden color. However, the water is very toxic because of the high amount of metal minerals in the water, and people are advised to not get into the water. The rocks in the waterfall have acquired a yellow color over time due to the levels of arsenic and other minerals in the water.

Nearby the waterfall are an old gold mining factory and the Yin-Yang Sea, which the waterfall runs into.

== History ==
There is an old Gold Mining Factory nearby the Golden Waterfall that dates back to the time of the Japanese occupation in Taiwan. It was because of this mining factory's presence and the amount of mining that had been done in that area that people believed the waterfall's color was because of pollution from these activities.

== Yin-Yang Sea ==
The Golden waterfall runs off into the Shuinandong Bay and the sea there has two colors, the normal blue and the yellow from the waterfall's runoff. Because of this contrast of colors in the bay, the local people started to call it the Yin-Yang Sea. The inspiration for this name comes from the concept of duality and of two different sides becoming one whole.

== See also ==
- List of waterfalls
