= Shengping Theater =

Theater in Ruifang, New Taipei, Taiwan

- 昇平戲院
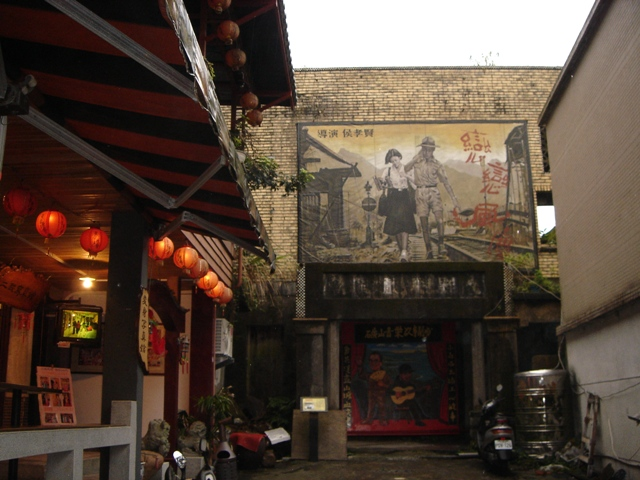
- Interactive map of Shengping Theater
- Former names: Shengping Stage
- Location: Ruifang, New Taipei, Taiwan
- Coordinates: 25°06′31.4″N 121°50′36.3″E
- Type: theater

Construction
- Opened: 2011

The Shengping Theater (traditional Chinese: 昇平戲院; simplified Chinese: 升平戏院; pinyin: Shēngpíng Xìyuàn) is a theater in Jiufen, Ruifang District, New Taipei, Taiwan.

== History ==
In 1916, the land where the theater stands today was donated by Yan Yun-nian. The Taihoku Prefecture government then raised fund to construct a theater. A simple theater was then constructed in the area which could accommodate 400 people. In 1927, the building collapsed and was rebuilt in 1934 as the Shengping Stage. After the handover of Taiwan from Japan to the Republic of China in 1945, the theater was renamed Shengping Theater. The building was reconstructed in 1961. The building was almost destroyed by the 1986 Pacific typhoon season and was subsequently closed in the same year. In 1994, the theater roof was damaged by typhoon. In 2009, the building was donated to Taipei County Government. The county government then designated the building as a historical monument on 28 June 2010. In October 2010, renovation work was carried out and completed in 2011. The theater was then reopened to the public.

== Architecture ==
The theater covers an area of 660 m^{2}. The wall was constructed using hollow bricks and its roofs is decorated with Chinese cypress. The building consists of two floors. The ground floor consists of six-seat style seating and the upper floor consists of U-shaped grandstand's wooden-chairs.

== Activities ==
The theater regularly showcases movies, Taiwanese operas etc.

== See also ==
- Cinema of Taiwan
