= Taiwan Oil Field Exhibition Hall =

Gallery in Gongguan, Miaoli County, Taiwan

- 台灣油礦陳列館
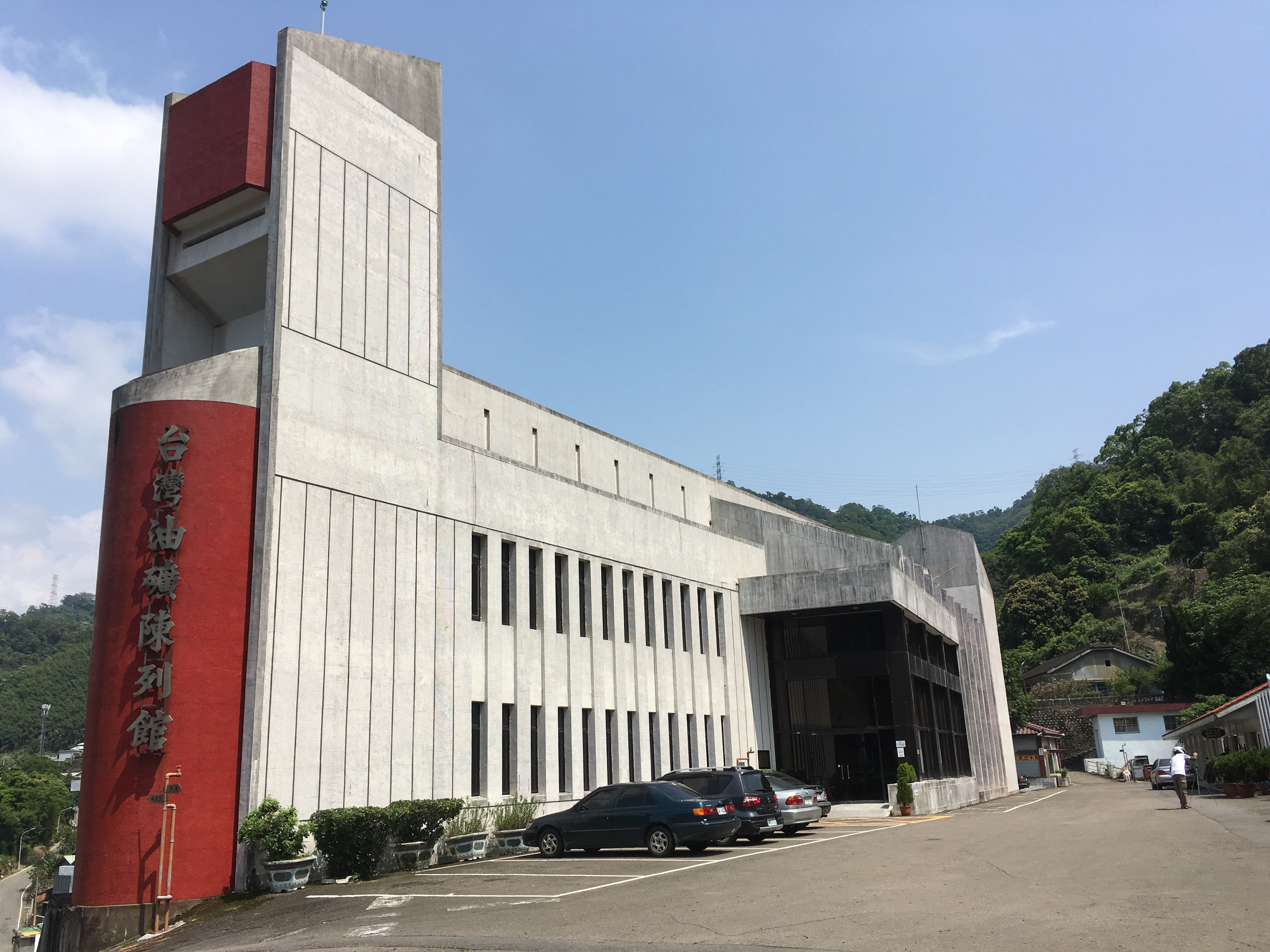
- Established: 1981
- Location: Gongguan, Miaoli County, Taiwan
- Coordinates: 24°27′37″N 120°51′21″E
- Type: gallery

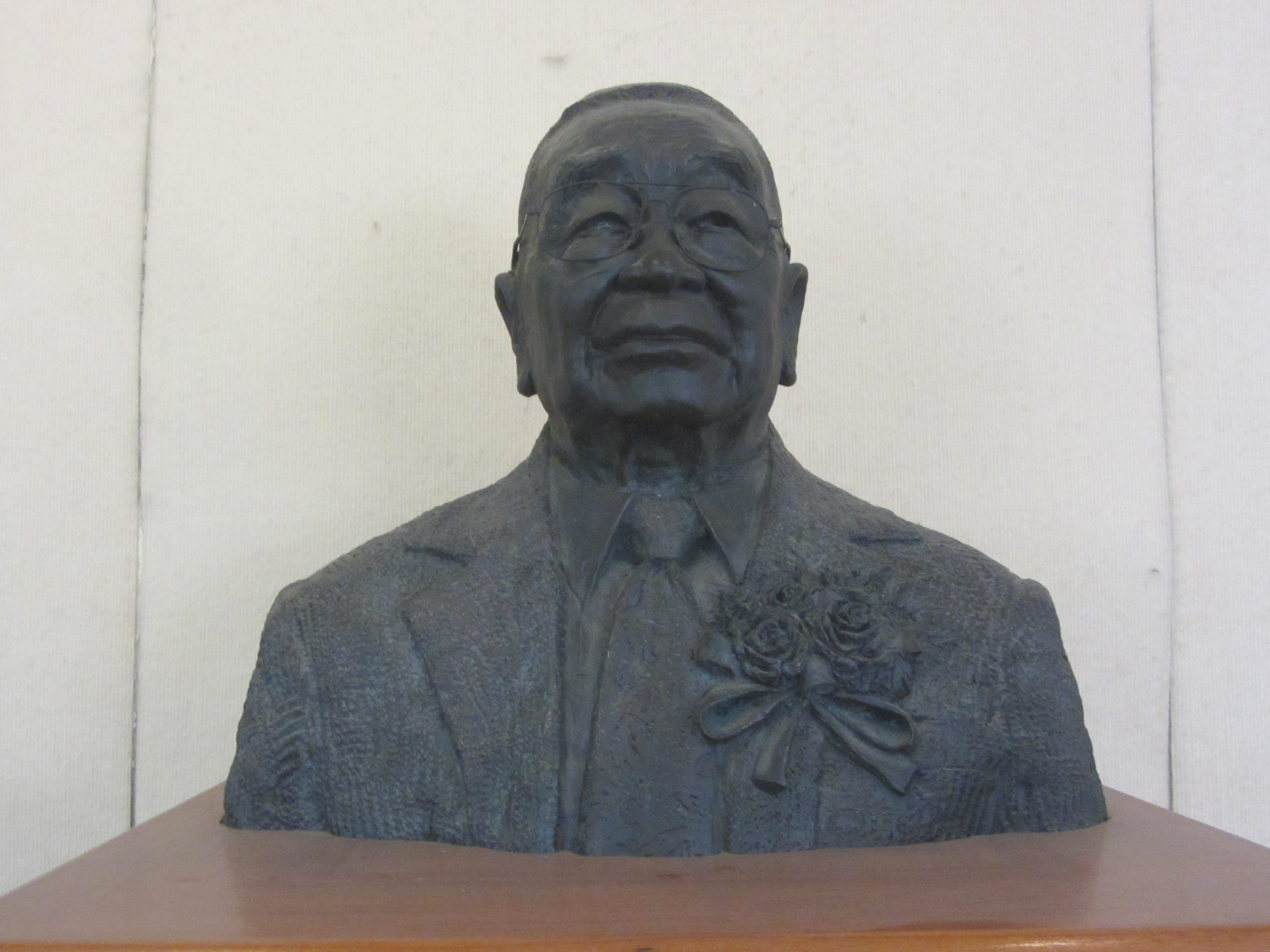
Bust of Chin Kai-ying

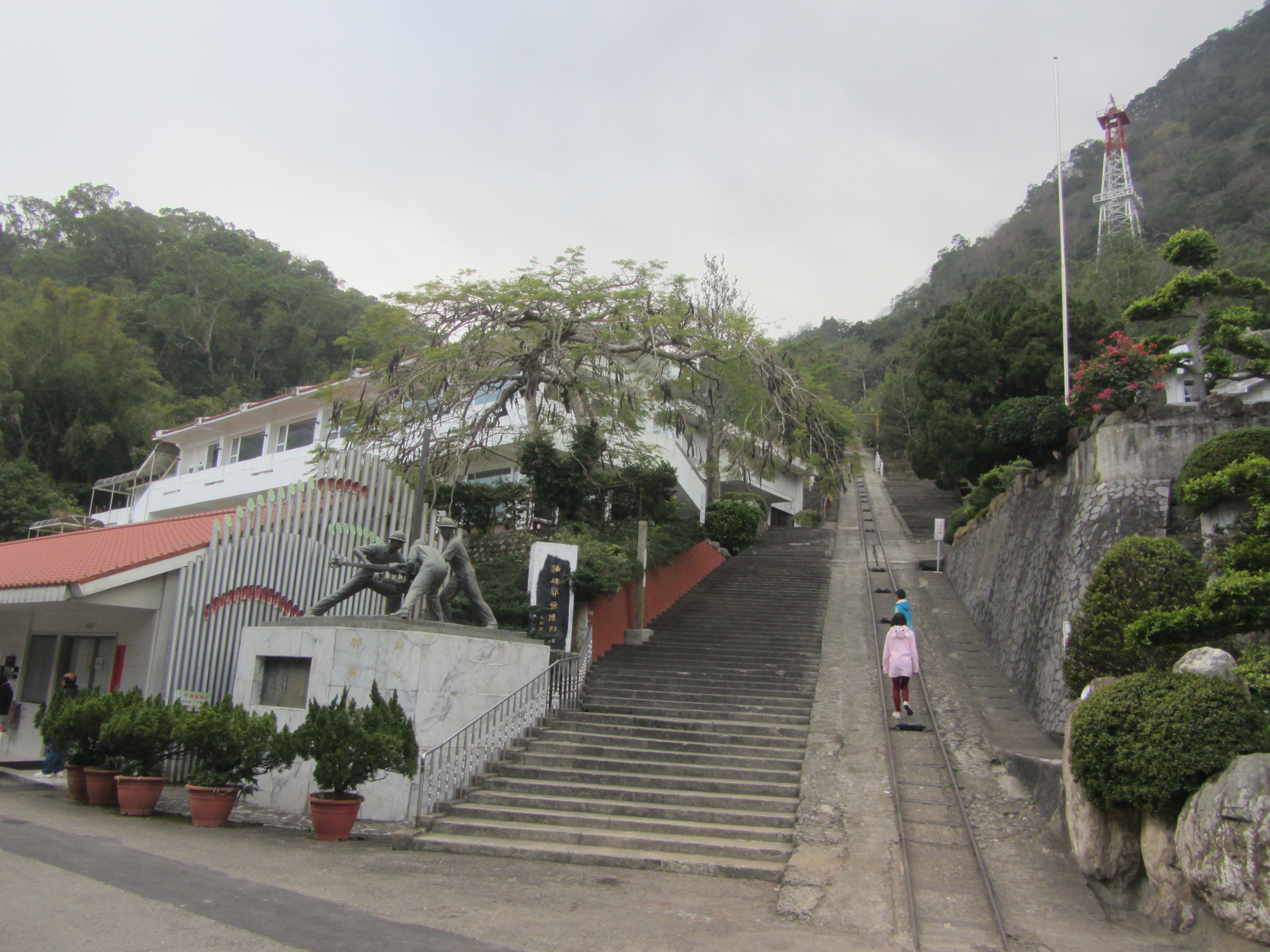
Chuhuangkeng

The Taiwan Oil Field Exhibition Hall or Taiwan Petroleum Exhibition Hall (traditional Chinese: 台灣油礦陳列館; simplified Chinese: 台湾油矿陈列馆; pinyin: Táiwān Yóukuàng Chénlièguǎn) is a museum about oil in Gongguan Township, Miaoli County, Taiwan.

== History ==
The museum was established in 1981 by CPC Corporation in the area where oil was first discovered in Taiwan.

== Architecture ==
The museum is housed in a two-story building. It is the largest building within the village it is located.

== Exhibition ==
The hall houses the exhibition pavilions on the development of petroleum industry in Taiwan, from literature recording excavation, drilling and natural gas work.

== See also ==
- List of museums in Taiwan
- Mining in Taiwan
