= Bitou Cape =

Cape in Ruifang, New Taipei, Taiwan

Bitou Cape 鼻頭角
- Cape
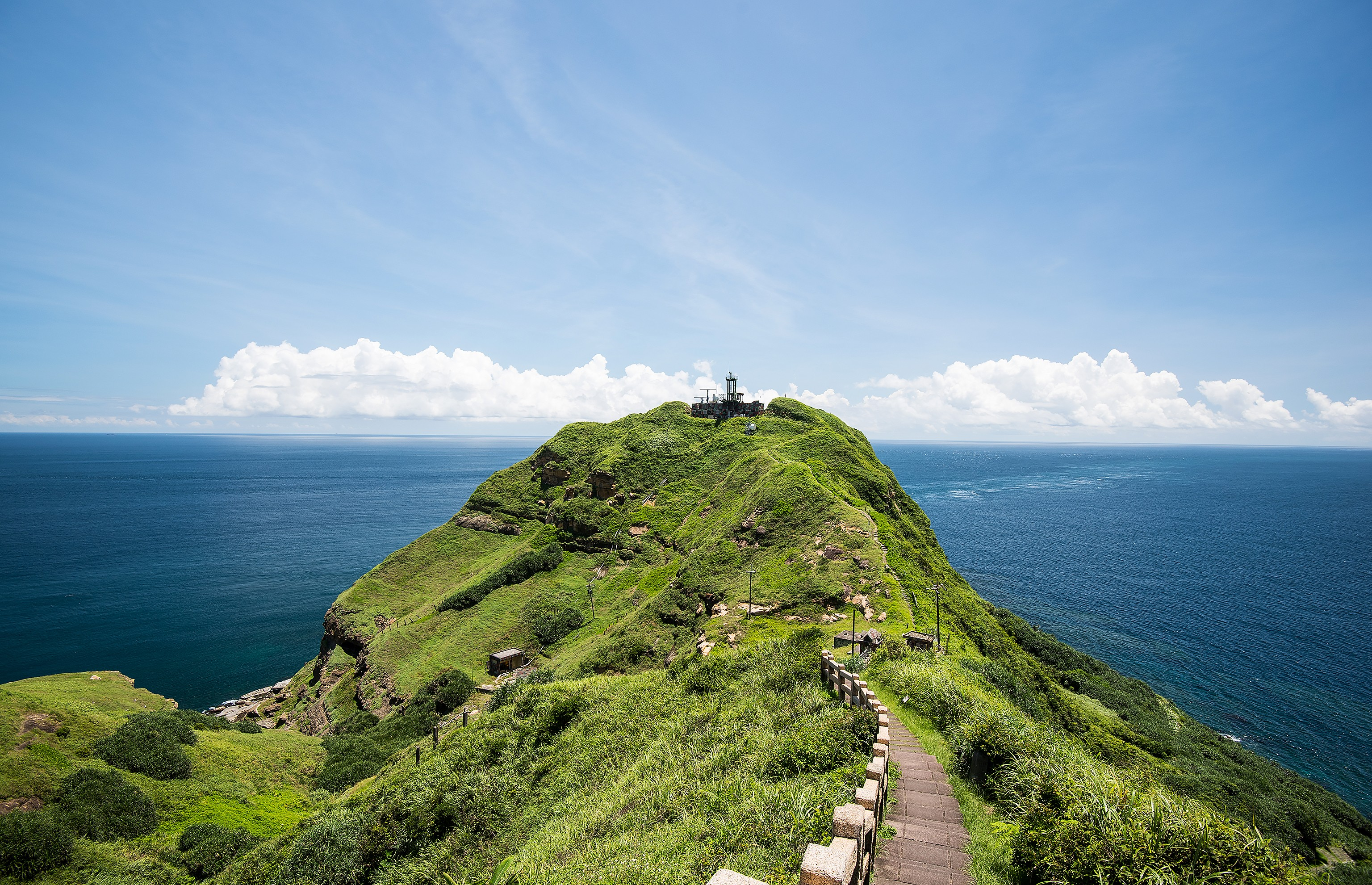

- Taiwan
- Coordinates: 25°07′41.6″N 121°55′23.3″E
- Location: Ruifang, New Taipei, Taiwan
- Geology: cape

The Bitou Cape (traditional Chinese: 鼻頭角; simplified Chinese: 鼻头角; pinyin: Bítóu Jiǎo) is a cape in Ruifang District, New Taipei, Taiwan.

== Name ==
The name Bitou means the tip of the nose in Chinese language.

== Geology ==
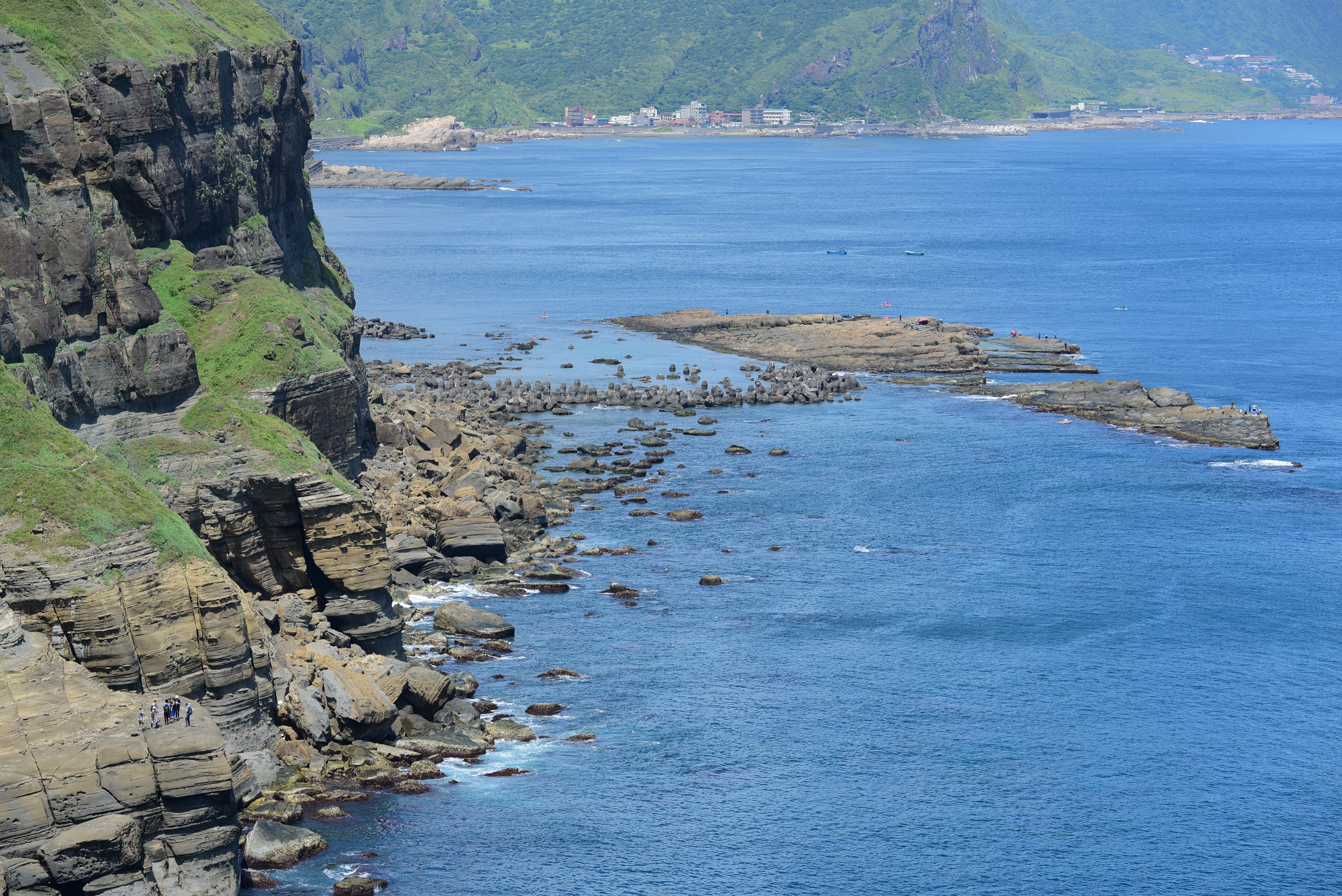

The cape is the northeasternmost cape of Taiwan. It is the sea-eroded type of land form, thus it includes several features such as sea cliffs, undercut bluffs and platforms.

== Architecture ==
The cape is equipped with a circular route of walking trail, which starts from Bitou Fishing Port and ends up at Bitou Elementary School. It also houses a military barrack and the Bitoujiao Lighthouse at the end of the cape.

== Transportation ==
The cape is accessible by bus from Taipei Main Station.

== See also ==
- Geology of Taiwan
