= Banping Lake Wetland Park =

Wetland in Zuoying, Kaohsiung, Taiwan

- 半屏湖濕地公園 (Chinese)
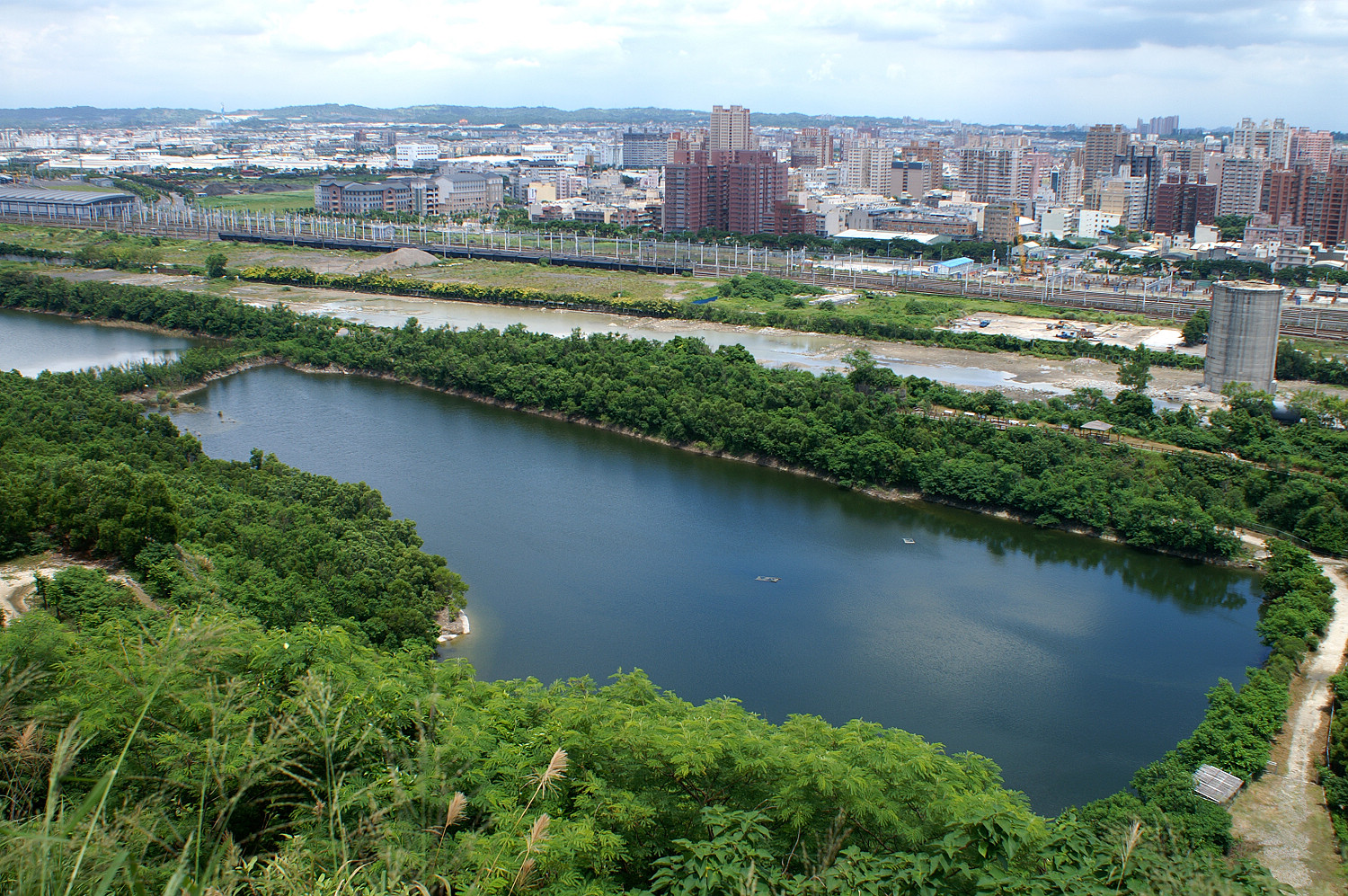

- Location within Kaohsiung
- Location: Zuoying, Kaohsiung, Taiwan
- Coordinates: 22°41′43.8″N 120°18′42.6″E
- Type: constructed wetland
- Surface area: 13 hectares (32 acres)

The Banping Lake Wetland Park (traditional Chinese: 半屏湖濕地公園; simplified Chinese: 半屏湖湿地公园; pinyin: Bànpínghú Shīdì Gōngyuán; Wade–Giles: Panp'inghu Shihti Kungyüan) is a constructed wetland in Zuoying District, Kaohsiung, Taiwan.

== History ==
The area around the park used to be a geological limestone mountain called Mount Banping. It used to be an important source of Taiwan's limestone ore needs. In 1997, the mining activities ceased to operate after 30 years of activity and the mining area began to recover to its original condition. Several years later, the Kaohsiung City Government carried out a conservation plan to protect the soil and water for the abandoned mine area. After years of restorative afforestation and rehabilitation, the mountain slowly regained its original beauty.

In 2004, the Kaohsiung Association of Hydraulic Engineers was commissioned by the Kaohsiung City government to assess the feasibility of converting the grit chamber area at the southern base of Banping Mountain, owned by Chien Tai Cement Company, into a wetland park. The result of the evaluation was positive. In 2005, the city government developed a nature park at the foot of Banping Mountain's northwestern side. At the southern base of the mountain, they also constructed five flood-detention grit chambers. Artificial wetlands were also created to serve as both grit-removal systems and flood-detention basins.

== Geology ==
The park spans over an area of 13 hectares. It features viewing platforms and bird-watching huts.

== Transportation ==
The wetland is accessible within walking distance north of Xinzuoying Station.

== See also ==
- Mining in Taiwan
- Gaomei Wetlands
