= Mining in Taiwan =

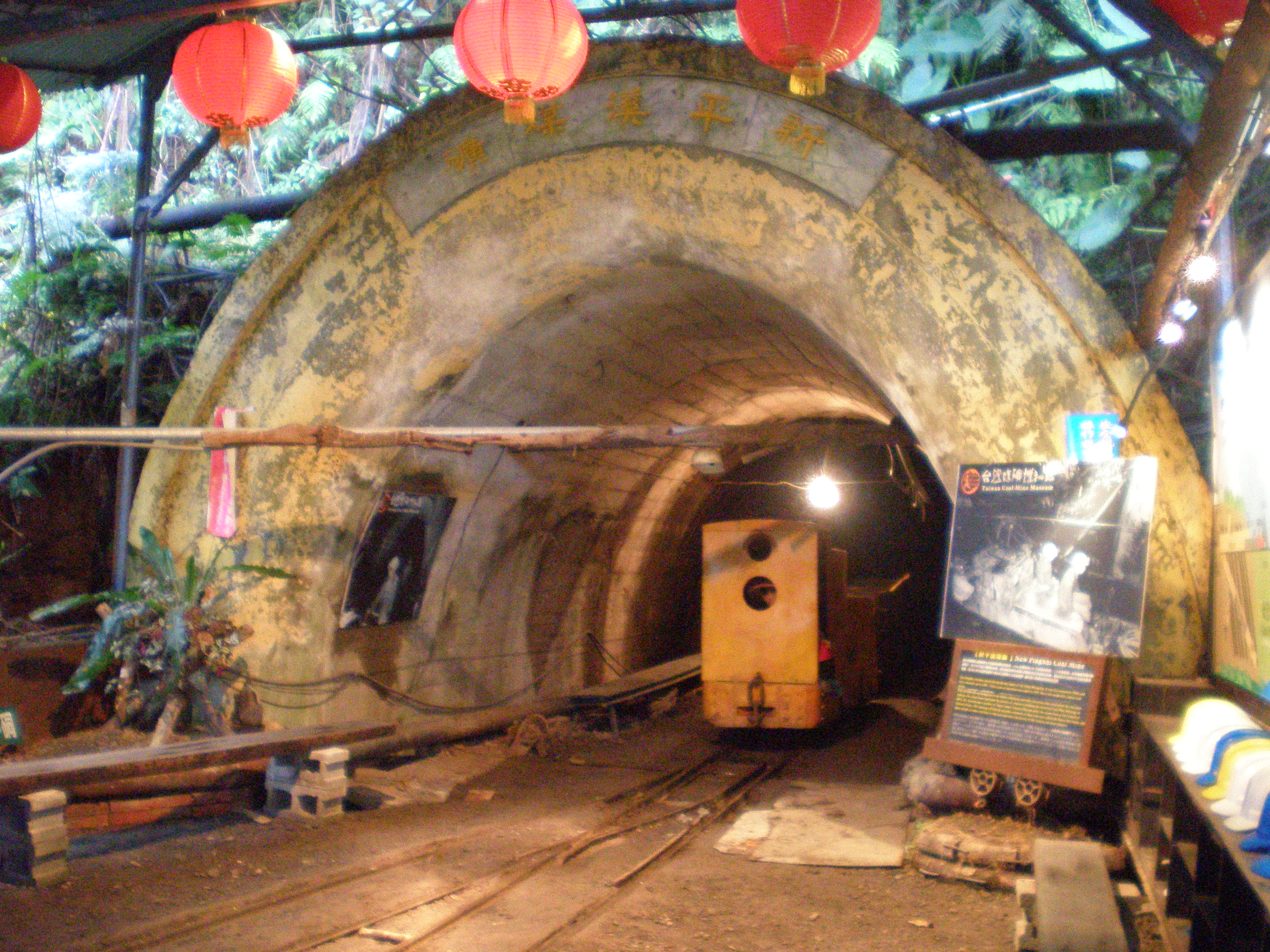
Taiwan Coal Mine Museum in Pingxi, New Taipei

Mining has been practiced in Taiwan for hundreds of years. Sulfur was an early important resource collected on the island. Coal mining expanded in the 19th century to keep up with demand from increased foreign trade. Heavy industry was further expanded under Japanese rule, but air raids towards the end of World War II decimated mining infrastructure, falling below 19th century production levels. Copper mining expanded in the mid-20th century, but ended in the 1980s following a global collapse in the price of copper.

Today, Taiwan produces cement, marble, gold, oil and natural gas. Mining activities in Taiwan are regulated by the Bureau of Mines of the Ministry of Economic Affairs.

== History of mining ==
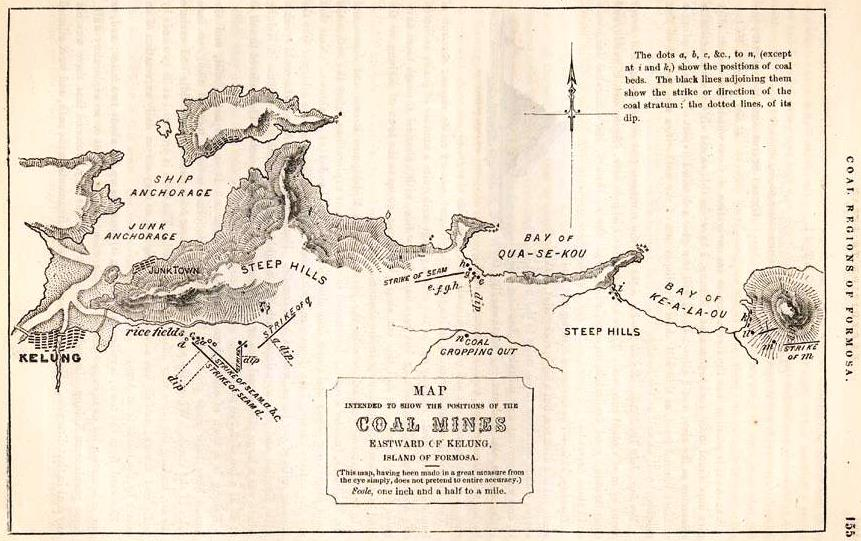
Coal mining map in Keelung in 1856

Pre-colonization the indigenous people of Taiwan traded sulfur from deposits around volcanic vents to Chinese merchants visiting from the continent.

Chinese mining and metallurgy followed the Hoklo, Hakka, and Han to Taiwan Island, particularly after the late Ming (16th & 17th centuries). Work was expanded under the Qing, but was limited by the occupation of the highlands by hostile native peoples.

Under the consent of the Fujian officials, Yu Yonghe travelled to Taiwan following the explosion of the Fuzhou gunpowder stores in 1696 to mine sulfur. Yu's voyage began at the coast to Xiamen, crossing the Taiwan Strait and coming to a halt in Penghu before arriving in Tainan. Yu then journeyed northward to Tamsui and Beitou where he bought amorphous sulfur from local Aborigines for the making of pure sulfur. The expedition lasted ten months. This trip became the basis of one of the most important works about early Qing-era Taiwan, Small Sea Travel Diaries (裨海紀遊).

As late as 1880, the only resources known to exist in economical quantities and locations were coal, sulphur, and petroleum, all in the volcanic northeastern third of the island. Mining was progressively developed by both the government and private sectors.

After "Taiwan" (i.e. Tainan) and "Taashwi" (i.e. Tamsui) were opened to foreign commerce by the 1858 Treaties of Tianjin, foreign ships required those ports to maintain supplies of coal. This was provided from fields near Keelung and Tamsui, whose highly bituminous coal was fast-burning but nonetheless used by the warships of the Fuzhou Arsenal. The high demand led to rampant smuggling and theft, to the point where the Qing government temporarily banned the trade to rein in its ill effects. The Qing introduced modern coal mining to Taiwan in 1877, when they retained the British engineer Tyzack to open a 91 m (300 ft) shaft with modern machinery.

Taiwan's heavy industry was developed by Japan both before and during the Second World War, but US bombing—particularly after the Taiwan Air Battle in October 1944 gave the Americans air supremacy—devastated mining production. Although overall industry had declined only 33% from 1937 levels by the war's end, coal production had fallen from 200,000 metric tons (197,000 long tons; 220,000 short tons) to 15,000 metric tons (14,800 long tons; 16,500 short tons), lower than the amount produced in the mid-1870s.

Women were significant participants in the mining industry during the Japanese colonial period. The Empire of Japan was not a party to the Underground Work (Women) Convention, 1935. The Republic of China which took over in 1945 was a party to the convention but women continued to work in Taiwanese mines until 1963 when Soong Mei-ling intervened following an accident which killed multiple married couples.

Coal mining largely ended by the 1990s due to a combination of repeated serious accidents and the low price of imported coal.

== Economy ==
As of 2013, mineral products accounted for 10% of Taiwan export value. The sector also employs 2,758 workforce.

== Types of mining ==
=== Cement ===
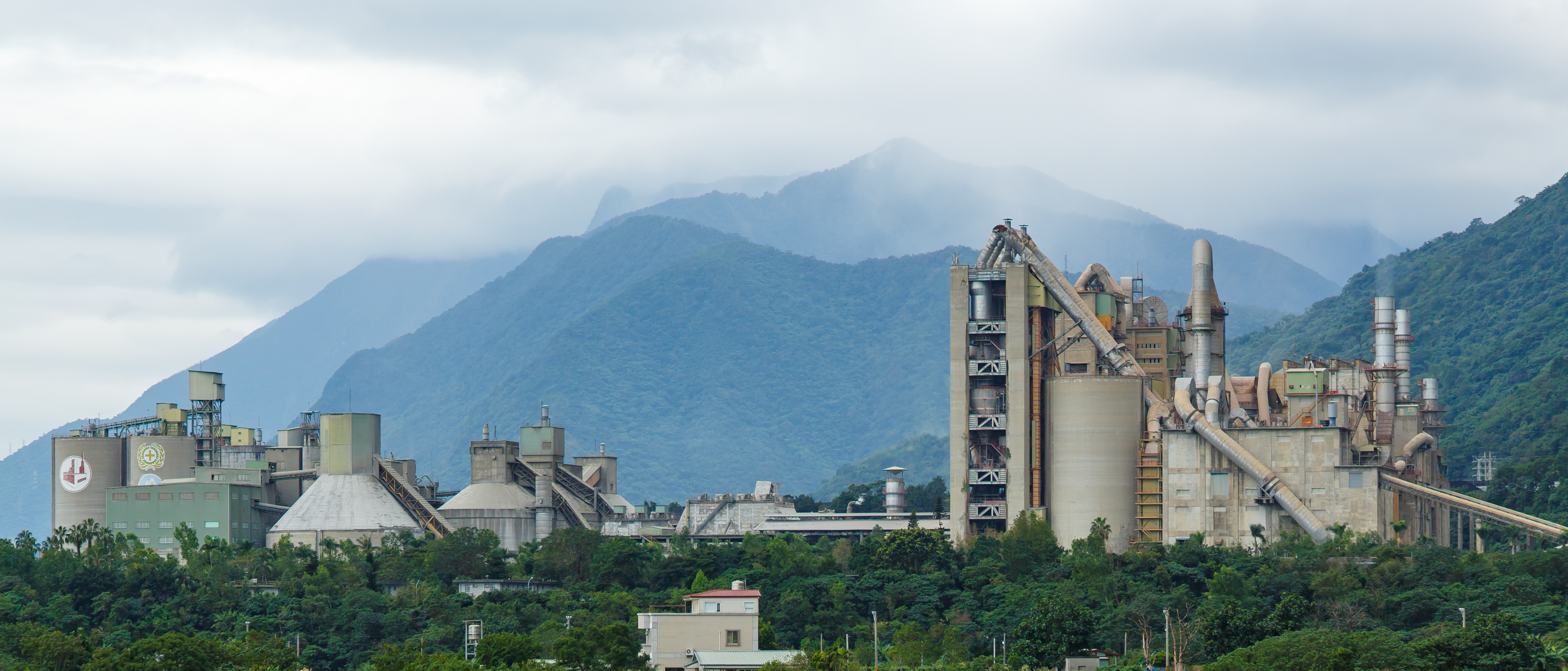
Cement plant in Hualien County

Around 80% of Taiwan's cement are mined and produced in Eastern Taiwan. In 2013, the output capacity was 26 million tonnes per year. In that year, Taiwan produced 16 Mt of cement and consumed 12 Mt. Cement is exported to Ghana, Malaysia, Indonesia, Mauritius and Australia. Cement mining in Taiwan is mostly done by Taiwan Cement or Asia Cement Corporation in which its plant in Hualien County contributes to nearly 29% of Taiwan's cement production.

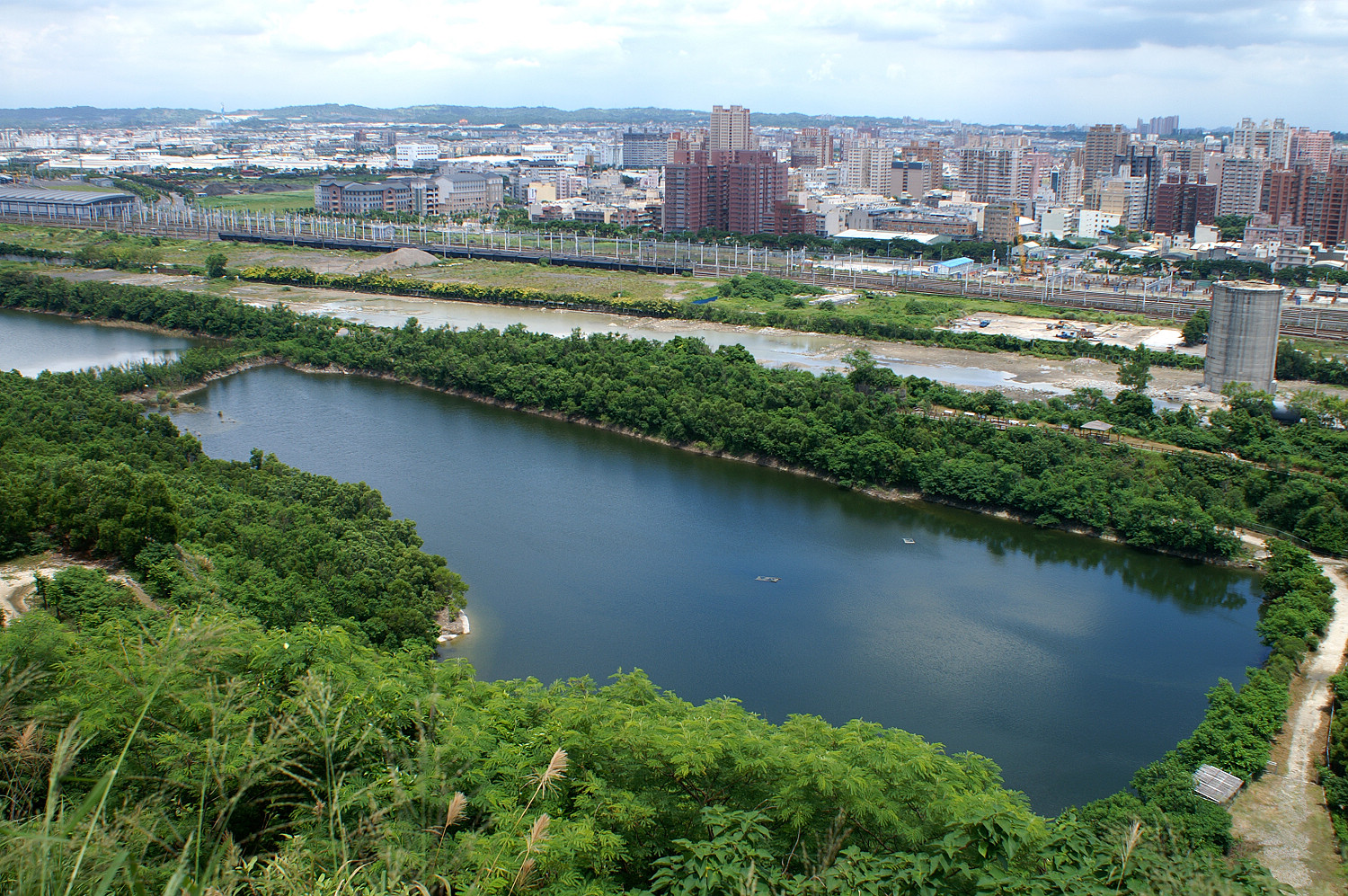
Former limestone mining site in Zuoying, Kaohsiung

Limestone mining was done in Zuoying District, Kaohsiung in an area what used to be a part of Mount Banping. In 1997, the mining activities ceased to operate. The abandoned site has now been turned into the Banping Lake Wetland Park for tourism by the Kaohsiung City Government.

=== Coal ===
Coal is distributed mainly in northern Taiwan. All of the commercial coal deposits occurred in three Miocene coal-bearing formations, which are the Upper, the Middle and the Lower Coal Measures. The Middle Coal Measures was the most important with its wide distribution, great number of coal beds and extensive potential reserves. Taiwan has coal reserves estimated to be 100-180 Mt. However, coal output had been small, amounting to 6,948 metric tonnes per month from 4 pits before it ceased production effectively in 2000. The abandoned coal mine in Pingxi District, New Taipei has now been turned into the Taiwan Coal Mine Museum, while the one in Houtong has been turned into Houtong Cat Village. There are 394 retired coal mines in Taiwan.

=== Copper ===
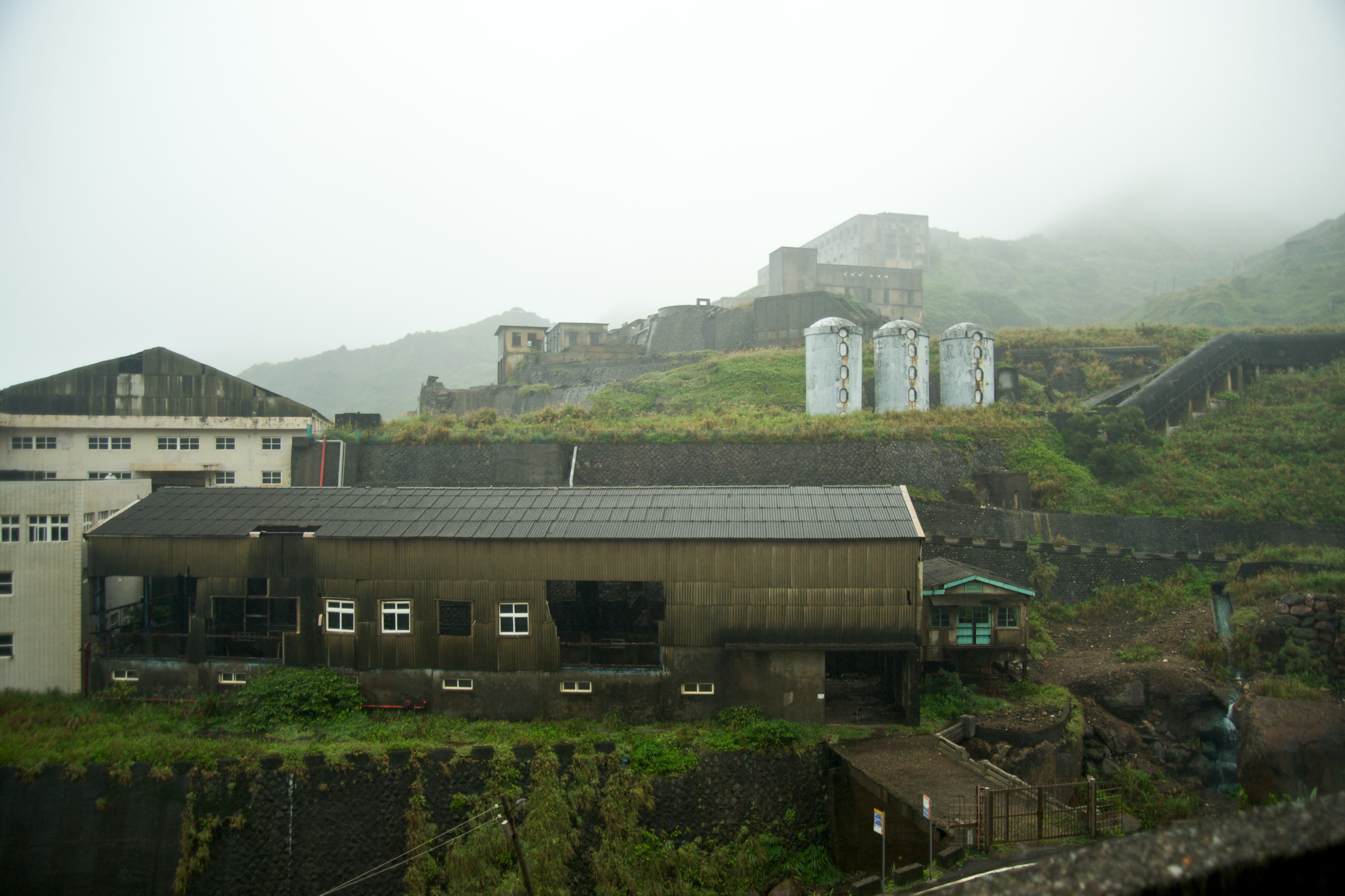
Abandoned mine facility in Jinguashi, Ruifang, New Taipei

Copper mining, as well as gold, used to take place in Jinguashi town in Ruifang District, New Taipei. In 1904, arsenic-copper sulfate mineral enargite was found at the No. 3 Mine in the area when miners dug deeper, increasing the amount of copper minerals discovered. From that moment, the focus of the mining in the area shifted from gold and silver to gold, silver, and copper. After the liberation of Taiwan in 1945, the state-run Taiwan Gold and Copper Mining Bureau was established in 1946 and renamed to Taiwan Metals Mining Company in 1955. As copper production gradually increased over the years, Jinguashi mining area are good and maintained excellent operating performance. However, after 1973, the gold and copper output began to decline. In order to increase the production, the company started large-scale open-pit mining in 1978 and shifted its focus to mineral refining and processing. To boost their mineral processing capabilities, the company took out bank loans in 1981 to build the Lile Copper Refinery in the area located at the Golden Waterfall today. Because of a collapse in the world copper price few years later, the company was unable to repay its loans and went out of business in 1987. The Taiwan Sugar Corporation assumed ownership of the land in Jinguashi and the mining in that area came to an end.

=== Gold ===
Taiwan has four gold-bearing deposits with metal content estimated at 100 tonnes. Three of the deposits are concentrated in the central mountain range, while the fourth one is at Pingfeng Mountain in the north. Jinguashi Mine is one of the biggest gold deposit, located in Ruifang District, New Taipei. The Gold Ecological Park was established within the area which houses the Gold Museum. Quartz was often found at the same rate as gold.

=== Oil and gas ===
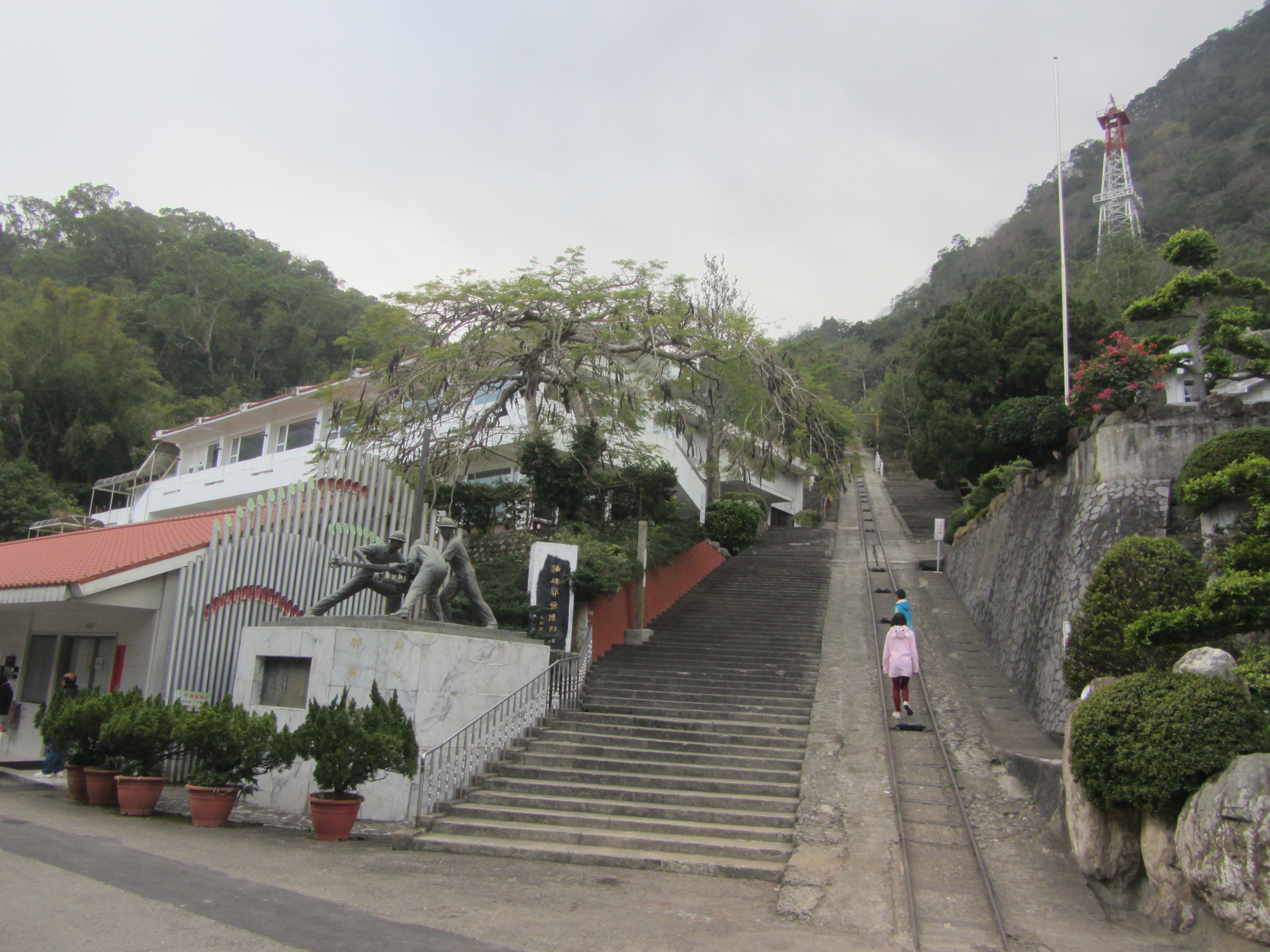
Chuhuangkeng former oilfield in Gongguan, Miaoli County

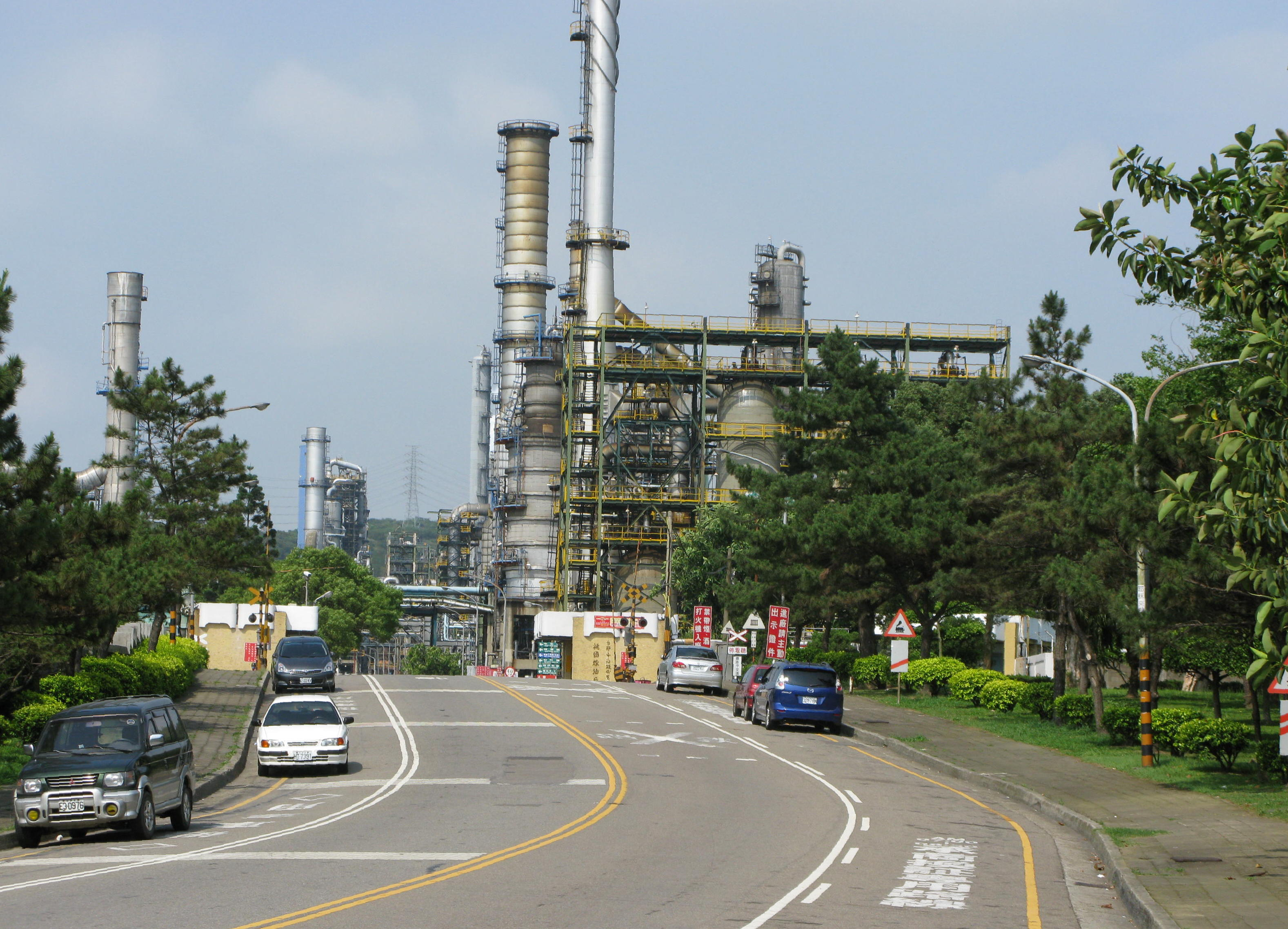
CPC oil refinery in Guishan District, Taoyuan City

Oil was firstly discovered in Taiwan in Gongguan Township, Miaoli County at the Chuhuangkeng oilfield. Oil has been drilled since the Qing Dynasty rule of Taiwan in 1877. It was then done by the more advanced development stage by the Japanese when they drilled around 98 oil wells. The original site of the first oil well in Taiwan has now turned into the Taiwan Oil Field Exhibition Hall. Oil exploration in Taiwan is controlled by the CPC Corporation. Deep drilling in Taiwan began in 1959 when the CPC drilled to a depth up to 4,063 meters which they brought out more than 110,000 m^{3} of natural gas and 10,000 liters condensate daily. Offshore drilling began in 1973 when their rig went down 3,661 meters under the ocean off the coast of Hsinchu County with no result. In January 2013, Taiwan had 2 million barrels of proven oil reserves. In 2012, Taiwan produced 22,000 barrels/day of oil. In 2007, the capacity of Taiwan oil refinery was 1,197,000 barrels/day due to its large refinery sectors. In 2012, Taiwan planned to explore oil offshore of Taiping Island in Cijin District, Kaohsiung City.

Taiwan produces a small amount of natural gas. Gas exploration in Taiwan is also controlled by the CPC Corporation. It also cooperates with China National Offshore Oil Corporation in exploring natural gas in the Taiwan Strait. In 2004, natural reserved was discovered in Guantian Township, Tainan County. In July 2010, the CPC discovered natural gas reserves in Gongguan Township, Miaoli County which was estimated to have a production capacity of at least 1 billion m^{3}. In March 2013, a Taiwanese oceanic research team discovered gas hydrate deposits in water south of Pratas Island, Cijin District, Kaohsiung City in the South China Sea through reflection seismology and sub-bottom profiling data.

=== Marble ===
Taiwan has some of the largest marble reserves in the world, they were first exploited during the Japanese colonial period for construction and as feedstock in the production of cement, fertilizer, carbide, paper, and sugar. Wide scale exploitation followed the opening of the Keelung-Suao railway in 1923. With the completion of the Suao-Hualien highway in 1931 the market expanded to Taipei. The industry collapsed during the last years of World War Two. The KMT government supported the redevelopment of the Taiwanese marble industry with the Vocational Assistance Commission for Retired Servicemen establishing both quarries and workshops for unemployed military retirees. Finished product exports in early years relied on low local wages to be competitive in the international market; in the 1960s an Italian marble ashtray cost $30 on the American market, while a comparable Taiwanese product would cost $4 in America and $2 in Taiwan. Significant investments were made in improving the quality of final products and the skills of the craftsmen. Hualien County is the center of the Taiwanese marble industry and is particularly known for its production of green serpentine and white marble.

== Energy usage ==
In 2014 the mining sector consumed a total of 474.4 GWh of electricity.

== Tourism ==
Sites for mining-related tourism in Taiwan include:

- Banping Lake Wetland Park
- Houtong Coal Mine Ecological Park
- Jingtong Coal Memorial Park
- Jingtong Mining Industry Museum
- New Taipei City Gold Museum
- Taiwan Coal Mine Museum
- Taiwan Oil Field Exhibition Hall

== See also ==
- Economy of Taiwan
- Energy in Taiwan
