= Mount Banping =

Mountain in Nanzi, Kaohsiung, Taiwan

- 半屏山
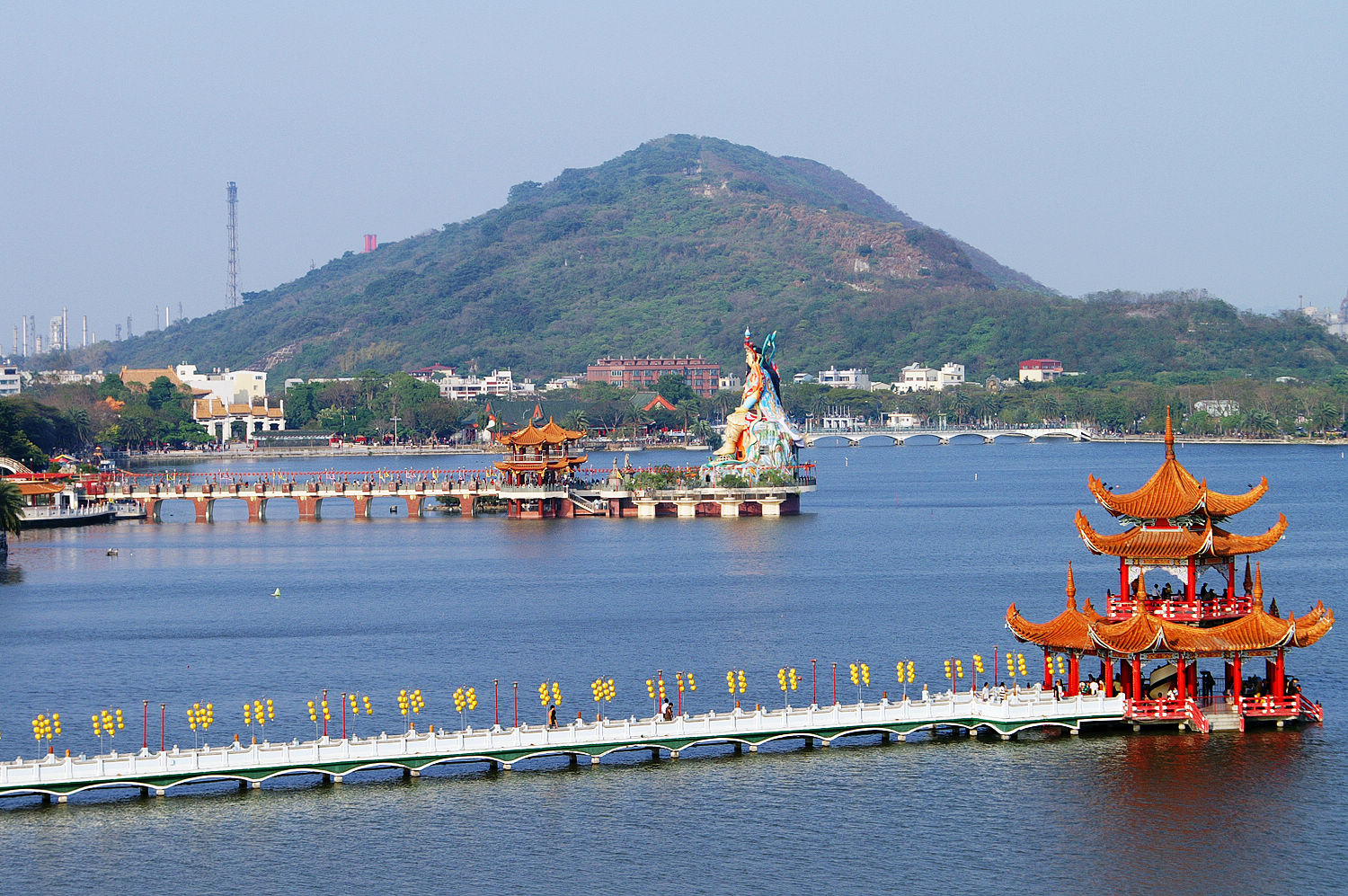

Highest point
- Elevation: 220 m (720 ft)
- Coordinates: 22°41′56.3″N 120°18′40.1″E

Geography
- Location: Nanzih, Kaohsiung, Taiwan

Mount Banping (Chinese: 半屏山; pinyin: Bànpíng Shān) is a mountain in Nanzih District, Kaohsiung, Taiwan.

== Name ==
The name Banping means half screen, named so because of the mountain steep side resembles a painted screen.

== History ==
During the Qing Dynasty rule of Taiwan, the mountain was the site of the most important limestone quarry in Taiwan. After the quarry was closed in 1997, the mountain was turned into a nature park. Vegetation is used for its slope protection and the old cement plant's grit removal pond was transformed into Banping Lake Wetland Park in the neighboring Zuoying District.

== Attractions ==
Visitors can hike the mountain via its wooden walkway to enjoy the panoramic views of Kaohsiung from the top of the mountain, which includes Lotus Pond, Zuoying District, Port of Zuoying, Niaosong District and Yancheng District.

== Transportation ==
The mountain is accessible within walking distance north of Xinzuoying Station.

== See also ==
- List of tourist attractions in Taiwan
- List of mountains in Taiwan
