= Ruifang District =

District in New Taipei, Taiwan

Ruifang 瑞芳區 Rueifang, Juifang, Zuihō
- District
- Ruifang District
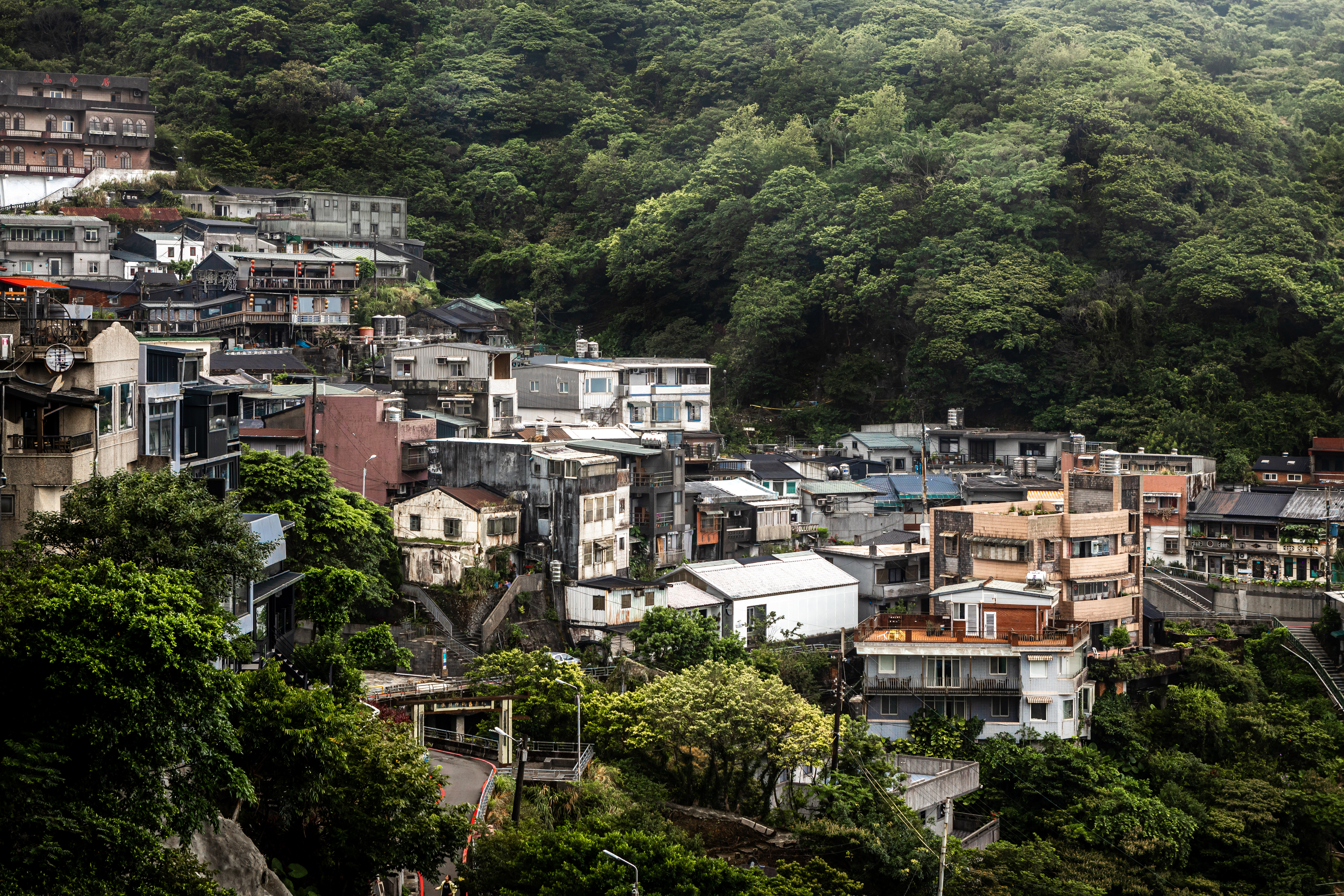
- Village of Jiufen in August 2023

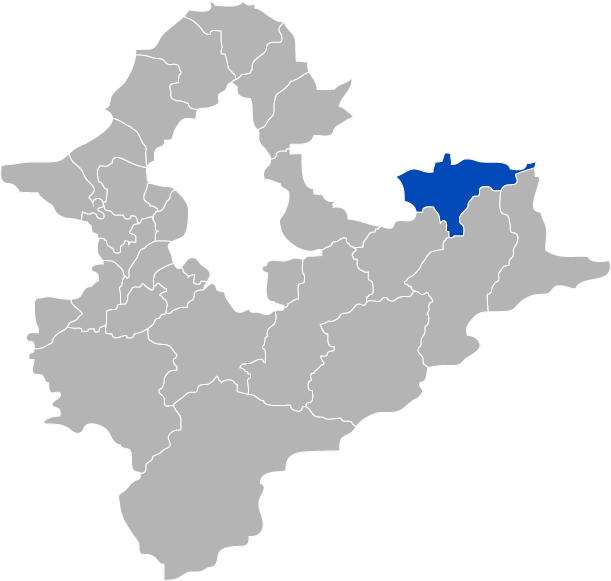
- Ruifang District in New Taipei City
- Coordinates: 25°07′N 121°48′E
- Country: Republic of China (Taiwan)
- Special municipality: New Taipei City
- Urban villages: 34

Government
  - Leader (區長): Wang Kun-Nan (王坤南)

Area
  - Total: 70.73 km^{2} (27.31 sq mi)

Population (February 2023)
  - Total: 37,607
- Time zone: UTC+8 (National Standard Time)
- Postal code: 224
- Website: www.ruifang.ntpc.gov.tw (in Chinese)

Ruifang
- Traditional Chinese: 瑞芳
- Postal: Juifang
Transcriptions
Standard Mandarin
- Hanyu Pinyin: Ruìfāng
- Wade–Giles: Jui^{4}-fang^{1}
- Tongyong Pinyin: Rueìfang
Hakka
- Romanization: Lui-fông
Southern Min
- Hokkien POJ: Sūi-hong

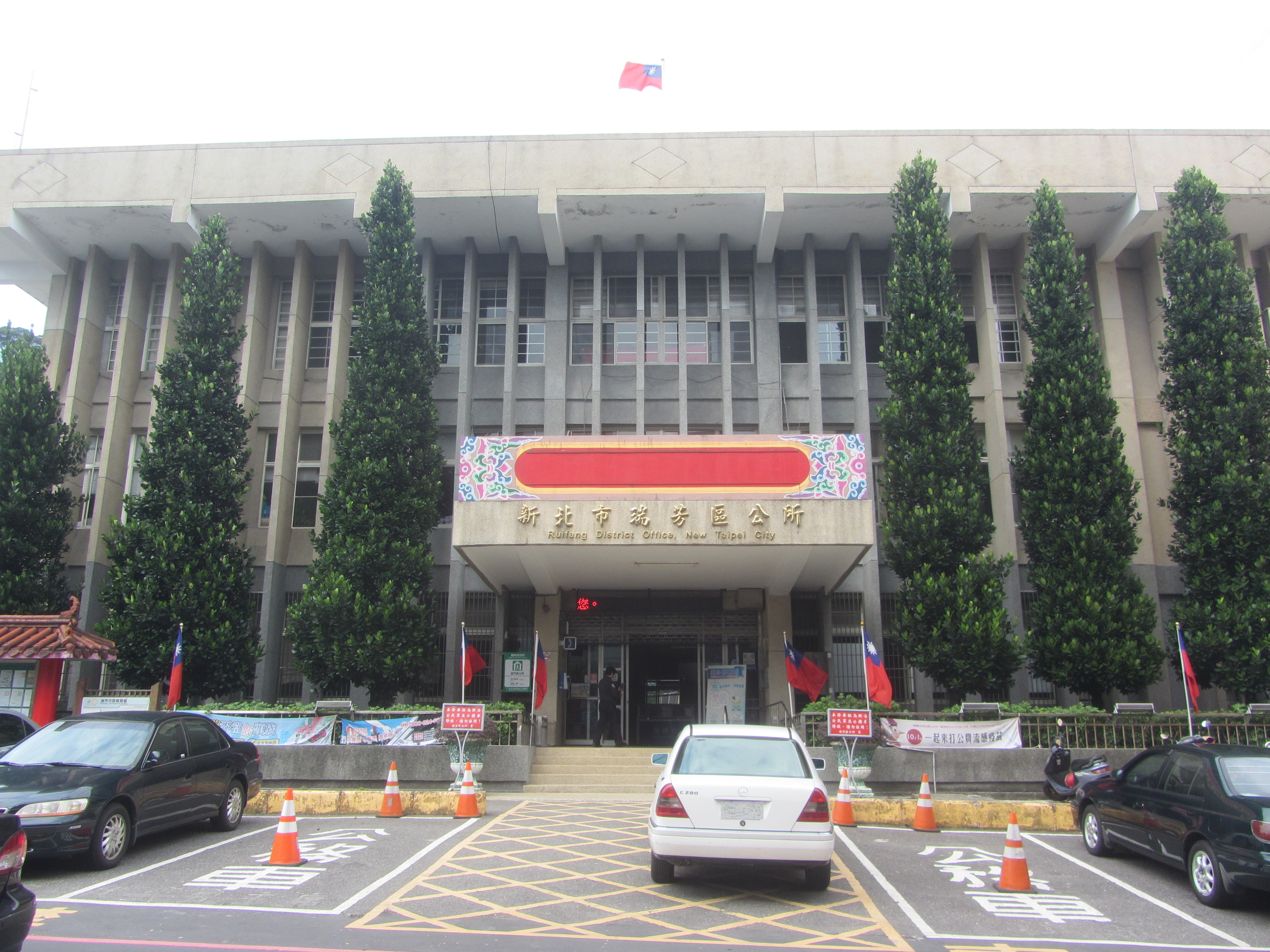
Ruifang District office

Ruifang District (Chinese: 瑞芳區; Hanyu Pinyin: Ruìfāng Qū; Tongyong Pinyin: Rueìfang Cyu; Pe̍h-ōe-jī: Sūi-hong-khu) is a suburban district in eastern New Taipei City, Taiwan.

== History ==
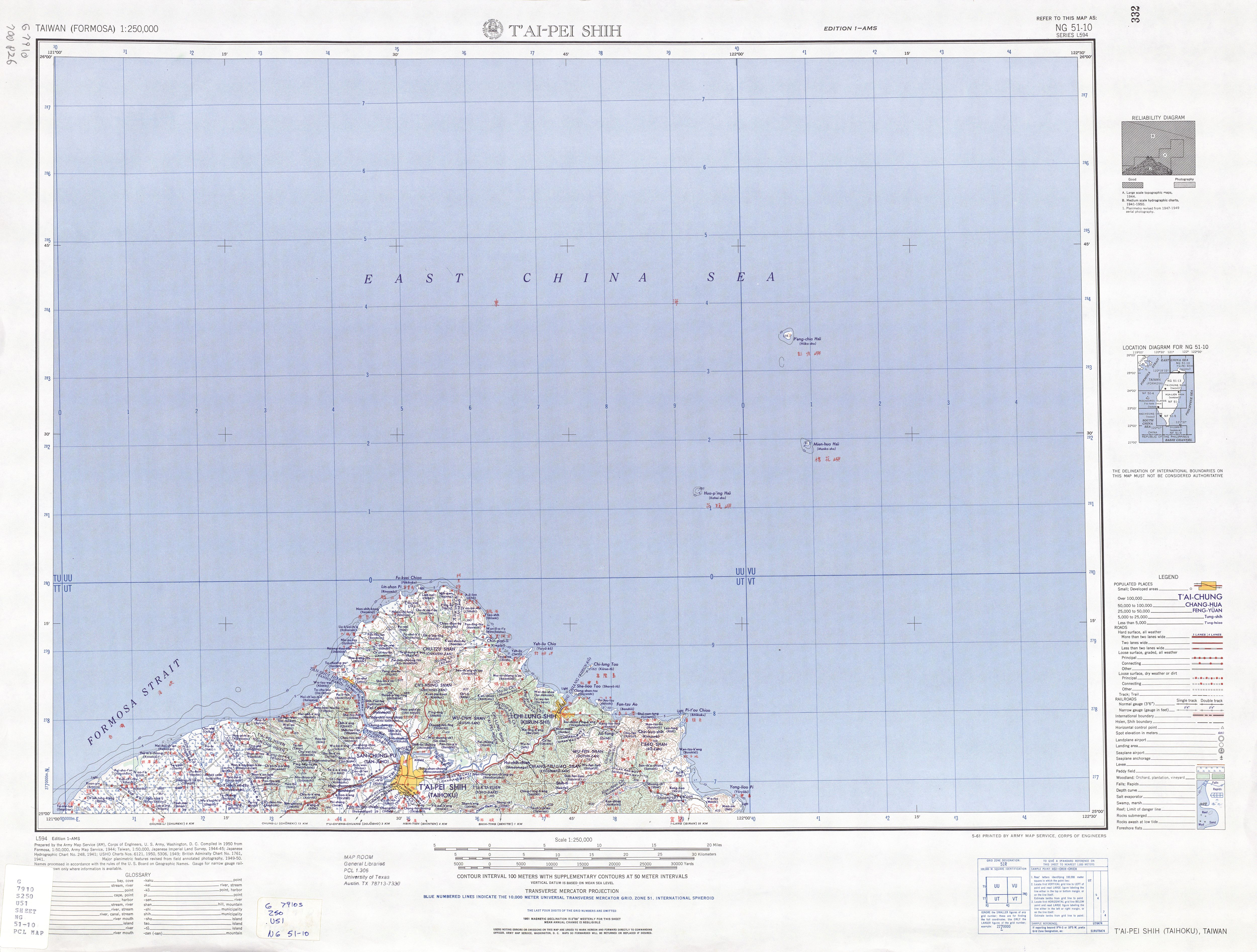
Map including Ruifang (labeled as Jui-fang (Zuihō) 瑞芳) (1950)

During Japanese rule, Ruifang was called Zuihō Town (瑞芳街), and was administered as part of Kīrun District (基隆郡) of Taihoku Prefecture. Mining was an important industry in Ruifang (then known as Sui-hong) in the early 20th century. Gold was mined in Kyūfun and Kinkaseki while coal was mined in Kau-tong (猴硐; Houtong).

After the handover of Taiwan from Japan to the Republic of China in 1945, Ruifang was organized as an urban township of Taipei County. The mining sites became popular tourist destinations after 1990. On 25 December 2010, Taipei County was upgraded into a municipality named New Taipei City and Ruifang became a district of the municipality. In March 2012, it was named one of the Top 10 Small Tourist Towns by the Tourism Bureau.

== Administrative divisions ==
There are thirty-four urban villages in the district which are divided between four election districts:

- Election District One
  - Longtan (龍潭里), Longxing (龍興里), Longzhen (龍鎮里), Longan (龍安里), Longshan (龍山里), Longchuan (龍川里), Zhaofeng (爪峰里), Xinfeng (新峰里), Tunghe (東和里), Ganping (柑坪里), Houtong (猴硐里), Guangfu (光復里), Gongqiao (弓橋里), Shuoren (碩仁里)
- Election District Two
  - Jiqing (吉慶里), Jian (吉安里), Shangtian (上天里), Jieyu (傑魚里)
- Election District Three
  - Fuzhu (福住里), Chongwen (崇文里), Jishan (基山里), Songde (頌德里), Yongqing (永慶里), Xinshan (新山里), Tongshan (銅山里), Shishan (石山里), Guashan (瓜山里)
- Election District Four
  - Bitou (鼻頭里), Lianxin (濂新里), Liandong (濂洞里), Nanya (南雅里), Haibin (海濱里), Ruibin (瑞濱里), Shenao (深澳里)

== Education ==
- New Taipei Municipal Jui-Fang Industrial High School

== Tourist attractions ==
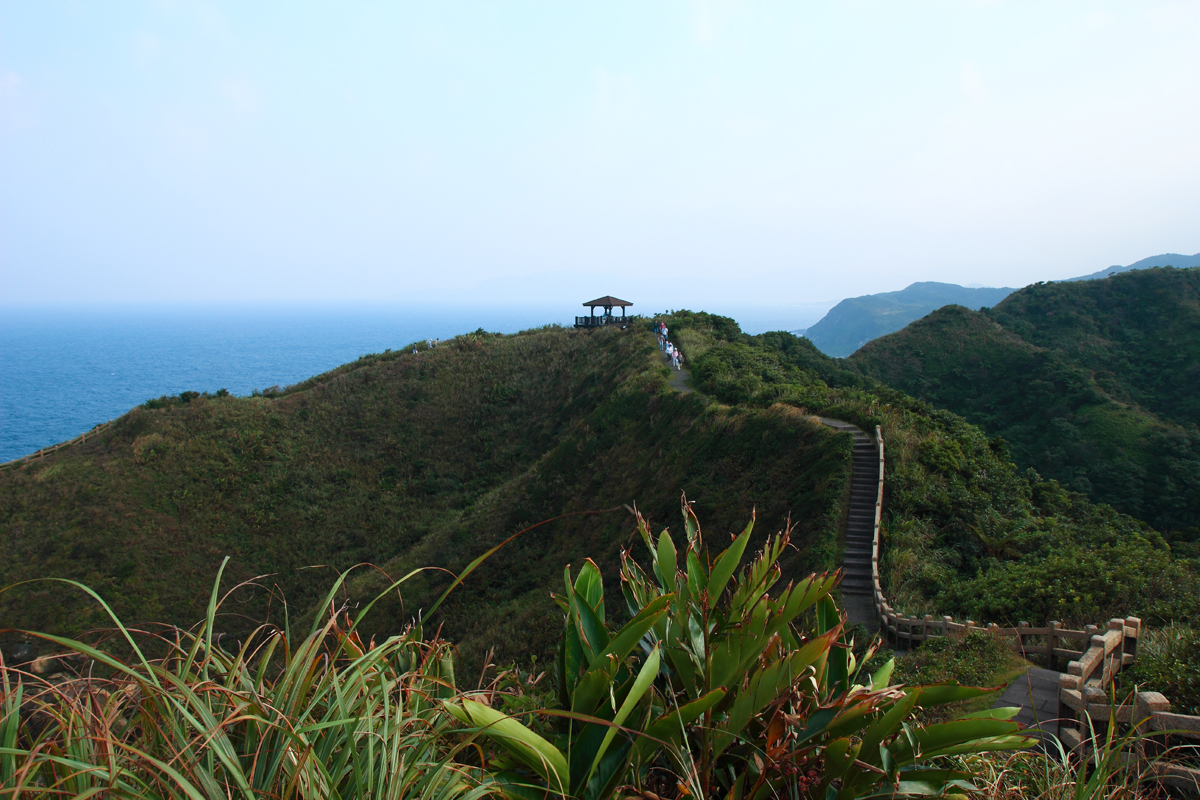
Bitou Cape Trail

- Bitou Cape
- Bitoujiao Lighthouse
- Golden Waterfall
- Houtong Cat Village
- Houtong Coal Mine Ecological Park
- Jinguashi
- Jiufen (Shengping Theater, Taiyang Gold Mine Office)
- Jiufen Gold Mine Museum
- Jiufen Kite Museum
- New Taipei City Gold Museum
- Remains of the 13 Levels
- Shen'ao Fishing Port
- Yin Yang Sea

== Transportation ==
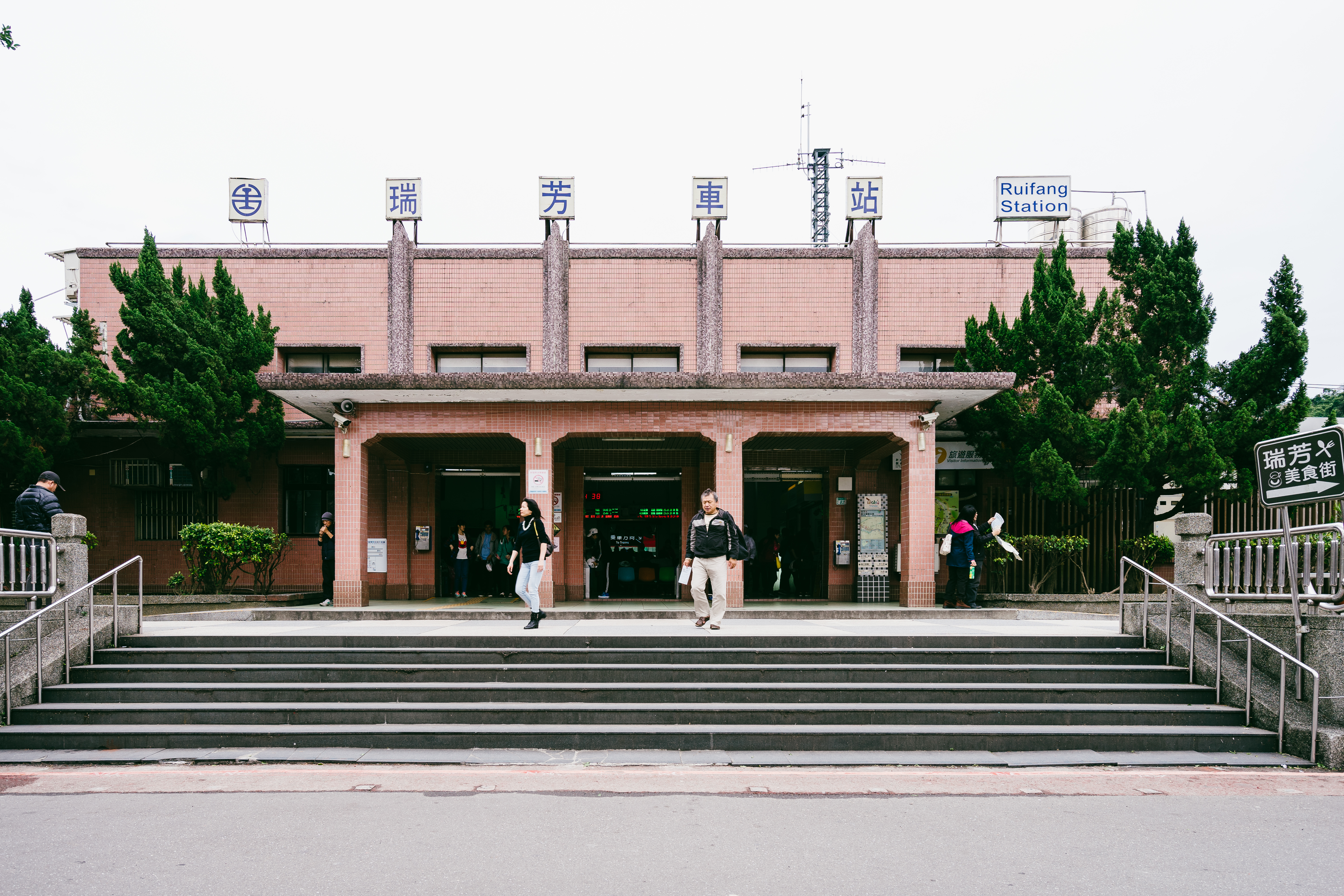
Ruifang Rail Station

Ruifang is served by the Yilan Line of Taiwan Railway. There are four stations in Ruifang Township, which are Ruifang Station, Houtong Station, Sijiaoting Station and Sandiaoling Station.

Provincial Highway 62 passes Ruifang and provides a convenient connection to Keelung City.

== Notable natives ==
- Gau Ming-ho, mountaineer
- Wu Nien-jen, scriptwriter, director and author

== See also ==
- New Taipei City
