= Shifen =

Shifen may refer to:

- Shifen Waterfall, Pingxi District, New Taipei City, Taiwan
- Shifen railway station, Pingxi District, New Taipei City, Taiwan
- Sun Shifen (1893–1995), former name of Sun Yueqi, industrialist and politician in Republic of China and later People's Republic of China

== See also ==
- Shifeng (disambiguation)
