= Wanggu railway station =

Railway station located in New Taipei City, Taiwan

Wanggu Station 望古車站
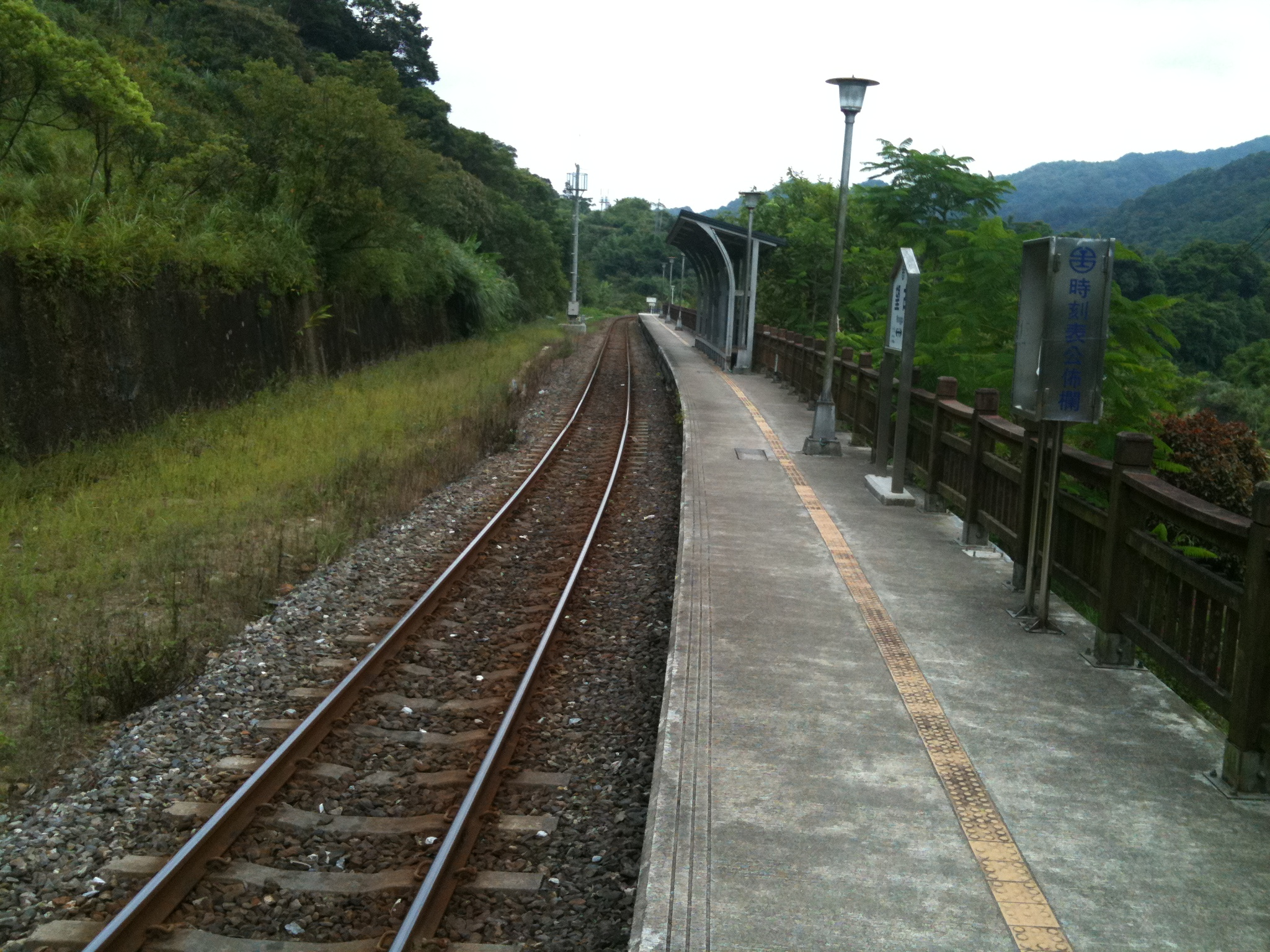
- Station platform

Chinese name
- Traditional Chinese: 望古車站
Transcriptions
Standard Mandarin
- Hanyu Pinyin: Wànggǔ Chēzhàn
- Bopomofo: ㄨㄤˋ ㄍㄨˇ ㄔㄜ ㄓㄢˋ

General information
- Location: Pingxi, New Taipei, Taiwan
- Coordinates: 25°02′04.6″N 121°45′49.5″E
- System: Taiwan Railway railway station
- Line: Pingxi line
- Distance: 8.2 km to Sandiaoling
- Platforms: 1 side platform

Construction
- Structure type: At-grade

Other information
- Station code: 233

History
- Opened: 30 July 1972

Passengers
- 2017: 6,601 per year
- Rank: 207

Services
| Preceding station | Taiwan Railway | Following station |
|---|---|---|
| Shifen towards Sandiaoling | Pingxi line | Lingjiao towards Jingtong |
Location

Wanggu railway station (Chinese: 望古車站; pinyin: Wànggǔ Chēzhàn) is a railway station located in Pingxi District, New Taipei, Taiwan. It is located on the Pingxi line and is operated by the Taiwan Railway.
