= Lingjiao railway station =

Railway station located in New Taipei City, Taiwan

Lingjiao Station 嶺腳車站
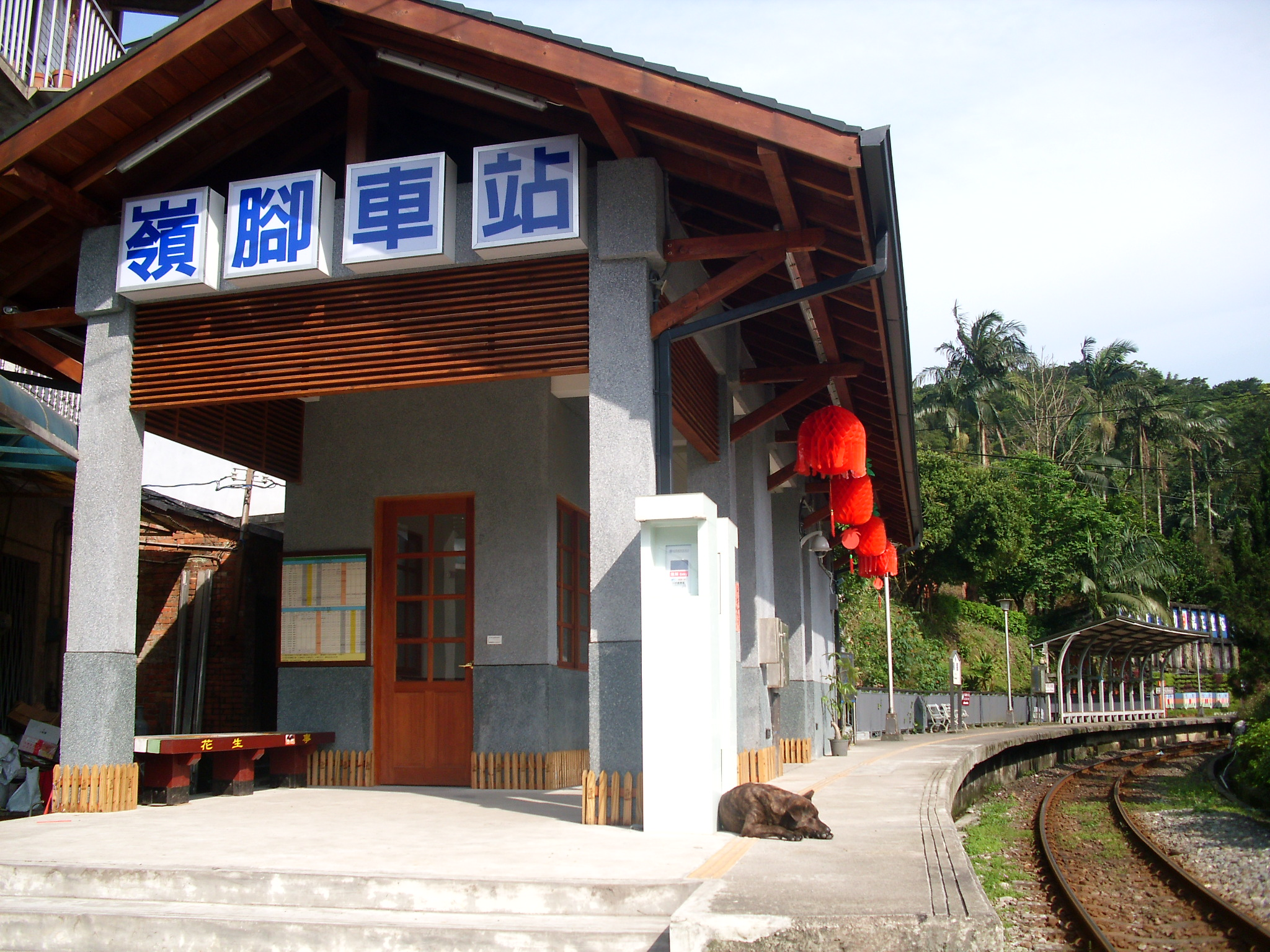

Chinese name
- Traditional Chinese: 嶺腳車站
Transcriptions
Standard Mandarin
- Hanyu Pinyin: Lǐngjiǎo Chēzhàn
- Bopomofo: ㄌㄧㄥˇ ㄐㄧㄠˇ ㄔㄜ ㄓㄢˋ

General information
- Location: Pingxi, New Taipei, Taiwan
- Coordinates: 25°01′48.7″N 121°44′52.6″E
- System: Taiwan Railway railway station
- Line: Pingxi line
- Distance: 10.2 km to Sandiaoling
- Platforms: 1 side platform

Construction
- Structure type: At-grade

Other information
- Station code: 234

History
- Opened: 1 October 1929

Passengers
- 2017: 14,260 per year
- Rank: 199

Services
Preceding station	Taiwan Railway	Following station
Wanggu towards Sandiaoling	Pingxi line	Pingxi towards Jingtong
Location

Lingjiao railway station (Chinese: 嶺腳車站; pinyin: Lǐngjiǎo Chēzhàn) is a railway station located in Pingxi District, New Taipei, Taiwan. It is located on the Pingxi line and is operated by the Taiwan Railway.

== Around the station ==
- Lingjiao Waterfall
