= Dahua =

Dahua may refer to:

- Dahua railway station, New Taipei, Taiwan
- Dahua Subdistrict, Jinping District, Shantou, Guangdong, China
- Dahua Technology
- Dahua Yao Autonomous County, Guangxi, China
- United Overseas Bank, also known as Dahua Bank
