= Jingtong Mining Industry Museum =

Museum in Pingxi, New Taipei, Taiwan

- 菁桐礦業生活館
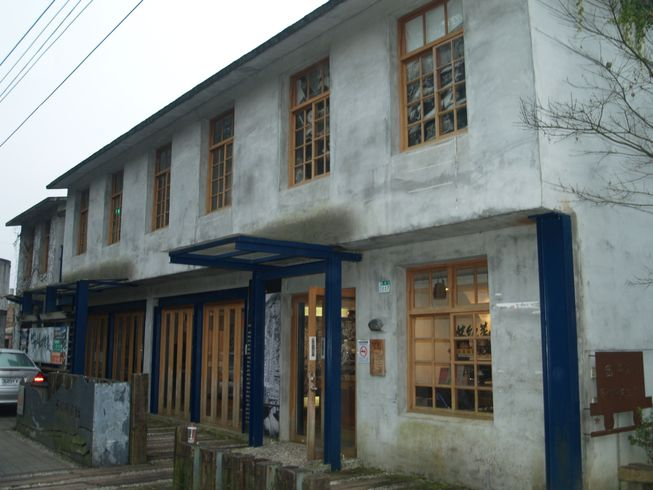
- Established: 27 January 2005
- Location: Pingxi, New Taipei City, Taiwan
- Coordinates: 25°01′26.1″N 121°43′27.6″E
- Type: museum

The Jingtong Mining Industry Museum (traditional Chinese: 菁桐礦業生活館; simplified Chinese: 菁桐矿业生活馆; pinyin: Jīngtóng Kuàngyè Shēnghuó Guǎn) is a museum in Jingtong Borough, Pingxi District, New Taipei City, Taiwan.

== History ==
The museum building was originally the dormitory of Taiwan Railways Administration employees. In 2001, the building underwent renovation by funding from the Ministry of Interior to transform it unto a museum. In 2002, the museum was designated a local culture museum for Pingxi Township and was named Jingtong Mining Industry Museum. In 2003, the Council for Cultural Affairs provided NT$2 million for the museum to make fire protection system, disabled access and building occupation permit In 2004, the museum received NT$3.3 million subsidy to improve its surrounding environment, hold cultural events, conduct research and to promote its collections. It was officially opened as a museum on 27 January 2005.

== Architecture ==
The museum is housed in a two-story building. It has a gift shop located at the side of the museum building.

== Exhibitions ==
The ground floor of the museum displays permanent exhibitions on the landscape of Pingxi Township and the development of coal mining industries in the area. The upper floor of the museum displays artifacts related to coal mining activities and the local culture.

== Transportation ==
The museum is accessible from Jingtong Station of Taiwan Railway.

== See also ==
- List of museums in Taiwan
- Mining in Taiwan
