= Lingjiao Waterfall =

Waterfall in Pingxi, New Taipei, Taiwan

Lingjiao Waterfall 嶺腳瀑布
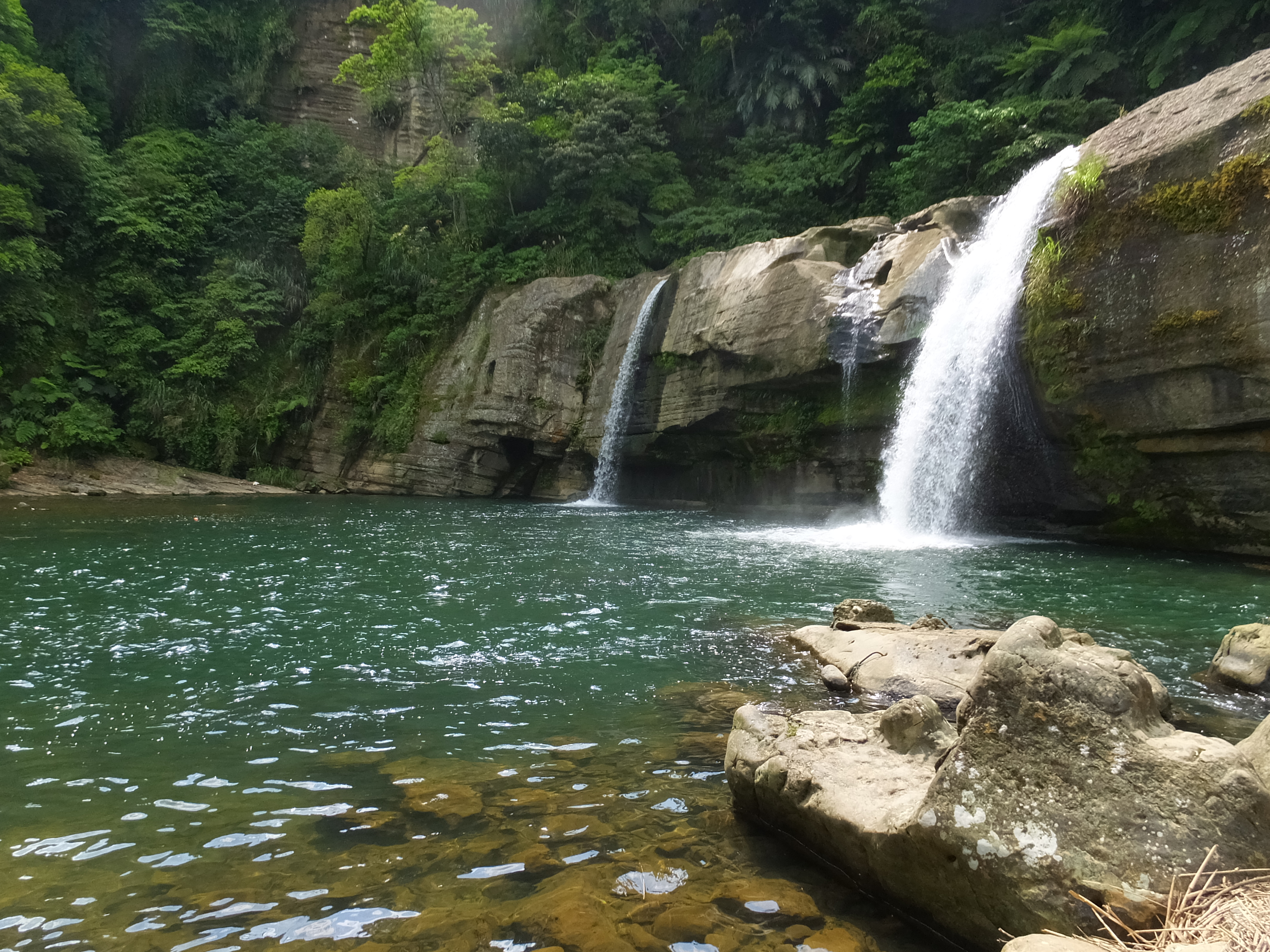
- Interactive map of Lingjiao Waterfall 嶺腳瀑布
- Location: Pingxi, New Taipei, Taiwan
- Coordinates: 25°1′41.1″N 121°44′53.5″E
- Type: waterfall
- Watercourse: Keelung River

The Lingjiao Waterfall (traditional Chinese: 嶺腳瀑布; simplified Chinese: 岭脚瀑布; pinyin: Lǐngjiǎo Pùbù) is a waterfall in Pingxi District, New Taipei, Taiwan.

== History ==
In October 2020, the New Taipei City Government banned water sports from the water around the waterfall following the death of a college student during the summer of 2020.

== Geology ==
The waterfall flows to the Keelung River.

== Transportation ==
The waterfall is accessible within walking distance south of Lingjiao Station of Taiwan Railway.

== See also ==
- List of waterfalls
