= Pingxi railway station =

Railway station located in New Taipei City, Taiwan

Pingxi Station 平溪車站
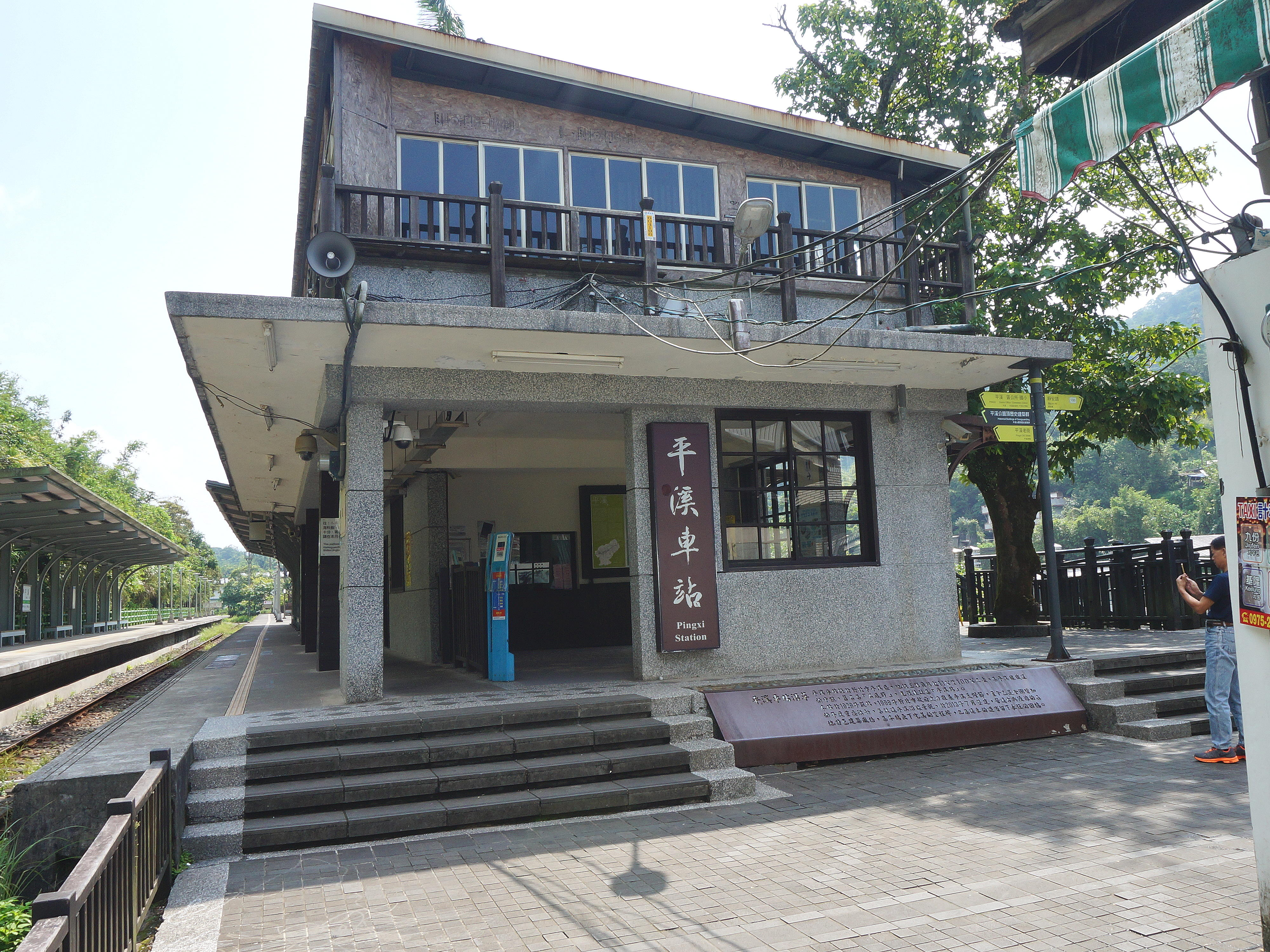
- Pingxi station platform

Chinese name
- Traditional Chinese: 平溪車站
Transcriptions
Standard Mandarin
- Hanyu Pinyin: Píngxī Chēzhàn
- Bopomofo: ㄆㄧㄥˊ ㄒㄧ ㄔㄜ ㄓㄢˋ

General information
- Location: Pingxi, New Taipei, Taiwan
- Coordinates: 25°01′32.0″N 121°44′24.0″E
- System: TRA railway station
- Line: Pingxi line
- Distance: 11.2 km to Sandiaoling
- Platforms: 2 side platforms

Construction
- Structure type: At-grade

Other information
- Station code: 234

History
- Opened: 1 October 1929

Passengers
- 2017: 147,049 per year
- Rank: 137

Services
Preceding station	Taiwan Railway	Following station
Lingjiao towards Sandiaoling	Pingxi line	Jingtong Terminus
Location

Pingxi railway station (Chinese: 平溪車站; pinyin: Píngxī Chēzhàn) is a railway station located in Pingxi District, New Taipei, Taiwan. It is located on the Pingxi line and is operated by the Taiwan Railway.
