= Shezi, Taiwan =

Shezi (Taiwanese Hokkien: Siā-á) is a subdistrict administered by Shilin District in Taipei City, Taiwan. The area was originally an alluvial plain formed by the confluence of the Keelung River and the Tamsui River.

During Typhoon Kit in 1953, severe flooding occurred in the Shezi area. As a result, the Taipei City Government imposed long-term construction restrictions on the innermost areas, including Zhongzhoupou and Xizhoudi—later collectively known as Shezi Island—for a period of 50 years. This policy caused ten villages in the area to experience significantly slower development, making Shezi one of the few lowland areas in Taipei with limited urbanization. The population of Shezi is approximately 10,000.

== Etymology ==
The name “Shezi” originates from the core settlement formerly known as “She-a,” named after a settlement of the Ketagalan Pingpu indigenous group, specifically the Masoong community. The area was originally called Dalangpeng Islet or Dalangpeng Settlement.

From aerial views, the area resembles a bird’s beak. Historically, Shezi was an island separated from the Datong area by a branch of the Keelung River known as Fanzi Ditch, and thus became known as “Shezi Island.” In the 1970s, the river channel silted up and was later filled in to serve as the foundation for the Zhongshan Expressway, transforming the area into a peninsula. Despite this change, the name “Shezi Island” remains in common usage.

== Geography ==
Shezi is bordered by the Keelung River to the east and the Tamsui River to the west, with its southern end connected to central Taipei near the northern side of the Zhongshan Expressway. The Keelung River exits the Taipei Basin and flows into the Tamsui River at the northern tip of Shezi. South of the river confluence lie Shezi, Dalongdong, Yuanshan, and Dadaocheng, while the northern side consists largely of Beitou District and much of Shilin District.

Across the Tamsui River to the west are New Taipei City’s Wugu, Luzhou, and Sanchong districts. To the south, Shezi is connected by land to Datong District. To the east, it faces the urban area of Shilin across the Keelung River, and to the north, it faces Beitou District, marked by the prominent chimney of the Beitou Incineration Plant.

Historically, an environmental sanitation facility once operated along today’s Yanping North Road Section 7, collecting human waste transported by river from central Taipei to fertilize the Shezi Island vegetable farming zone.

== History ==
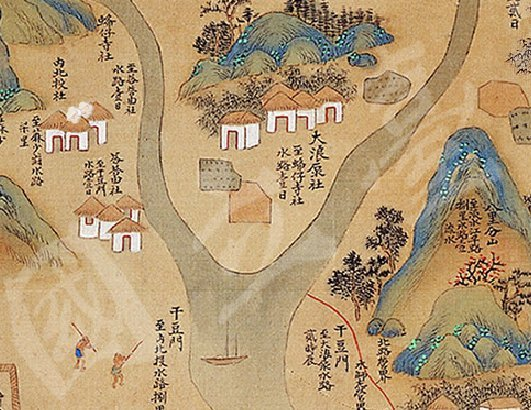
A map from 1704, showing the surrounding area of the Dalang Pumping Station on the Imperial Carriage Map, with Shezi Island in the foreground of the center. The compass direction: North is at the bottom left.

=== Before World War II ===
Historical maps drawn by the Dutch in 1654 show the Keelung River entering the Tamsui River south of the present-day Shezi area, with no sandbanks present. This suggests that Shezi Island formed after the 1650s.

During the Japanese occupation, Shezi was located within the Taipei Prefecture, and was a district under the jurisdiction of the Shilin Branch Prefecture.

In 1694, a major earthquake caused parts of the Taipei Basin to subside, creating what became known as Lake Taipei. During the Qianlong period, sedimentation gradually filled the lake, forming a sandbank known as Langpeng Islet in the southern part of today’s Shezi area. Another earthquake in 1754 caused the sandbank to subside again, creating marshland. During dry seasons, Han tenant farmers reclaimed land by building embankments, eventually forming three cultivation zones separated by small waterways.

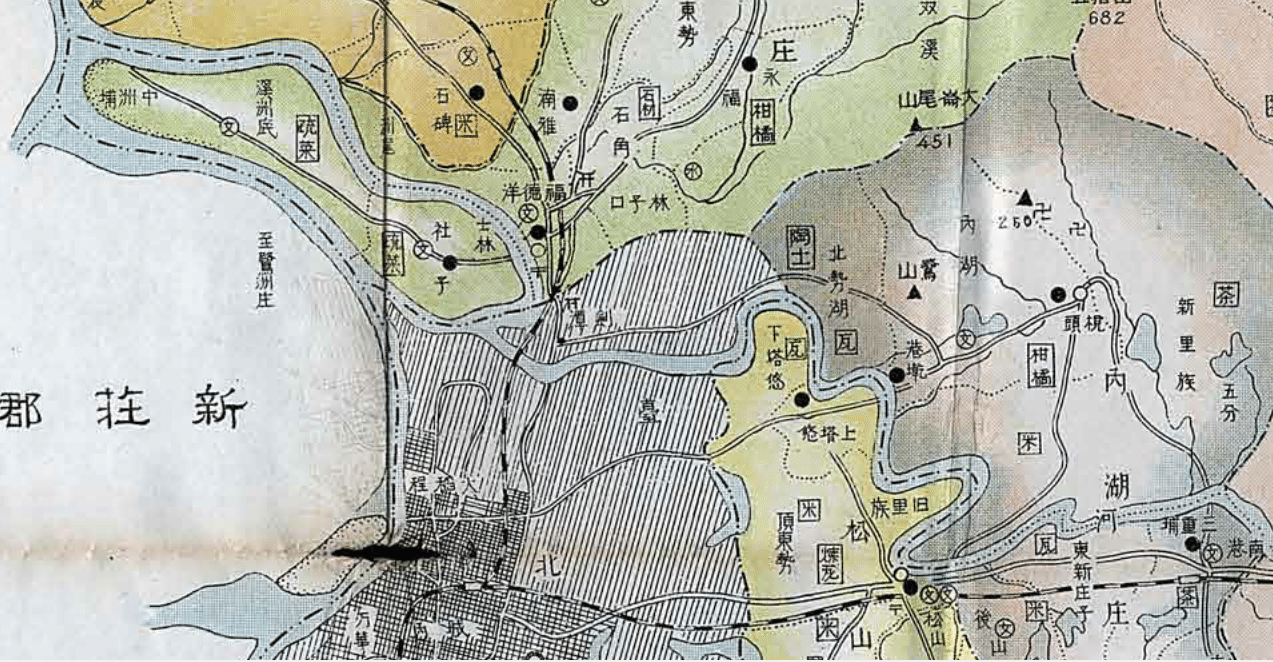
Shezi Island was located on Shilin Street in Qixing County during the Japanese occupation. Shezi Island is on the left side of this map, dated 1932. This confirms that Shezi Island was an island in the middle of the confluence of the Tamsui River and the Keelung River at that time.

Indigenous Masoong communities later relocated to higher ground, though they continued to claim land ownership. By the late Qing dynasty, settlements such as Shezi Village, Fuzhou Village, and Zhongzhou Village had formed.

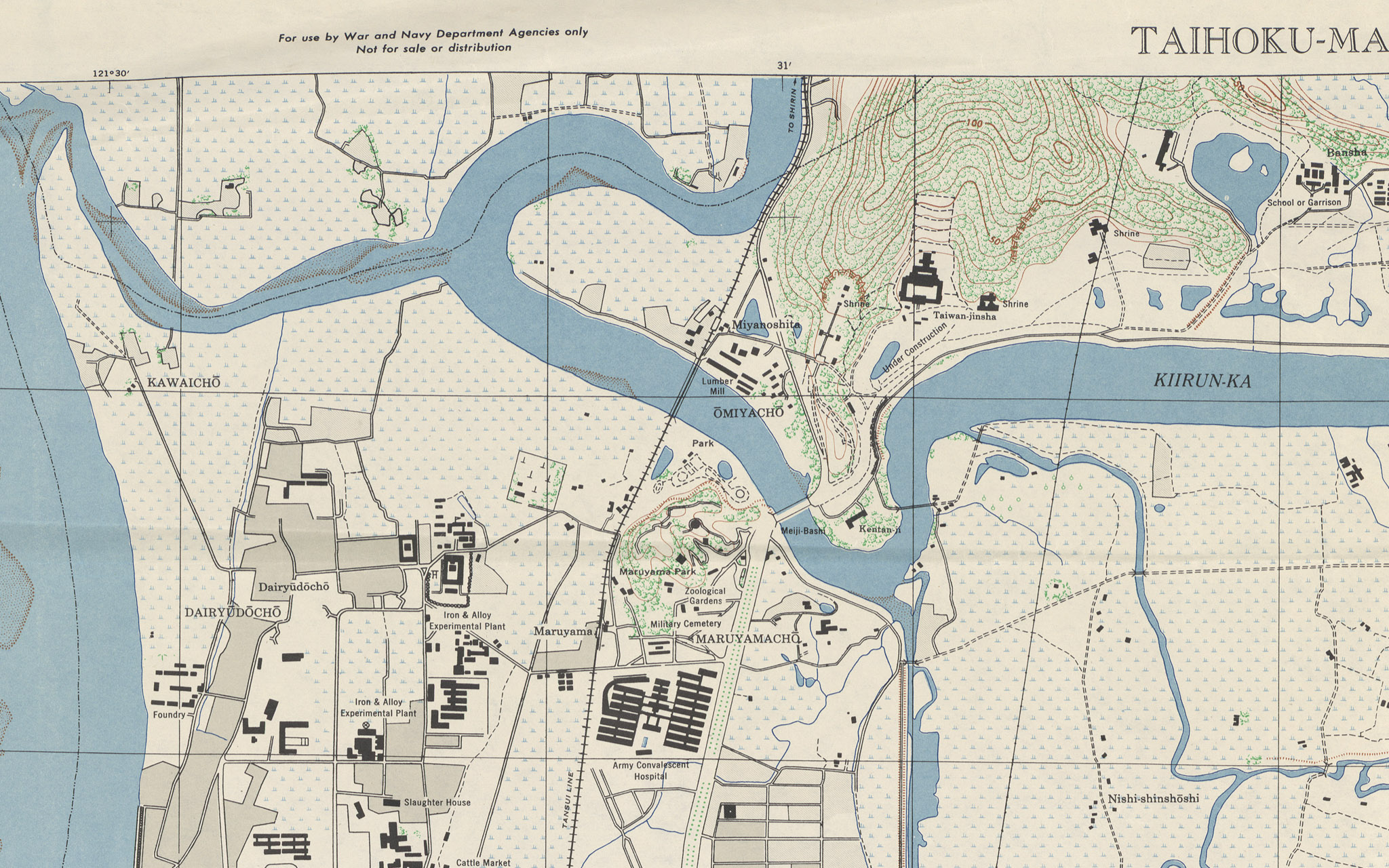
According to a map of Taipei taken and drawn by the U.S. military in 1945, Shezi Island (east bank of the Tamsui River) is located in the upper left corner of the map.

During the Japanese colonial period, surveys recorded only a small number of indigenous residents remaining in the area. By the early 20th century, river sedimentation had merged several sandbanks into a gourd-shaped island between the Tamsui and Keelung rivers. Due to flood risks, the area was excluded from major economic development.

Administrative reforms under Japanese rule placed Shezi under various local jurisdictions. In 1939, the Shilin Suspension Bridge connecting Shezi and Shilin was completed.

=== Postwar Period and River Engineering ===
After World War II, Shezi became part of Shilin Township under Taipei County. Following severe flooding caused by Typhoons Kit (1953) and Gloria (1963), the government implemented major flood control projects, including straightening sections of the Keelung River. These works altered the island’s shape and separated the Hougang area from the main body of Shezi Island.

By the 1970s, construction of the Zhongshan Expressway filled in former river channels, connecting Shezi Island to Taipei’s main urban area and turning it into a peninsula. Long-term building bans were imposed on flood-prone areas, halting development for decades.

=== Development Debates and Recent Projects ===
In the 2010s, proposals such as the “Taipei Manhattan Project” and later the “Eco-Shezi Island Plan” sought to redevelop the area with enhanced flood protection. These plans sparked public debate due to environmental concerns, high costs, and resident displacement.

In 2016, an i-Voting process was held, with the majority favoring an ecological development approach. In 2018, the central government approved the long-delayed development plan, ending nearly half a century of construction restrictions.

Recent infrastructure projects include new bridges, road extensions, and the planned MRT Circular Line North Section. Construction of the Shezi Station began in 2024, with completion expected in 2032.
