= Pingxi District =

District in New Taipei, Taiwan

Pingxi 平溪區 Heikei
- District
- Pingxi District
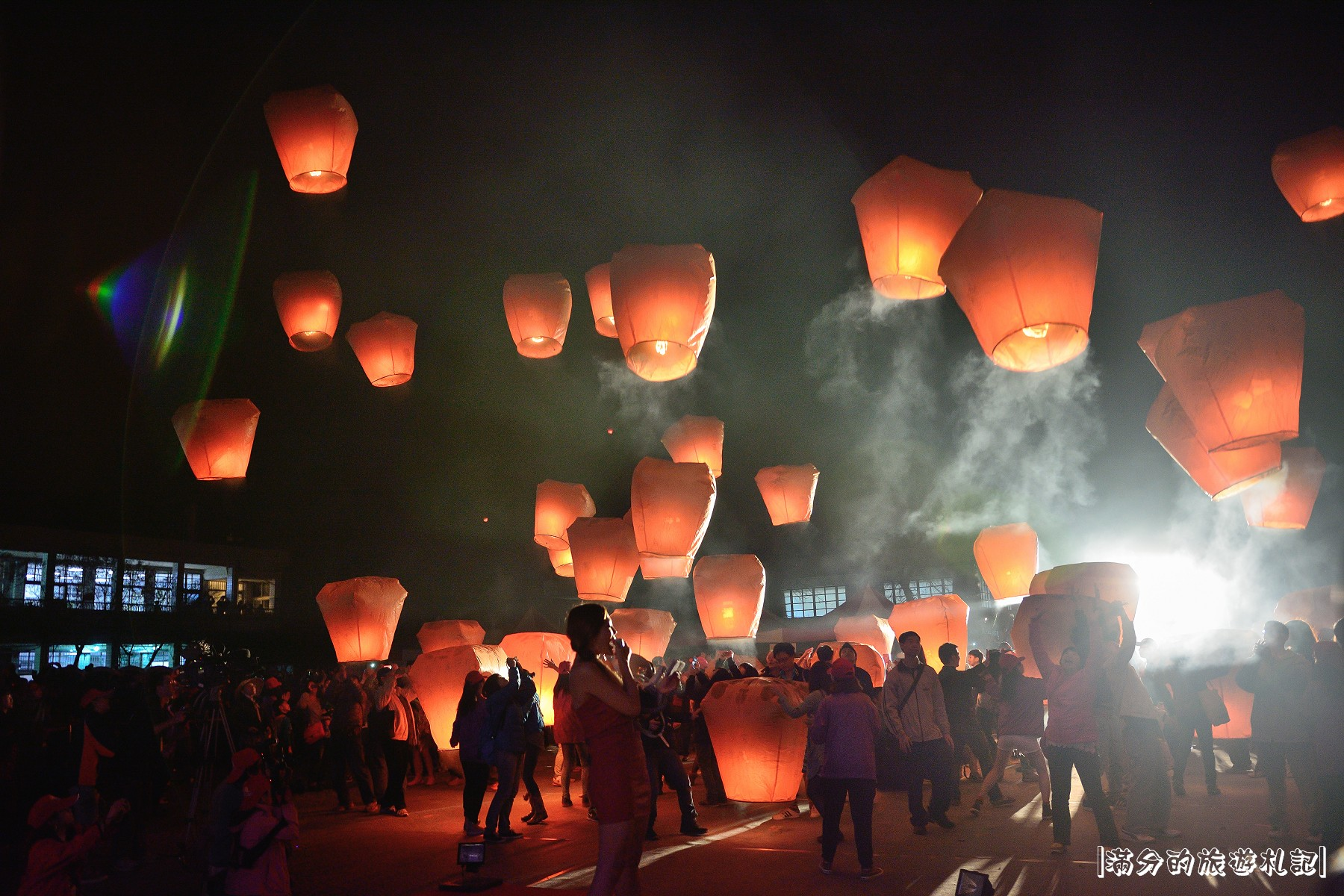
- Sky Lantern Festival in Pingxi District

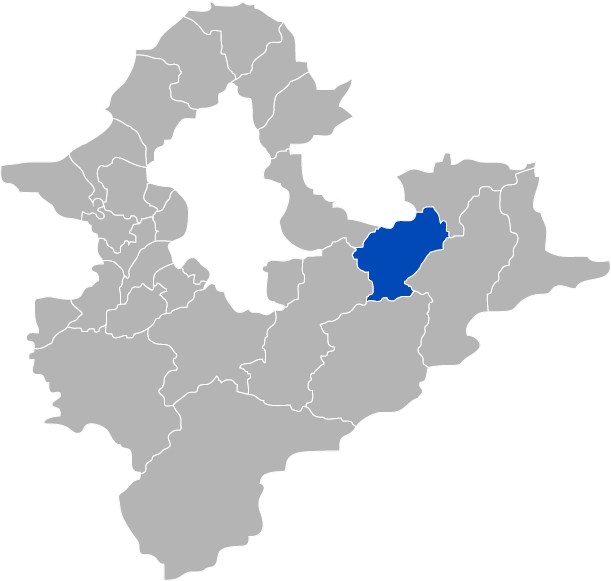
- Pingxi District in New Taipei City
- Coordinates: 25.025797°N 121.739144°E
- Country: Republic of China (Taiwan)
- Special municipality: New Taipei City

Area
  - Total: 71.34 km^{2} (27.54 sq mi)

Population (February 2023)
  - Total: 4,253
- Time zone: +8
- Website: www.pingshi.tpc.gov.tw (in Chinese)

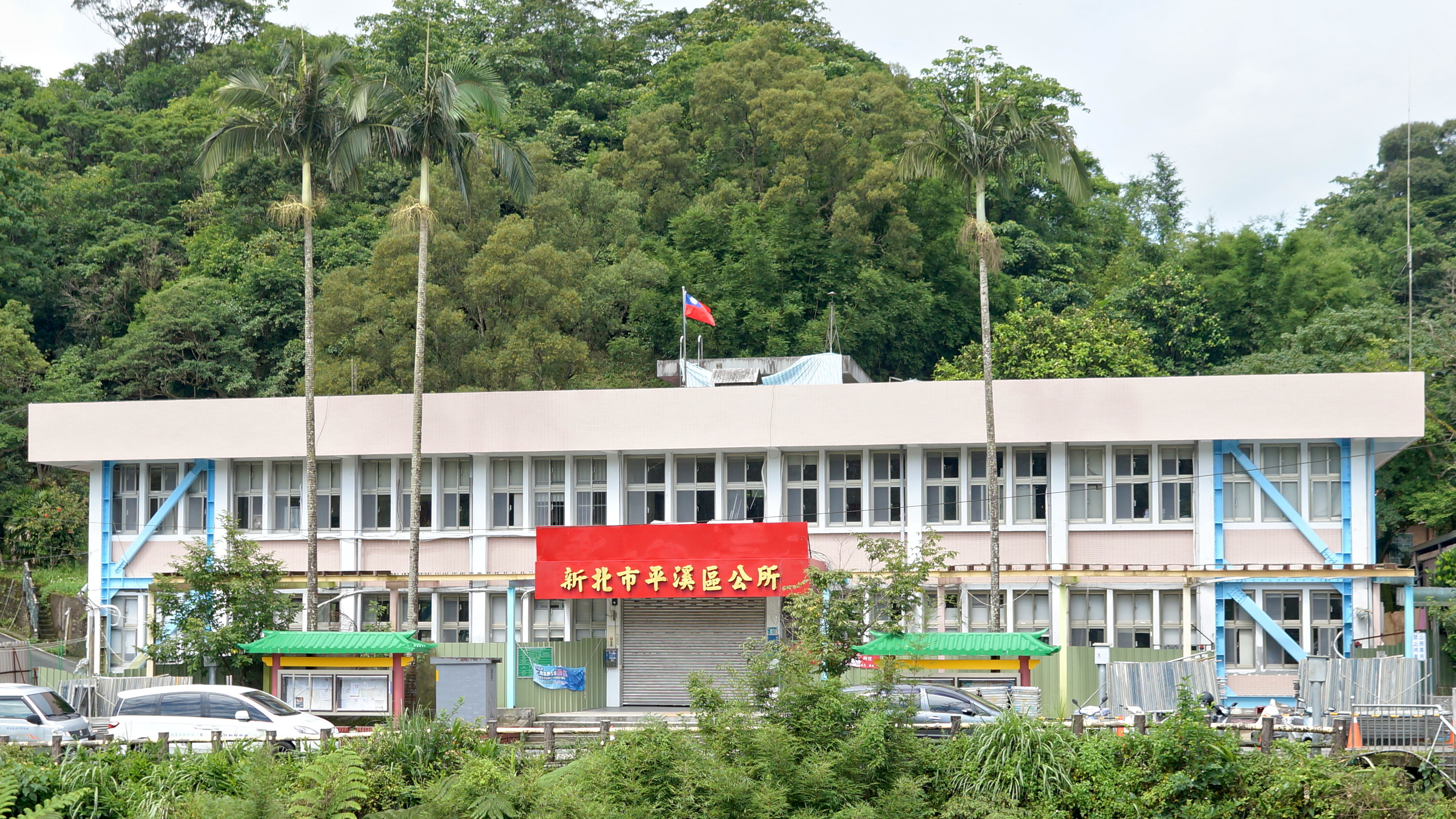
Pingxi District Office

Pingxi District (Chinese: 平溪區; pinyin: Píngxī Qū; Wade–Giles: P'ing^{2}-hsi^{1} Ch'ü^{1}; Pe̍h-ōe-jī: Pêng-khoe-khu, Pêng-khe-khu; also spelled Pinghsi), is a rural district in New Taipei, Taiwan. The source of the Keelung River is in Jingtong, which is inside Pingxi District. It was an important coal mining town in the early 20th century. Its population of 4,253 as of February 2023 is the smallest among the districts of New Taipei City.

== Tourist attractions ==
- Sky Lantern Festival: In Pingxi, every year during the Lantern Festival, people have their wishes written on sky lanterns, and release them to the skies during the Pingxi International Sky Lantern Festival.
- Jingtong Coal Memorial Park
- Jingtong Mining Industry Museum
- Lingjiao Waterfall
- Shifen Waterfall
- Taiwan Coal Mine Museum
- Jingtong Old Street
- Shifen Old Street

== Transportation ==
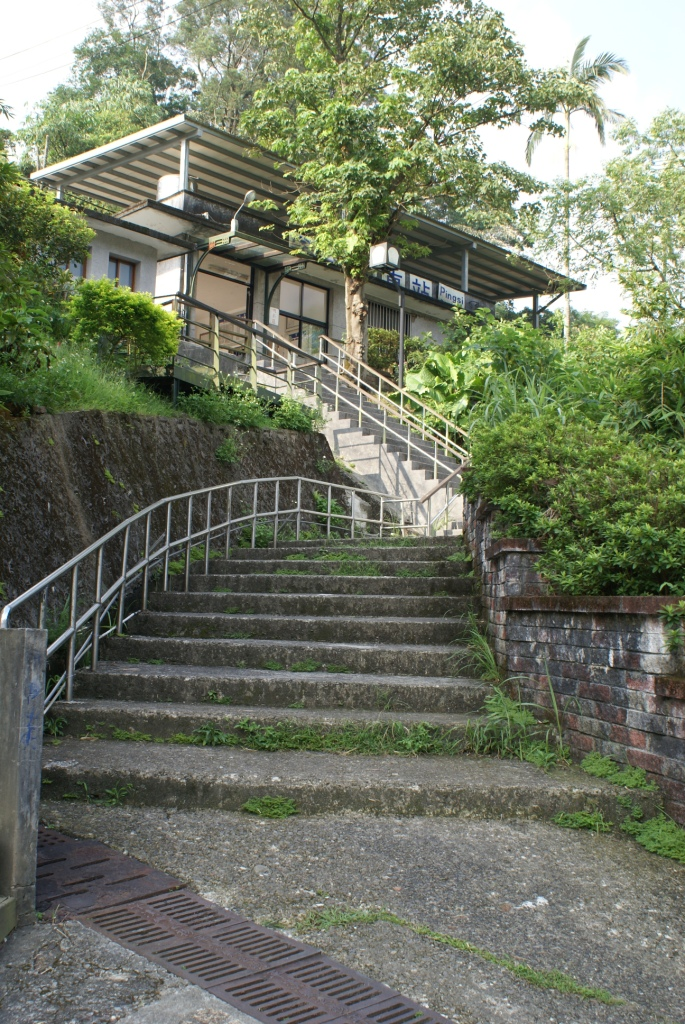
Pingxi Rail Station

Pingxi is served by the Pingxi Line of Taiwan Railway, which includes:

- Dahua Station
- Shifen Station
- Wanggu Station
- Lingjiao Station
- Pingxi Station
- Jingtong Station

== Notable natives ==
- Lin Hung-chih, member of Legislative Yuan (2005–2016)

== See also ==
- New Taipei
