= Dahua railway station =

Railway station located in New Taipei City, Taiwan

Dahua Station 大華車站
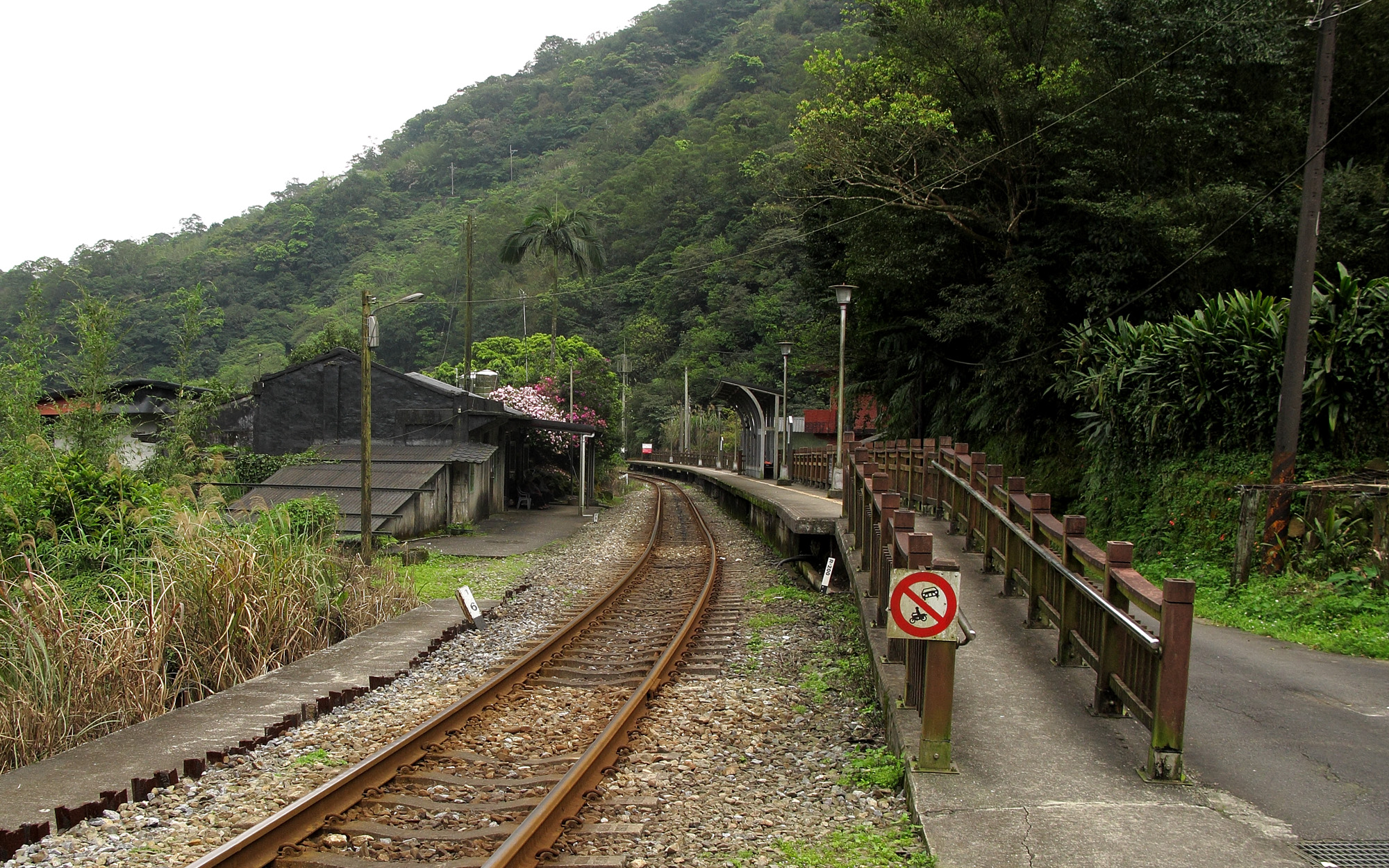

Chinese name
- Traditional Chinese: 大華車站
Transcriptions
Standard Mandarin
- Hanyu Pinyin: Dàhuá Chēzhàn
- Bopomofo: ㄉㄚˋ ㄏㄨㄚˊ ㄔㄜ ㄓㄢˋ

General information
- Location: Pingxi, New Taipei, Taiwan
- Coordinates: 25°02′59.6″N 121°47′51.0″E
- System: Taiwan Railway railway station
- Line: Pingxi line
- Distance: 3.5 km to Sandiaoling
- Platforms: 1 side platform

Construction
- Structure type: At-grade

Other information
- Station code: 231

History
- Opened: 12 October 1956

Passengers
- 2017: 5,603 per year
- Rank: 217

Services
| Preceding station | Taiwan Railway | Following station |
|---|---|---|
| Sandiaoling Terminus | Pingxi line | Shifen towards Jingtong |
Location

Dahua railway station (Chinese: 大華車站; pinyin: Dàhuá Chēzhàn) is a railway station located in Pingxi District, New Taipei, Taiwan. It is located on the Pingxi line and is operated by the Taiwan Railway.
