= Shifen Waterfall =

Waterfall in Pingxi, New Taipei, Taiwan

Shifen Waterfall 十分瀑布
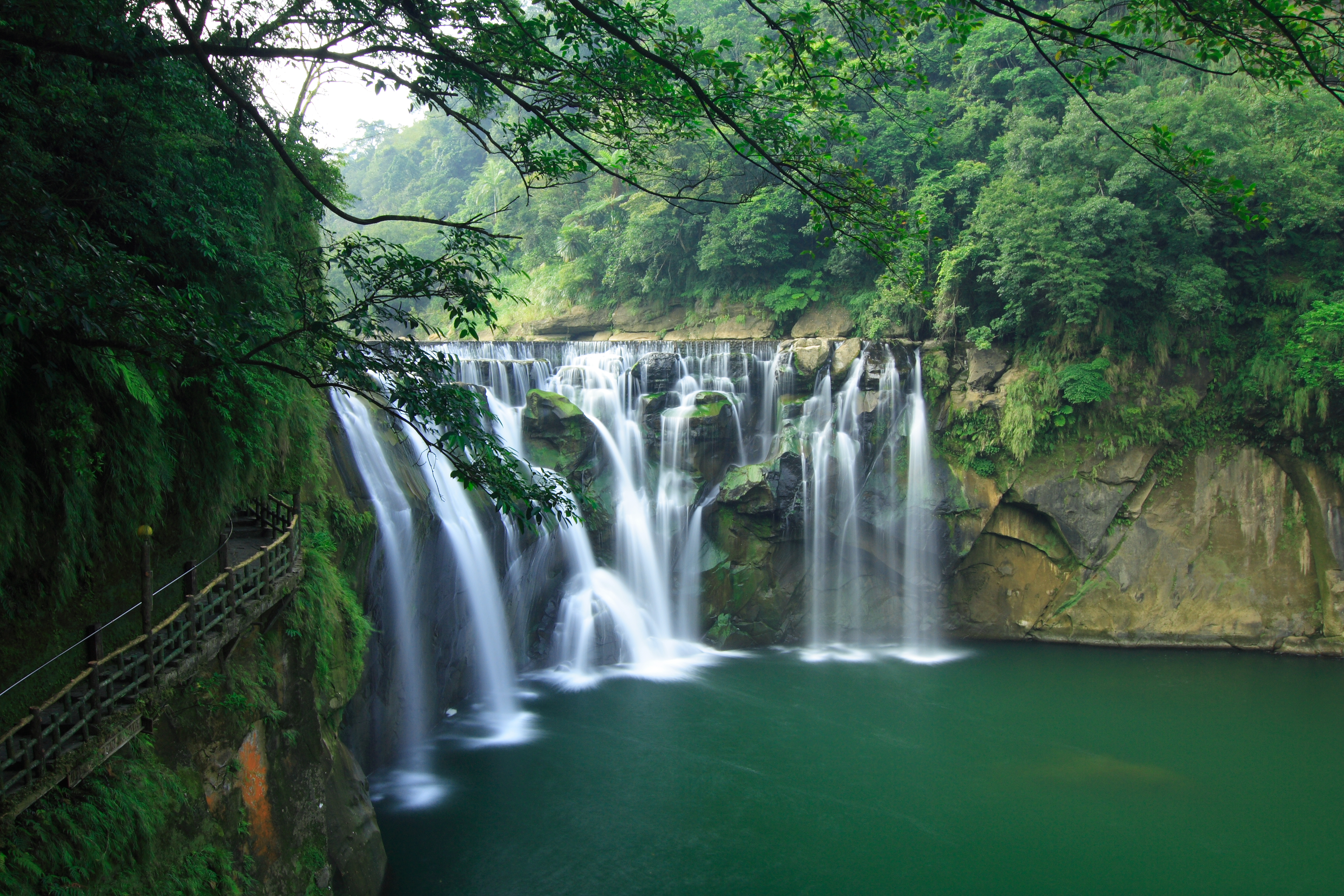
- Interactive map of Shifen Waterfall 十分瀑布
- Location: Keelung River, Pingxi, New Taipei, Taiwan
- Coordinates: 25°2′57.8″N 121°47′15.86″E
- Type: Tiered
- Total height: 20 m (66 ft)
- Total width: 40 m (131 ft)
- Watercourse: Keelung River

Shifen Waterfall (Chinese: 十分瀑布; pinyin: Shífēn Pùbù) is a scenic waterfall located in Pingxi District, New Taipei City, Taiwan, on the upper reaches of the Keelung River. The falls' total height is 20 metres (66 ft) and 40 metres (130 ft) in width, making it the broadest waterfall in Taiwan. It is a cascade waterfall in which the water flows in one direction and the rock is sloped in the opposite.

== Name ==
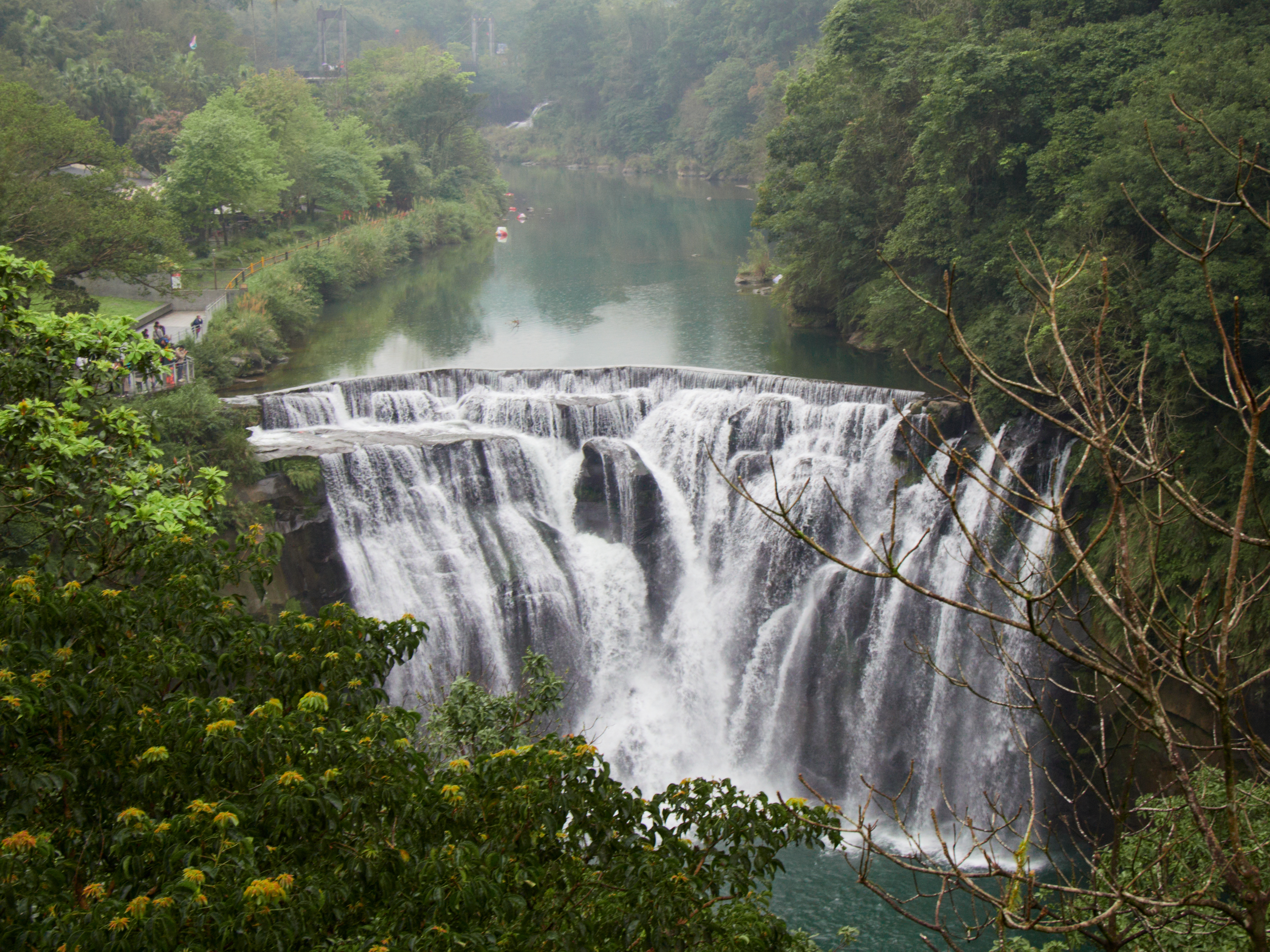
Shifen Waterfall on the Keelung River, elevated view.

The name Shifen was taken from the 10 original families who develop the area in Pingxi. The waterfall also is nicknamed the Little Niagara of Taiwan.

== Geology ==
The riverbed of the waterfall consists of several potholes which was caused by the uneven flow of the river, thus creating vortexes that traps passing rocks and causing them to spin and carve holes.

== Access ==
The waterfall is at about 2 km northeast of Shifen station of Taiwan Railway.

The land surrounding the waterfall was private land for a long time and a private company collected entrance fees from the visitors. In 2014, New Taipei city's Tourism and Travel Department acquired the land around the waterfall and created a municipal park and made the admission to the park free.

During the summer from June 1 to Sep 30, the park's opening hours are 9 a.m. to 6 p.m., and the latest time for visitors to enter the park is 5:30 p.m. During the rest of the year from Oct 1 to May 31, opening hours are 9 a.m. to 5 p.m., and the latest time for visitors to enter the park is 4:30 p.m.

== See also ==
- List of tourist attractions in Taiwan
- List of waterfalls
