= Taiwan Coal Mine Museum =

Museum in Pingxi, New Taipei, Taiwan

- 台灣煤礦博物館

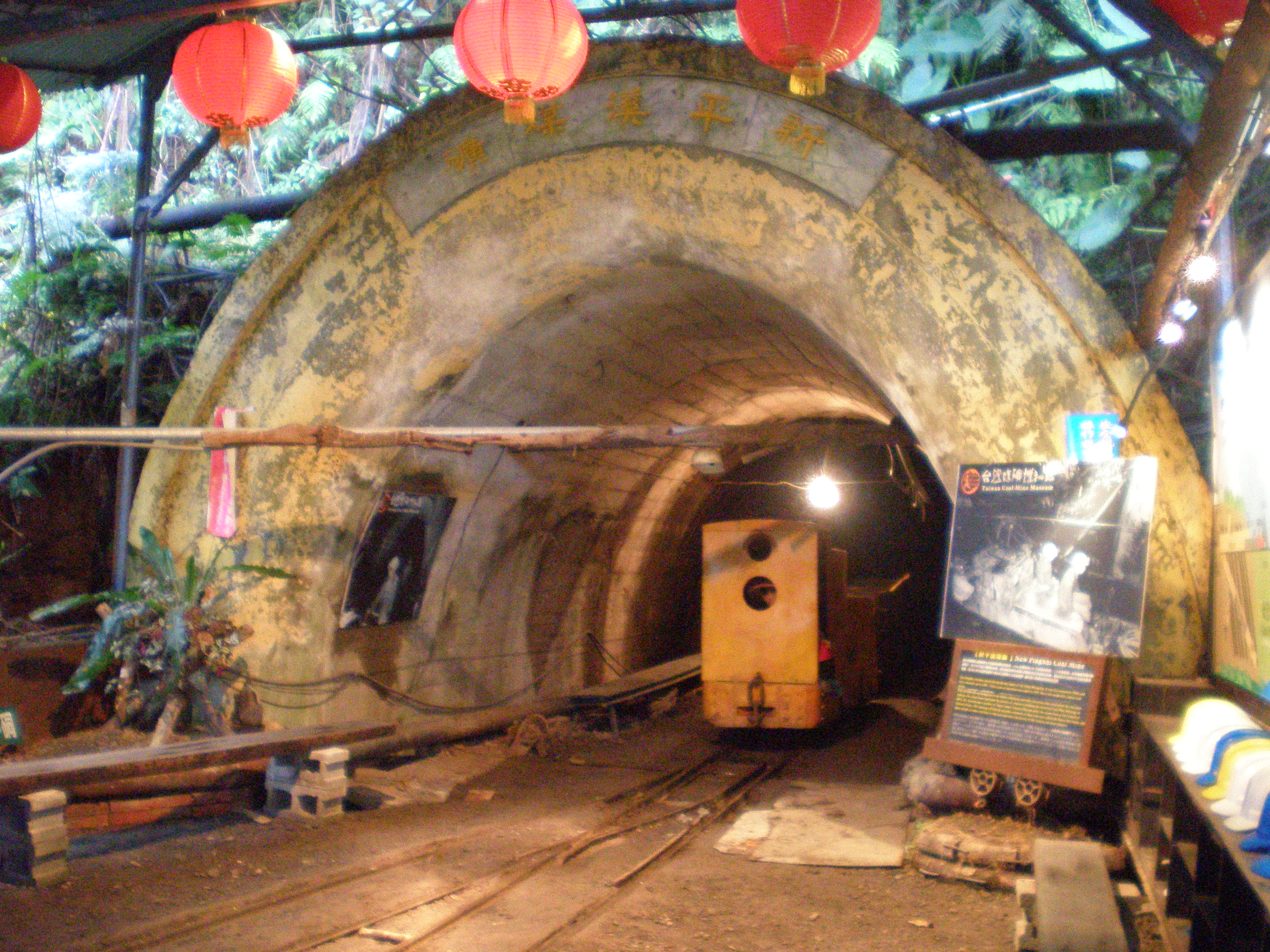
- Established: 2001
- Location: Pingxi, New Taipei, Taiwan
- Coordinates: 25°03′10″N 121°46′25″E
- Type: museum
- Website: Official website (in Chinese)

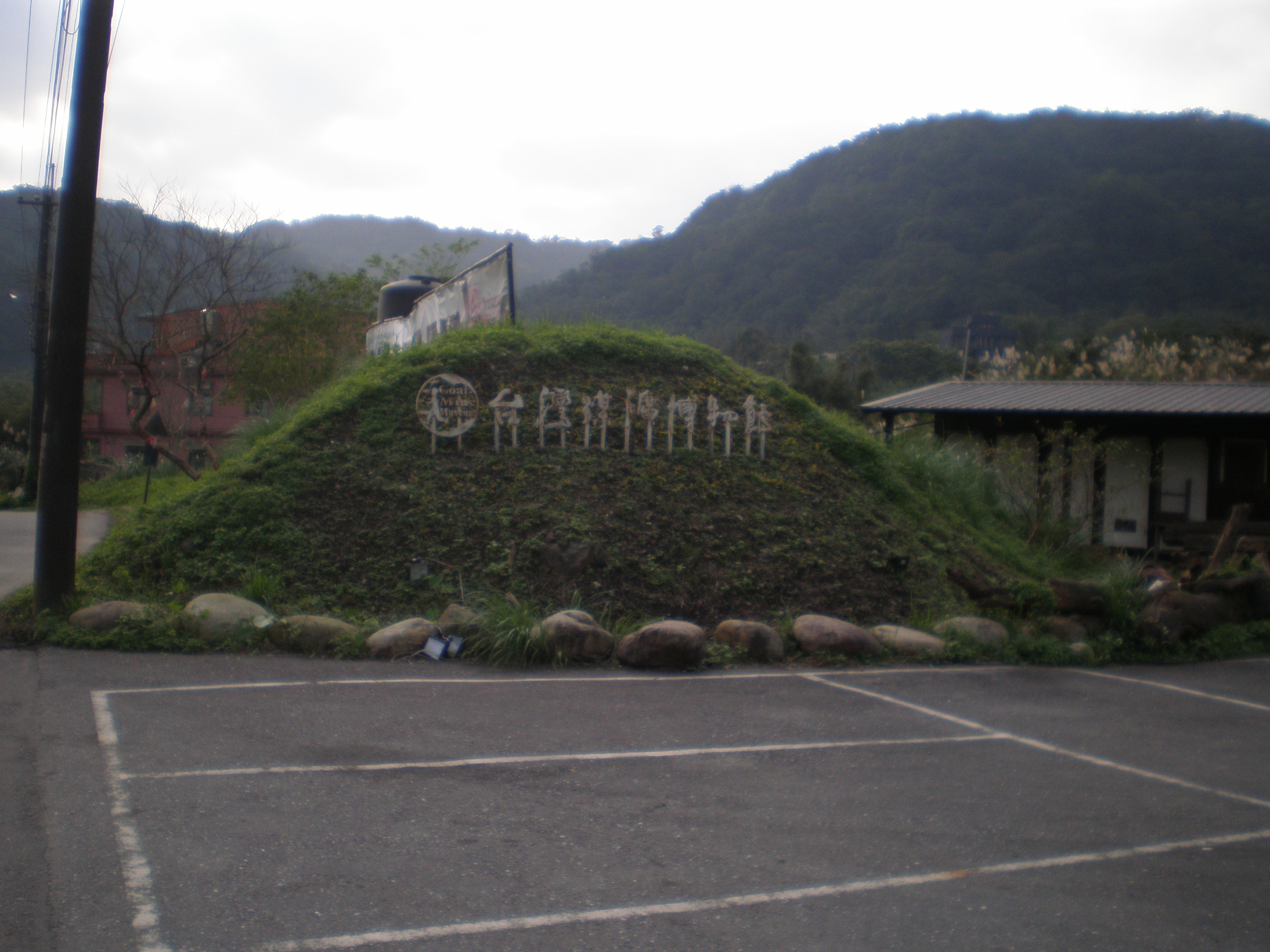
Taiwan Coal Mine Museum entrance

The Taiwan Coal Mine Museum (traditional Chinese: 台灣煤礦博物館; simplified Chinese: 台湾煤矿博物馆; pinyin: Táiwān Méikuàng Bówùguǎn) is a museum about coal mining in Pingxi District, New Taipei City, Taiwan.

== History ==
The museum used to be the coal mining site during the later stage of Pingxi Era of Tai-Yiang Mining Inc called the New Pingxi Mine. It was first opened in 1965 and the first coal extracted was done in 1967. In 1997, the mining activity was halted due to the more competitive price from imported coal to Taiwan. With the help from railway enthusiasts and other associates that cared about the coal mining industry, Mr. Gong Yung-tsang began to create buildings in this historical site and created the museum in 2001 with the storing ground became the museum entrance.

After decades of mining, the site produced tons of abandoned overburden rocks which created a rock mountain 140 meters high. Due to the lack of vegetation growth to grasp firm holds of the gravel, a side of the rock mountain tumbled in July 2005, creating The Abandoned Rock Mountain.

== Exhibitions ==
- Mine locomotive
- Large-scale mining machinery
- Small-scale exhibition hall
- Simulated pit

== Transportation ==
The museum is accessible within walking distance northeast from Shifen Station of the Taiwan Railway.

== See also ==
- List of museums in Taiwan
- Mining in Taiwan
