= Jingtong =

Area in Pingxi, New Taipei, Taiwan

Coordinates: 25°01′26″N 121°43′24″E

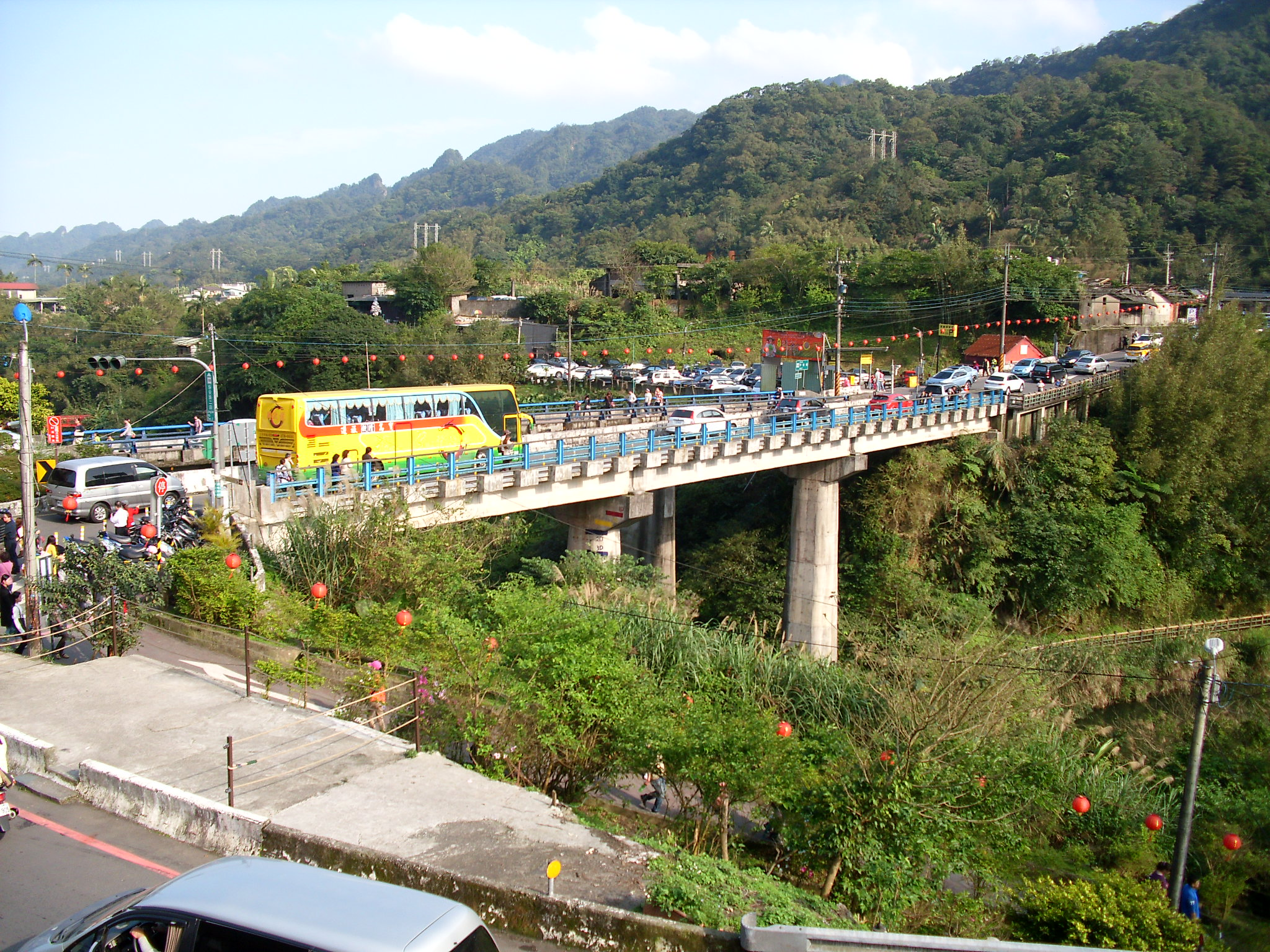
Jingtong

Jingtong (Chinese: 菁桐; pinyin: Jīngtóng) is a locale in Pingxi District, New Taipei City, Taiwan. Originally a coal mining town, today it is known mostly for tourism, with numerous souvenir shops and exhibits on the history of the area and the coal mining industry.

== Tourist attractions ==
- Jingtong Coal Memorial Park
- Jingtong Mining Industry Museum
- Jingtong Old Street
- Jingtong Railway Story House

== Transportation ==
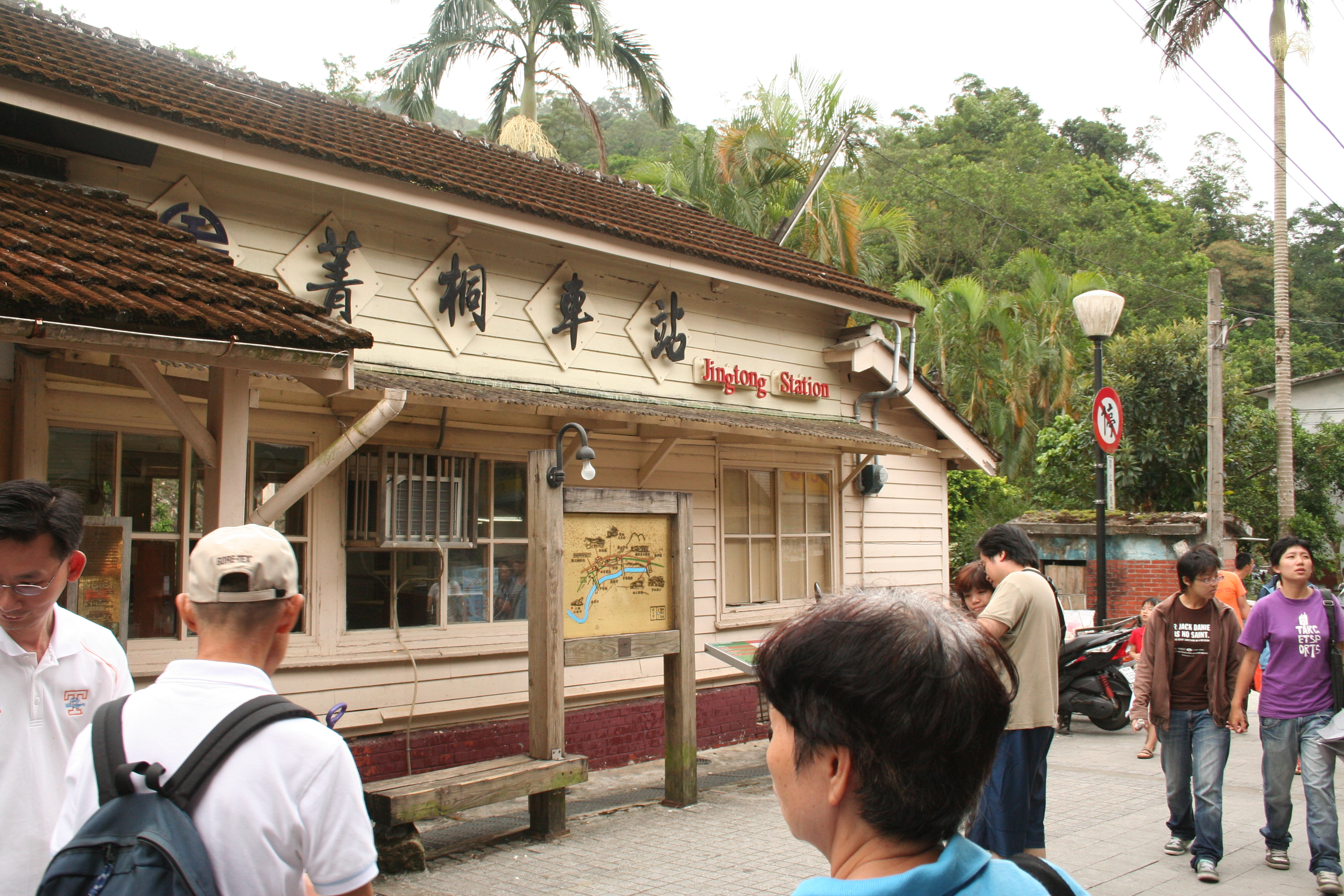
Jingtong Station

Jingtong Station was built by the Japanese in the 1930s. The town is a terminus of the Pingxi Line of the Taiwan Railway.

== See also ==
- New Taipei City
