= Shifeng =

Shifeng may refer to:

- Shifeng, Zhuzhou, a district of Zhuzhou, Hunan, China
- Shifeng Bridge, in Beijing, China

== See also ==
- Shifen (disambiguation)
