= Shifen railway station =

Railway station located in New Taipei City, Taiwan

Shifen Station 十分車站
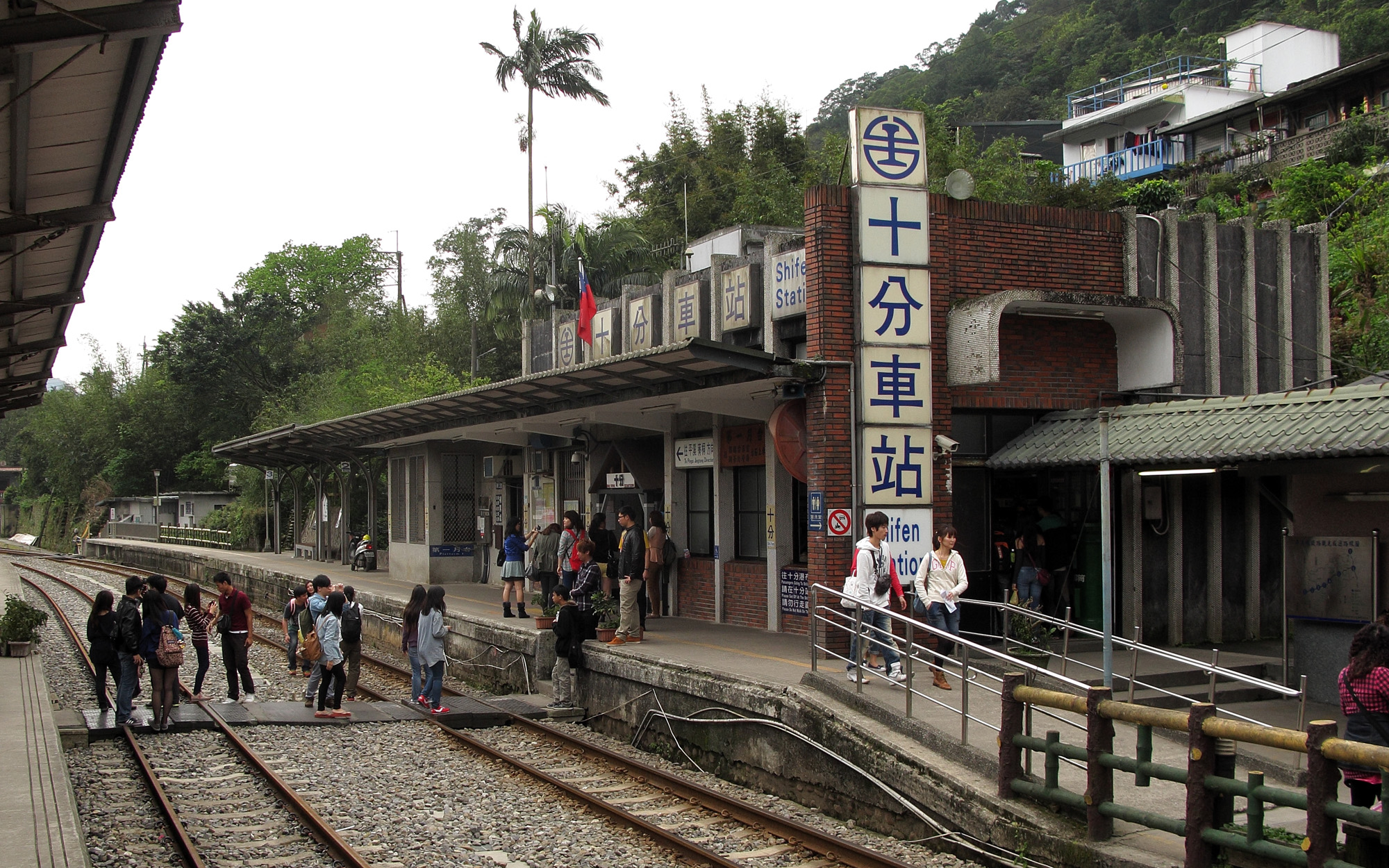
- Station platform

Chinese name
- Traditional Chinese: 十分車站
Transcriptions
Standard Mandarin
- Hanyu Pinyin: Shífēn Chēzhàn
- Bopomofo: ㄕˊ ㄈㄣ ㄔㄜ ㄓㄢˋ

General information
- Location: Pingxi, New Taipei City; Taiwan
- Coordinates: 25°02′27.5″N 121°46′30.2″E
- System: TRA railway station
- Line: Pingxi line
- Distance: 6.4 km to Sandiaoling
- Platforms: 1 island platform 1 side platform

Construction
- Structure type: At-grade

Other information
- Station code: 232

History
- Opened: 1 October 1929

Passengers
- 2017: 495,643 per year
- Rank: 78

Services
Preceding station	Taiwan Railway	Following station
Dahua towards Sandiaoling	Pingxi line	Wanggu towards Jingtong
Location

Shifen railway station (Chinese: 十分車站; pinyin: Shífēn Chēzhàn) is located in Pingxi District, New Taipei, Taiwan. It is located on the Pingxi line and is operated by the Taiwan Railway.

== Pingxi Sky Lantern Festival ==
Since the 1990s the New Taipei City Government has supported the Pingxi Sky Lantern Festival and regular lantern releases as tourist attractions. These are officially organized events, with details about management, safety regulations, and promotional resources provided by the local authorities. Daily tours take tourists to light lanterns on the railway line near the station, between trains, and release them. The nearby mountains provide a scenic backdrop and keep the lanterns within the valley.

== Around the station ==
- Taiwan Coal Mine Museum

== Gallery ==
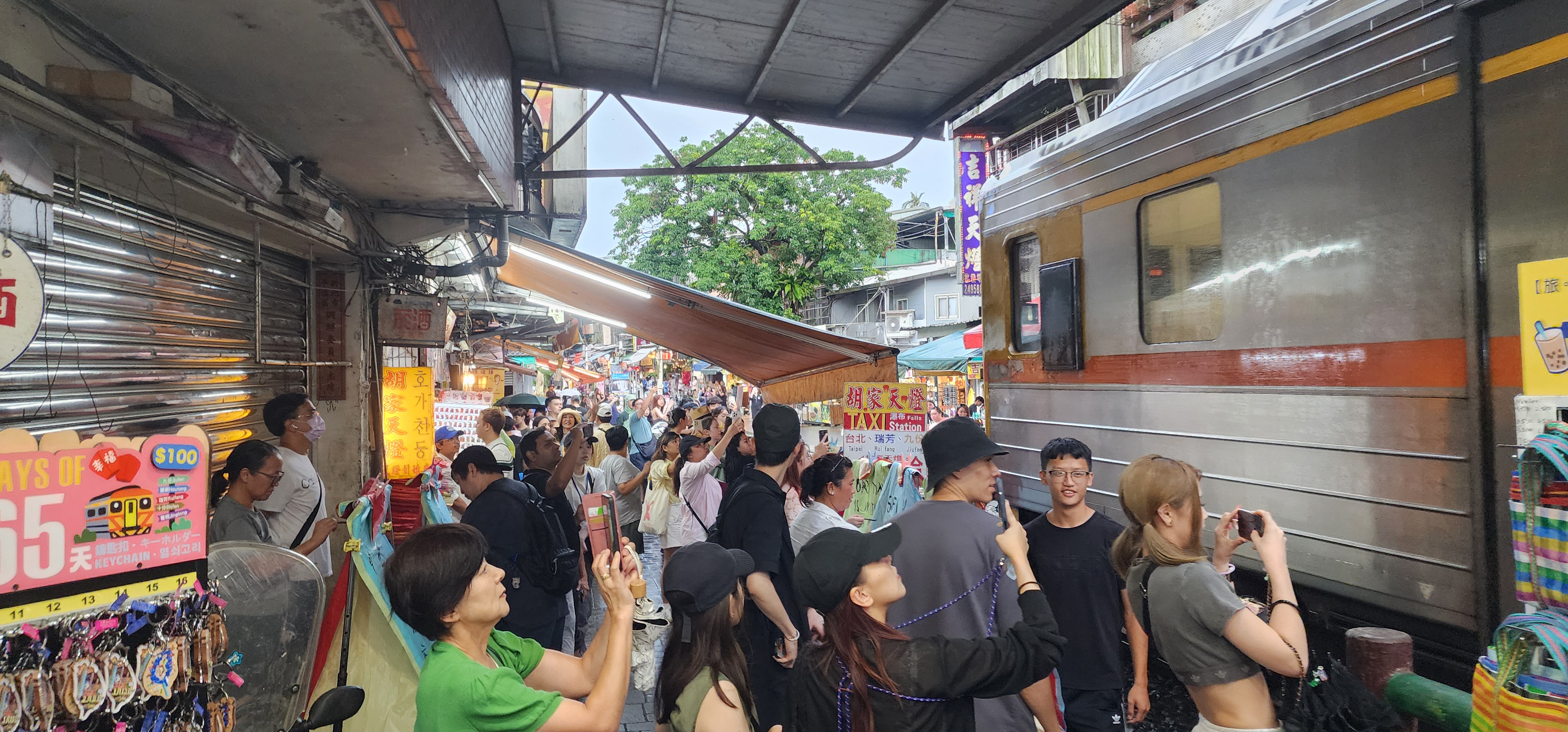
Train passing through crowds of tourists on the railway line in Shifen

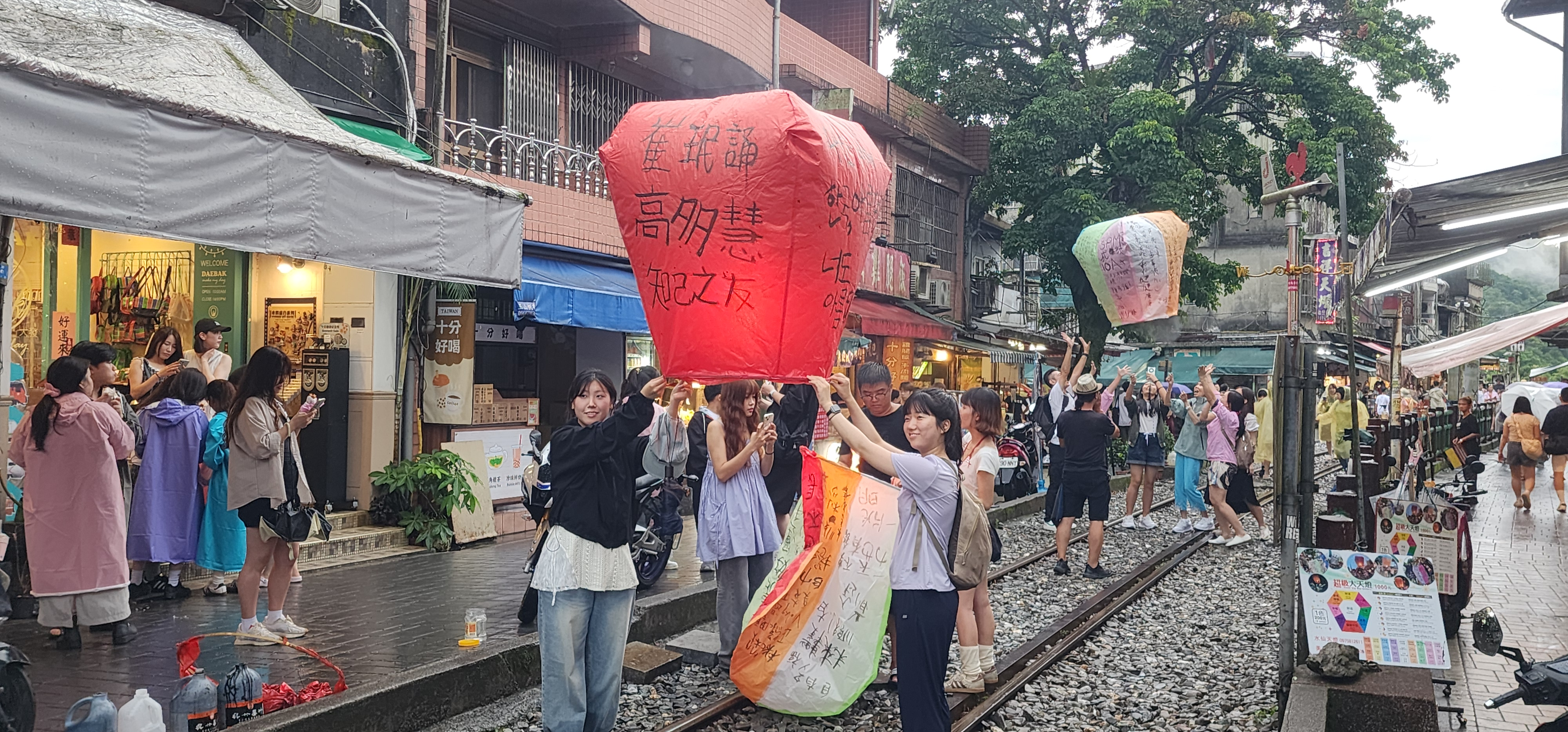
Sky lantern release in Shifen

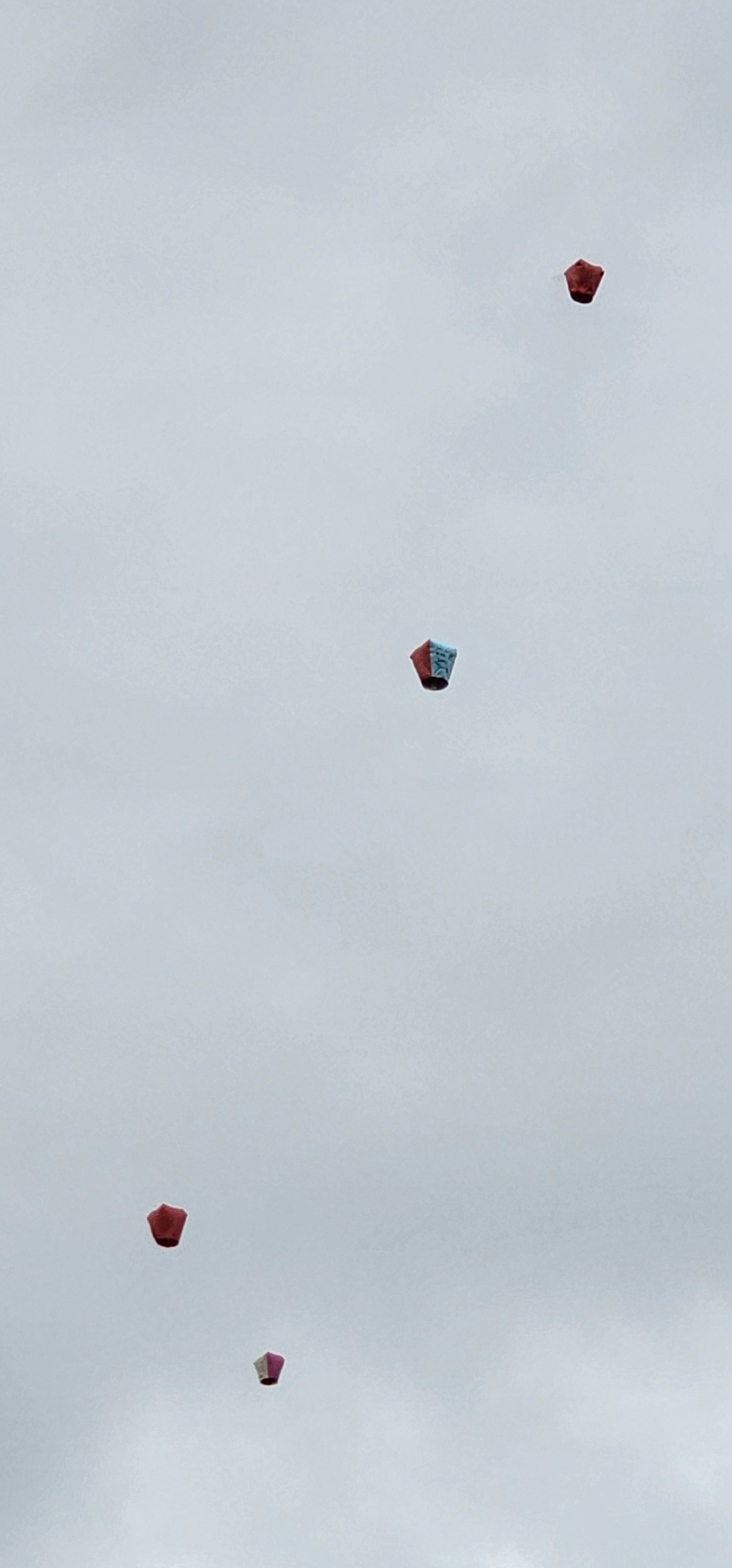
Sky lantern release in Shifen

Tourists standing beside the railway tracks running through Shifen Old Street as a diesel train approaches.
