= Jingtong Coal Memorial Park =

Coal mine in Pingxi, New Taipei, Taiwan

- 菁桐煤礦紀念公園
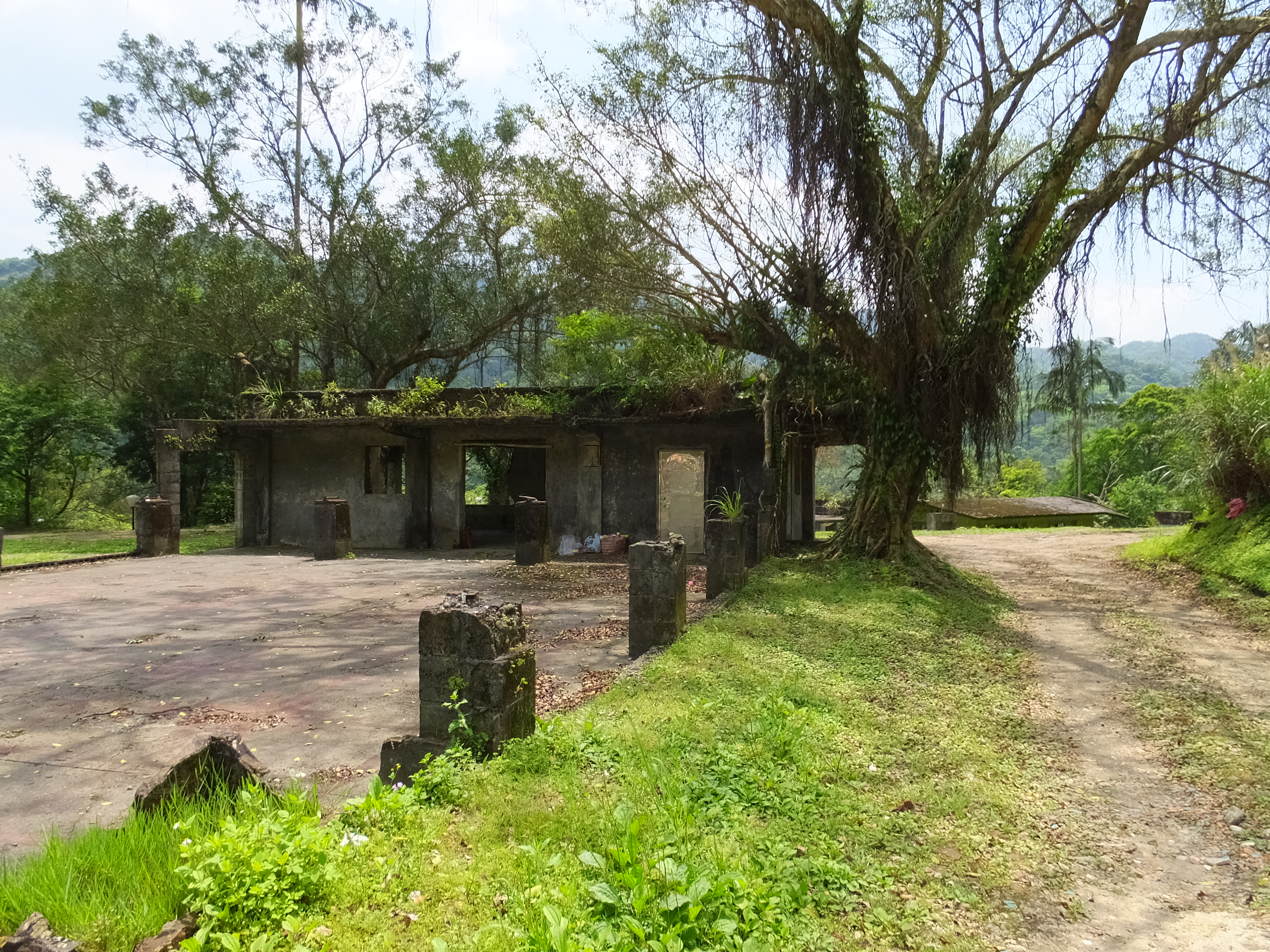

- Location within Taiwan

General information
- Type: former coal mine
- Location: Pingxi, New Taipei, Taiwan
- Coordinates: 25°01′29.4″N 121°43′28.1″E

The Jingtong Coal Memorial Park (traditional Chinese: 菁桐煤礦紀念公園; simplified Chinese: 菁桐煤矿纪念公园; pinyin: Jīngtóng Méikuàng Jìniàn Gōngyuán) is a former coal mine in Jingtong, Pingxi District, New Taipei, Taiwan.

== History ==
The area used to be the underground coal mining site. The coal used to be transported to the surface through an inclined tunnel.

== Transportation ==
The memorial park is accessible within walking distance north of Jingtong Station of Taiwan Railway.

== See also ==
- Mining in Taiwan
