= Keelung River =

River in northern Taiwan

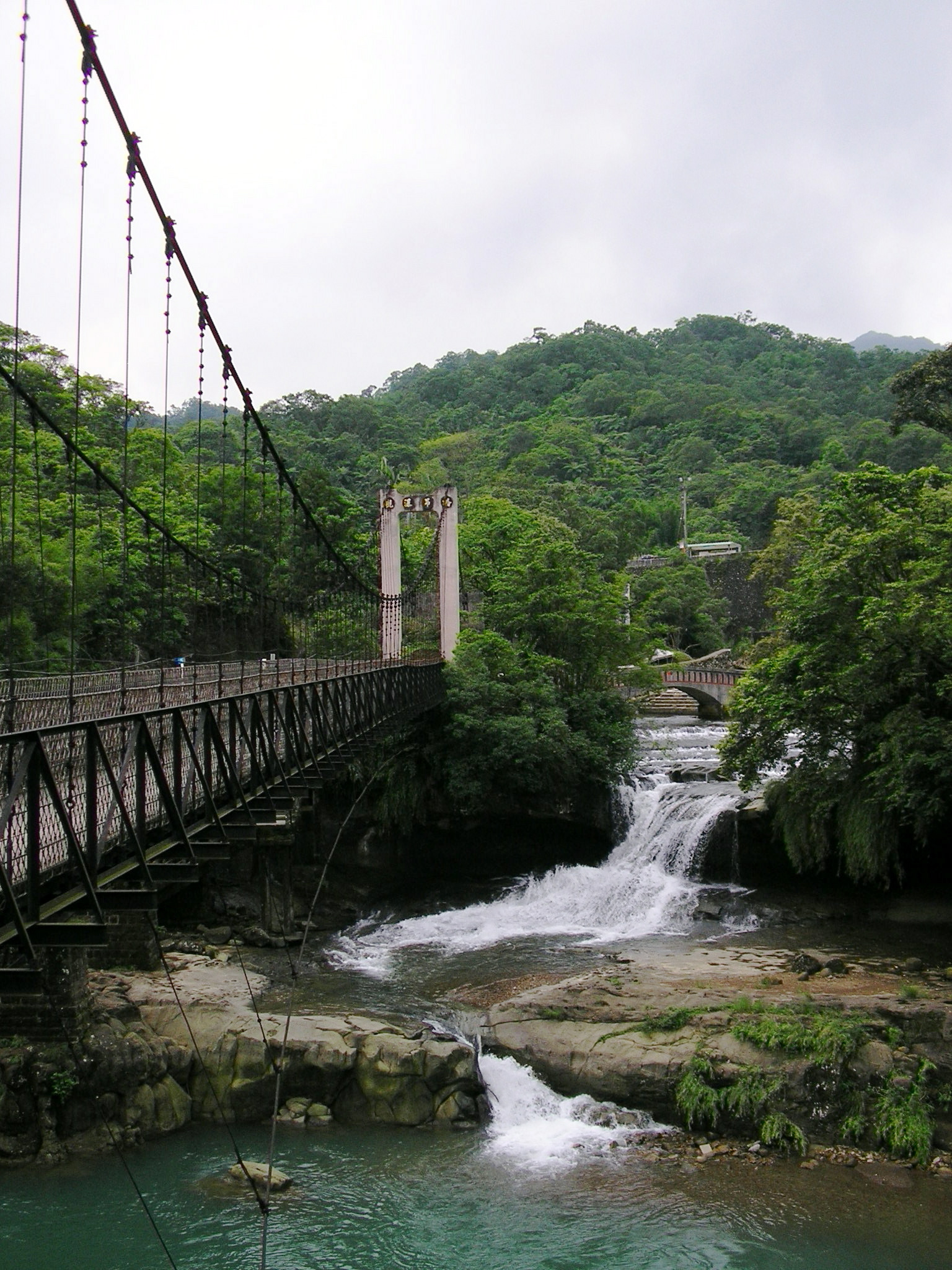
- Keelung River upstream
- Native name: 基隆河 (Chinese)

Location
- Country: Republic of China
- Province: Taiwan
- Cities: New Taipei, Taipei, Keelung

Physical characteristics
- Source
  - location: Huo Shao Liao Mountain (火燒寮山)
  - elevation: 560 m (1,840 ft)
- Mouth
  - location: Tamsui River
  - coordinates: 25°06′41″N 121°27′51″E
- Length: 86.4 km (53.7 mi)
- Basin size: 493 km^{2} (190 sq mi)

The Keelung River (Chinese: 基隆河; pinyin: Jīlóng Hé; Wade–Giles: Chi^{1}-lung^{2} Ho^{2}; Pe̍h-ōe-jī: Ke-lâng-hô) is a river in northern Taiwan.

The Keelung River originates in the mountains west-northwest of the town of Jingtong in Pingxi District, New Taipei City, flows down to a rift valley and then flows ENE to Sandiaoling. Then it flows northward to a point between Jiufen and Keelung City, and then heads back in a general WSW direction to Taipei, where it joins the Tamsui River and flows out to sea. The land around the Keelung river was rich in gold and coal, and many areas were mined.

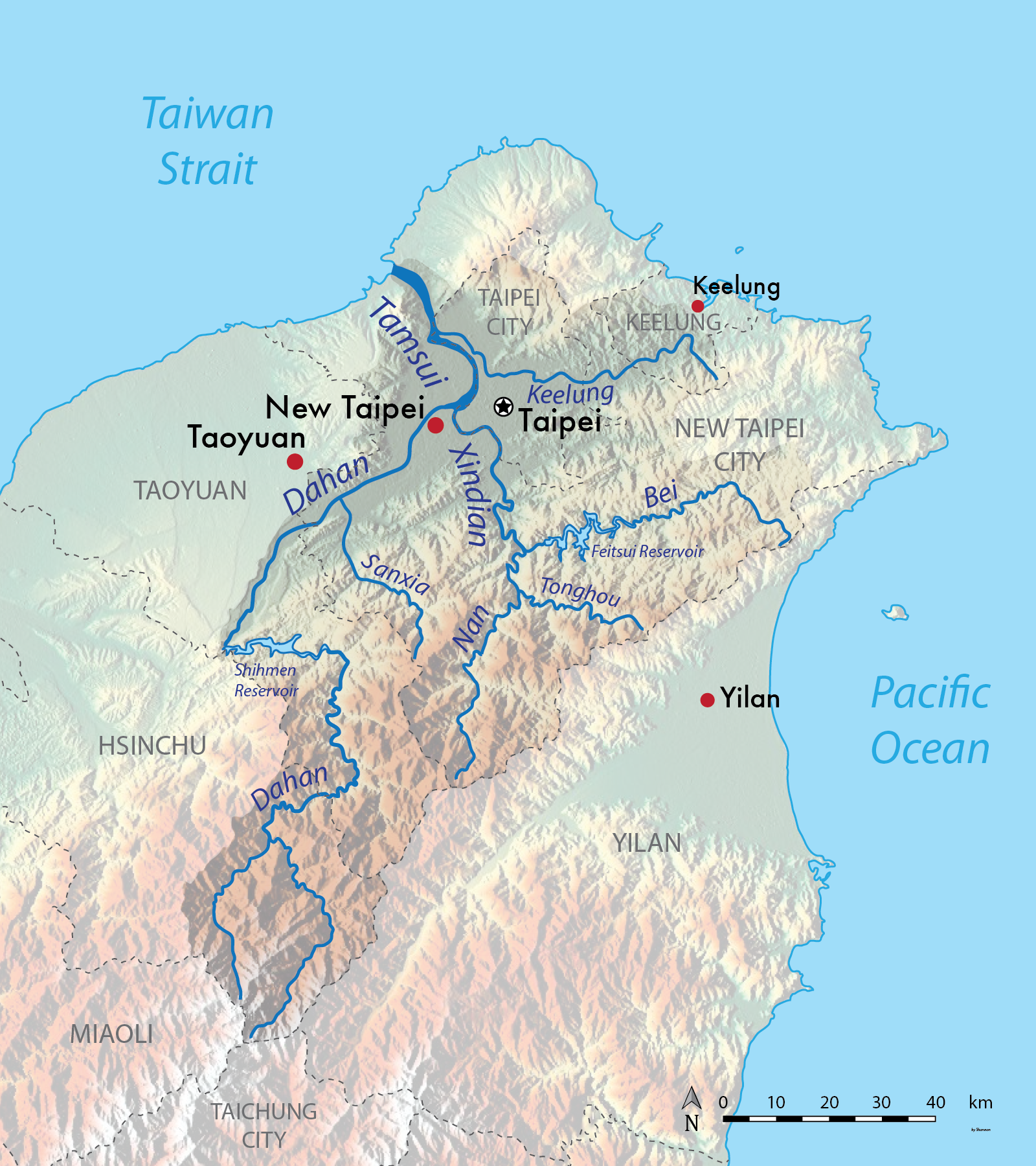
Map showing the location of the Keelung River within the Tamsui River watershed

== Geography ==
Park along the river is Dajia Riverside Park.

== Pollution ==
The Keelung River is heavily polluted by both raw sewage and industrial pollution from illegal industry. The restoration of the natural river is on the agenda of the Taipei City Government and several citizen organizations.

== Events ==
During the 1880s, the French general Jacques Duchesne fought the Keelung campaign in the river basin, defeating the Chinese.

On 4 February 2015, TransAsia Airways Flight 235, an ATR-72 operated by TransAsia Airways, crashed into the river, close to the Nanhu Bridge in Taipei, resulting in 43 fatalities and 17 injuries, including two on the ground.

== River straightening ==
In the second half of the 20th century, the Keelung river has undergone several manmade changes to reduce flooding and accommodate the growth of Taipei. These include the straightening of the river's path near the districts of Nangang, Neihu and Shilin.

== See also ==
- Geography of Taiwan
- Keelung Nuannuan pothole
- Shifen Waterfall
