= Pingxi line =

Railway line in Taiwan

Pingxi Line
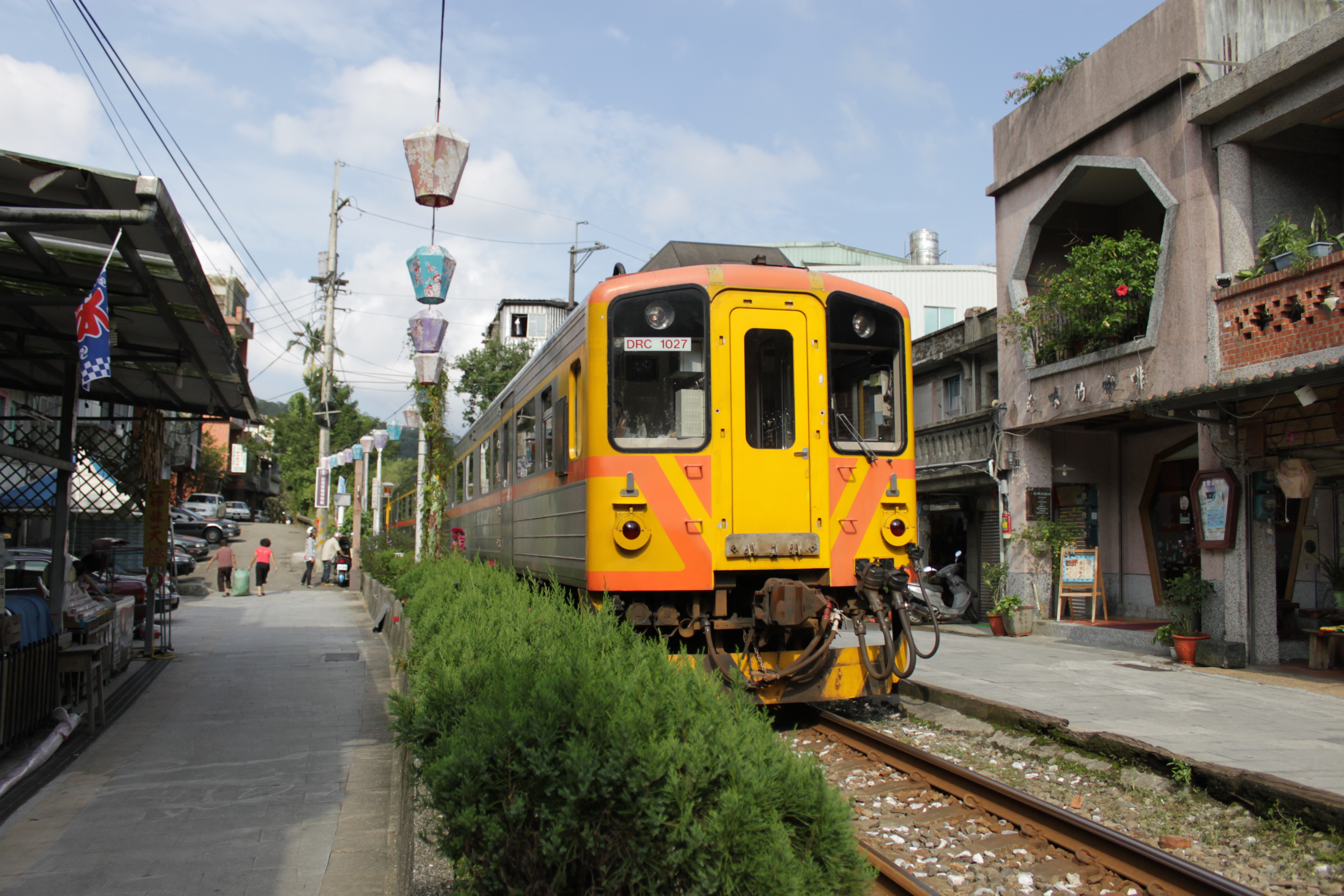

Overview
- Native name: 平溪線
- Owner: Taiwan Railway Corporation
- Termini: Sandiaoling; Jingtong
- Stations: 7

Service
- Operator: Taiwan Railway Corporation

History
- Opened: July 1921

Technical
- Line length: 12.9 km (8.0 mi)

The Pingxi Line (Chinese: 平溪線; pinyin: Píngxī Xiàn; Wade–Giles: P'ing^{²}-hsi^{¹} Hsien^{⁴}; Pe̍h-ōe-jī: Pêng-khe Soàⁿ) is a 12.9 km long, single-track railway branch line of the Taiwan Railway. It runs through Ruifang and Pingxi districts in New Taipei City.

== History ==
The railroad was originally built to transport coal. It was completed in July 1921, during Japanese rule.

== Services ==
All trains have through service to the Yilan Line. Most terminate at either Houtong or Ruifang. Other trains go as far as Badu.

Today passenger services are operated on the line by Nippon Sharyo built Diesel Multiple Units.

== Stations ==
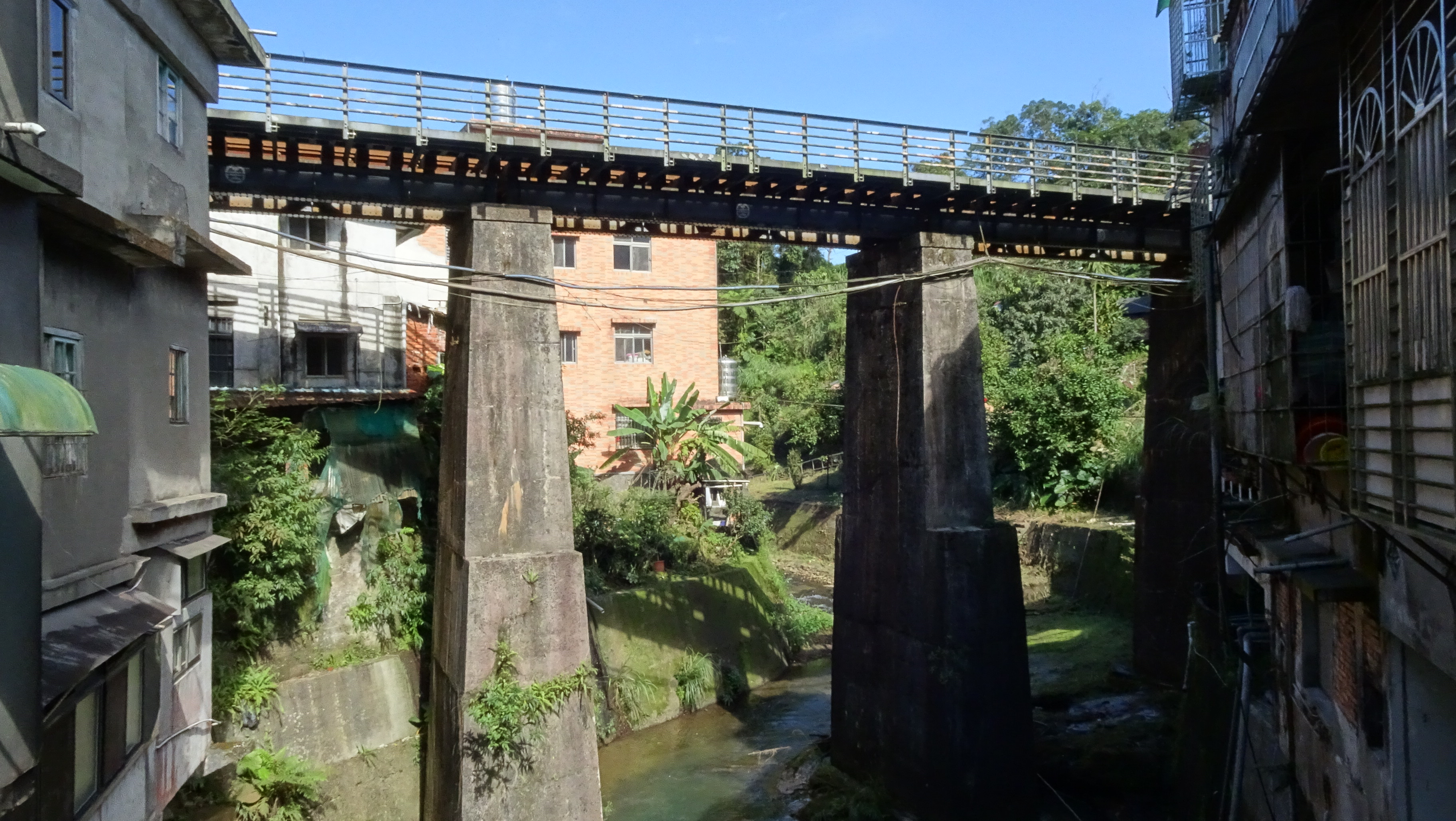
Bridge of Pingxi Line crossing Sankeng Creek

| Name | Chinese | Taiwanese | Hakka | Transfers and notes | Location | |
|---|---|---|---|---|---|---|
| Sandiaoling | 三貂嶺 | Sam-tiau-niá | Sâm-tiau-liâng | → Yilan line | Ruifang | New Taipei |
| Dahua | 大華 | Tāi-hôa | Thai-fà | | Pingxi | New Taipei |
| Shifen | 十分 | Cha̍p-hūn | Sṳ̍p-fûn | | Pingxi | New Taipei |
| Wanggu | 望古 | Bāng-kó͘ | Mong-kú | | Pingxi | New Taipei |
| Lingjiao | 嶺腳 | Niá-kha | Liâng-kiok | | Pingxi | New Taipei |
| Pingxi | 平溪 | Pêng-khe | Phìn-hâi | | Pingxi | New Taipei |
| Jingtong | 菁桐 | Chheⁿ-tông | Chiâng-thùng | | Pingxi | New Taipei |

== Gallery ==
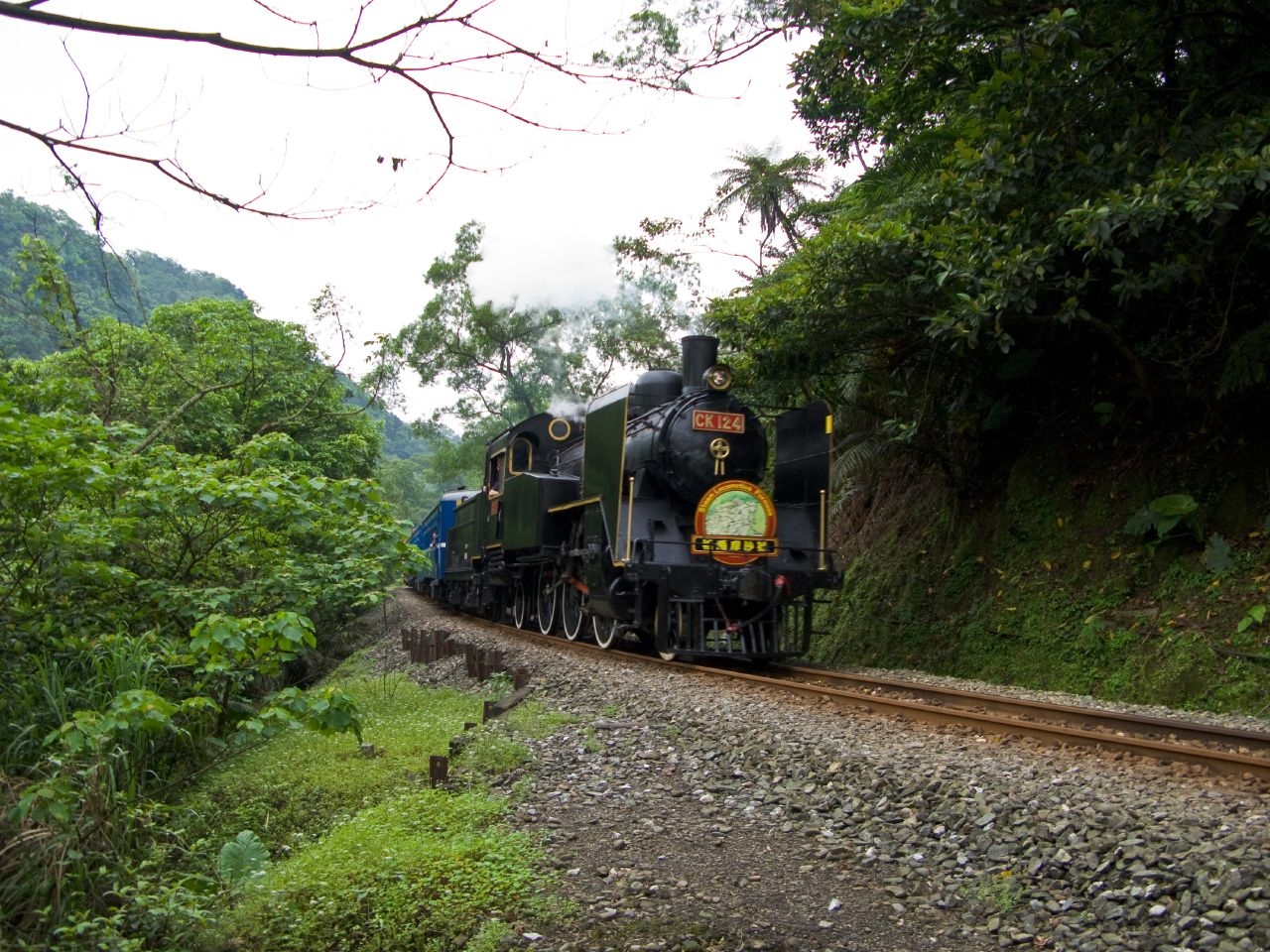
TRA steam logo CK124 running on the Pingsi line

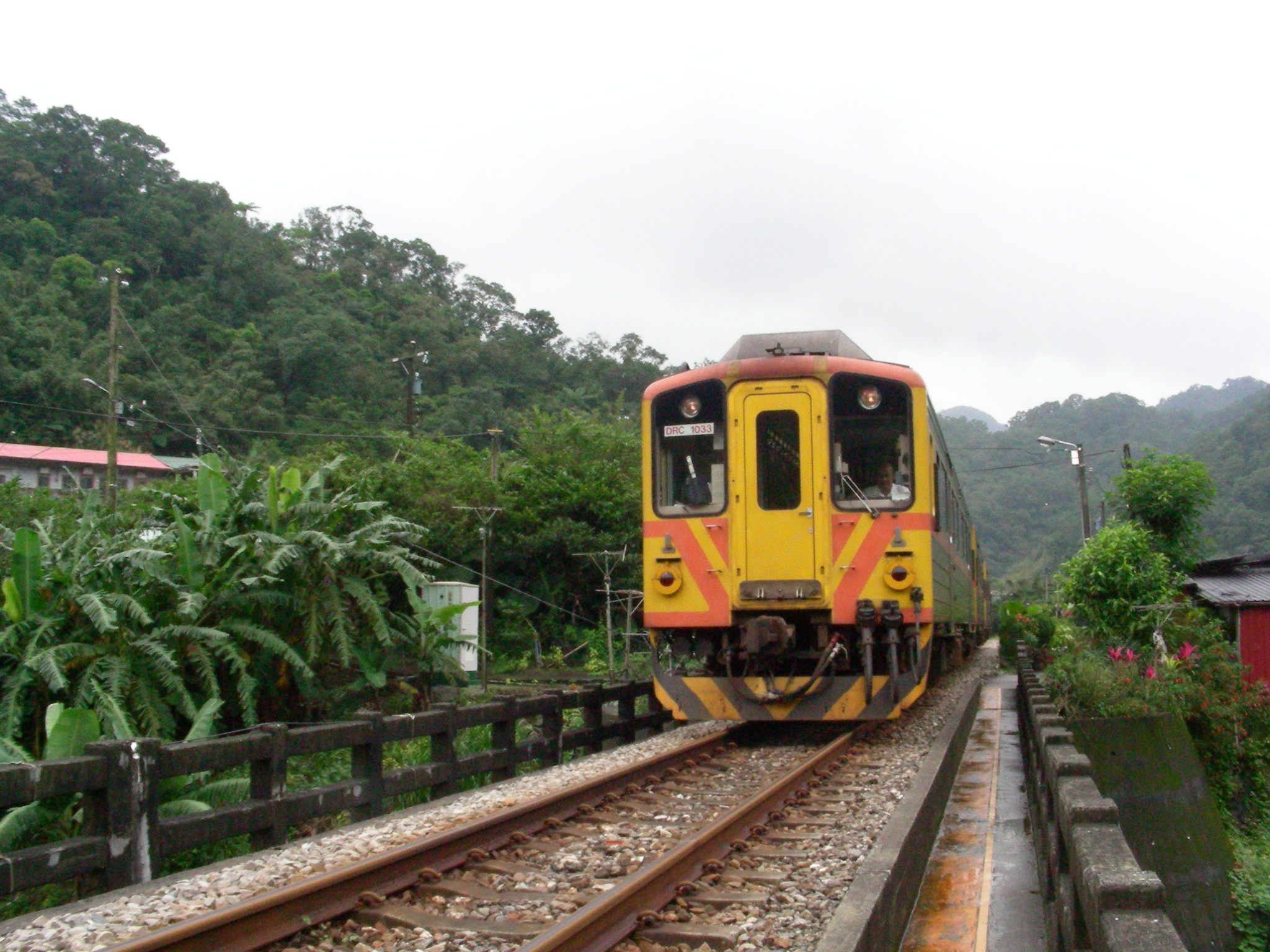
DR1000 on the Pingsi line

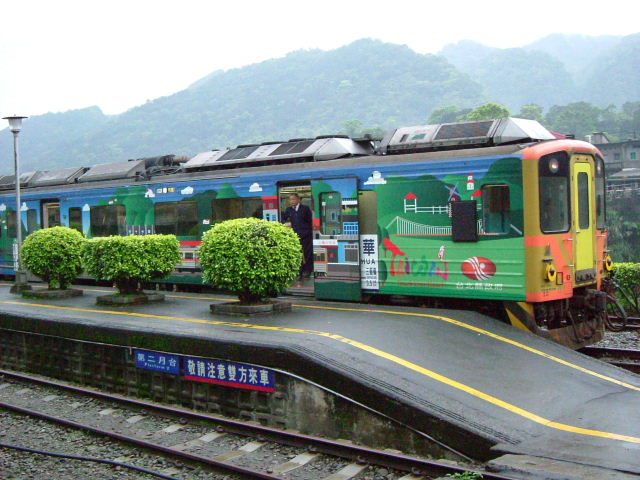
Colour promotional livery for DR1000

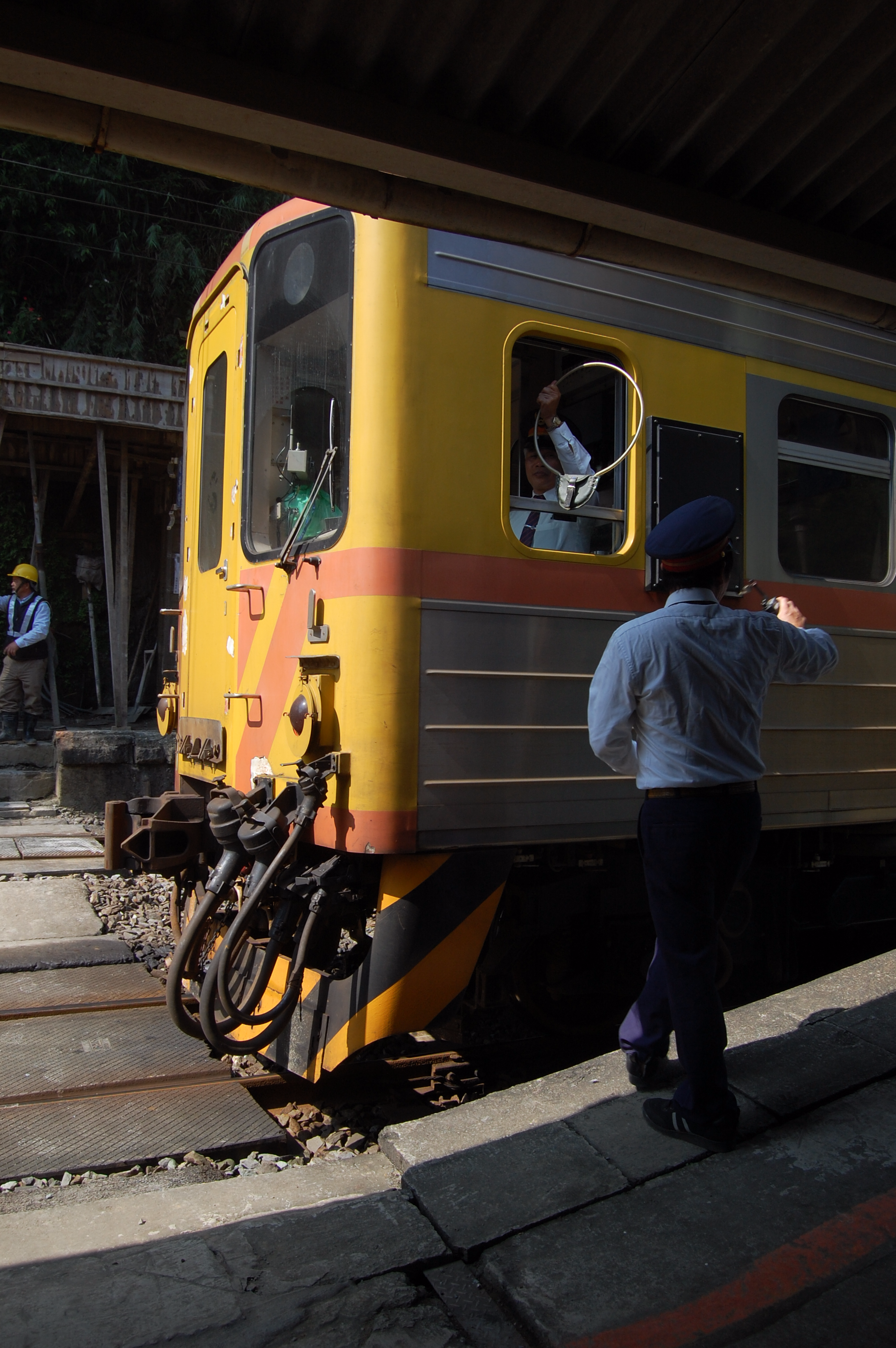
TRA personnel receiving a token (staff) to provide movement authority at Sandiaoling for the next segment to Shifen

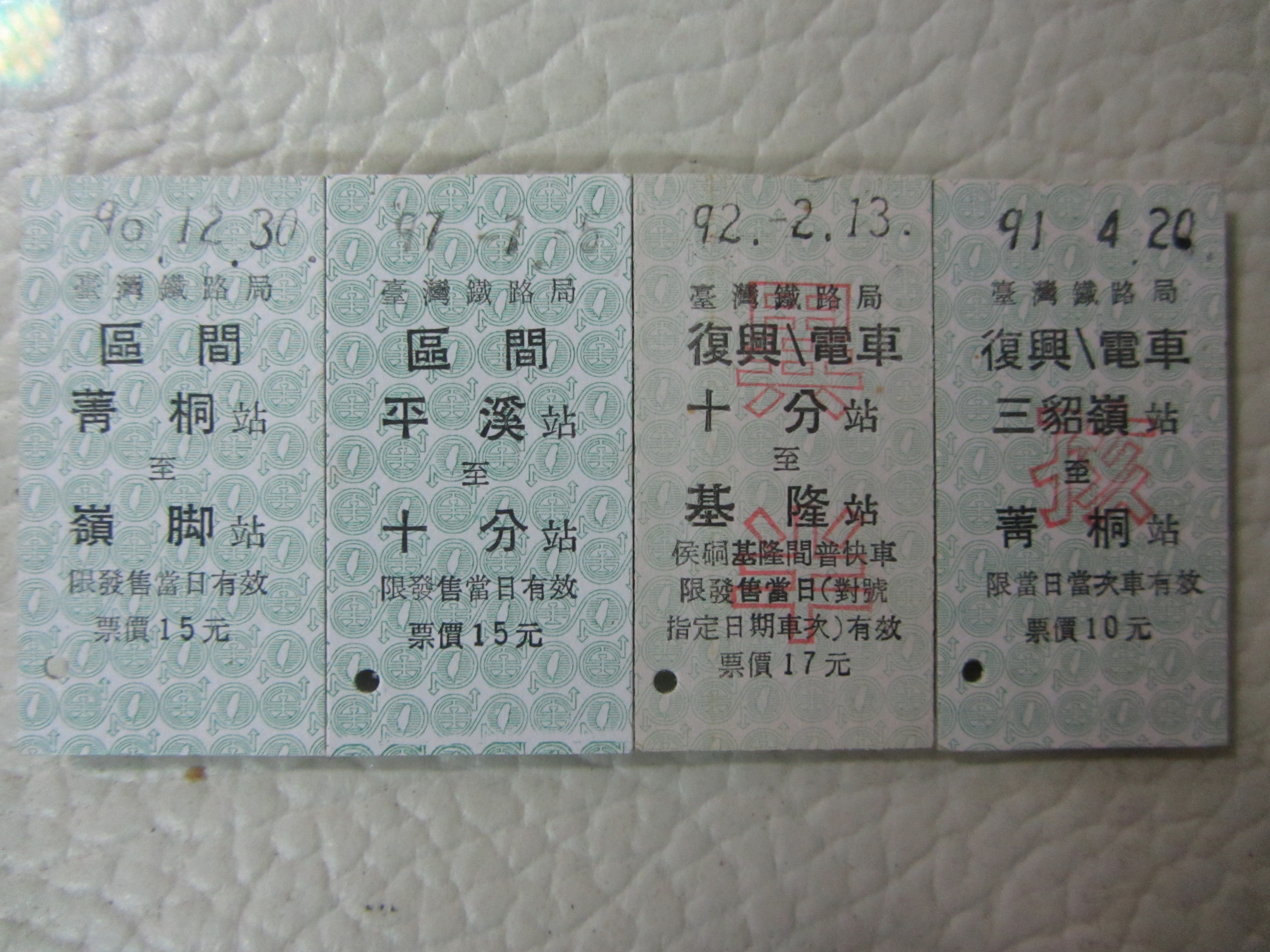
Pingsi line Edmondson ticket
