= Jingtong railway station =

Railway station located in New Taipei City, Taiwan

Jingtong Station 菁桐車站
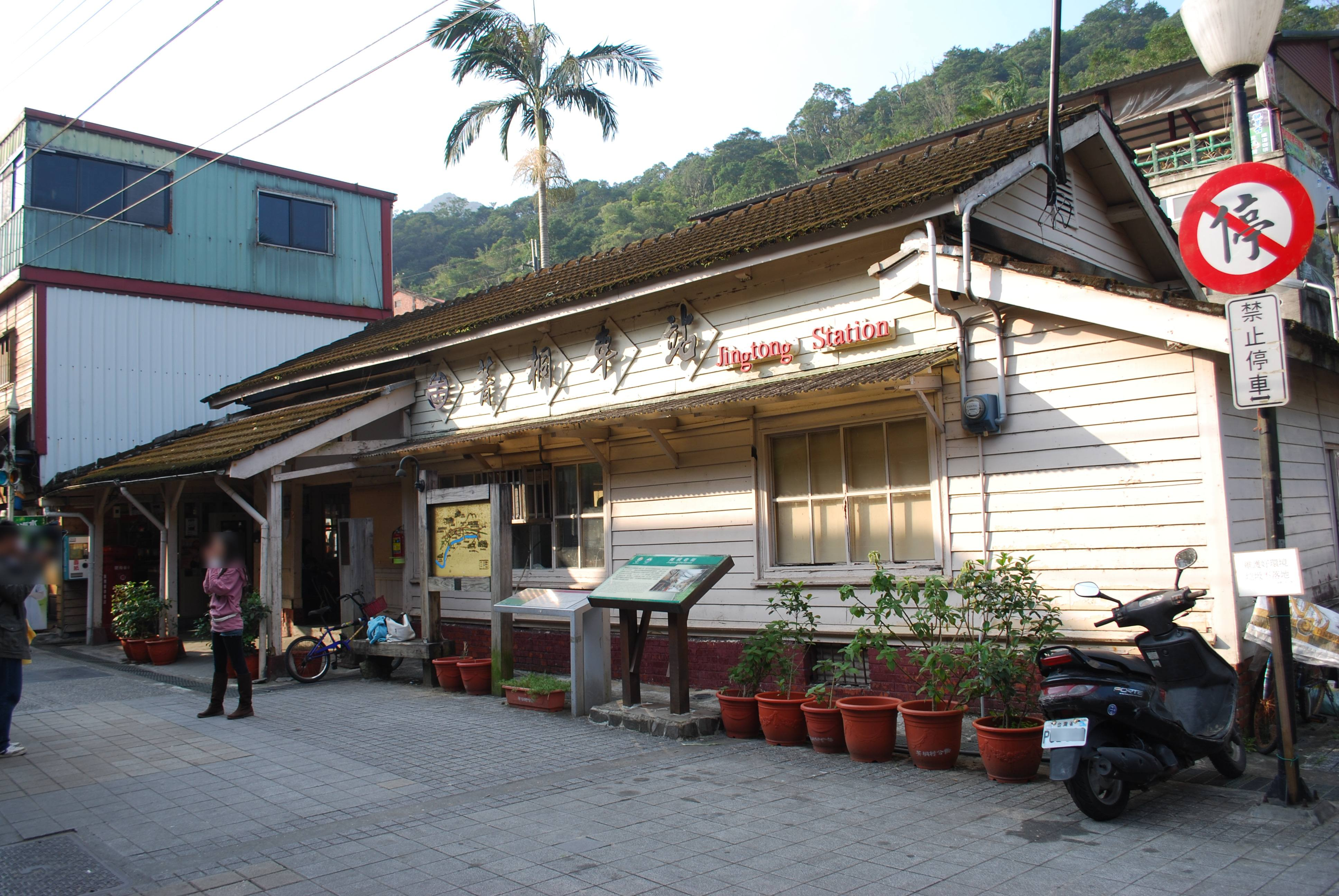

Chinese name
- Traditional Chinese: 菁桐車站
Transcriptions
Standard Mandarin
- Hanyu Pinyin: Jīngtóng Chēzhàn
- Bopomofo: ㄐㄧㄥ ㄊㄨㄥˊ ㄔㄜ ㄓㄢˋ

General information
- Location: Pingxi, New Taipei, Taiwan
- Coordinates: 25°01′25.1″N 121°43′26.0″E
- System: Taiwan Railway railway station
- Line: Pingxi line
- Distance: 12.9 km to Sandiaoling
- Platforms: 1 side platform

Construction
- Structure type: At-grade

Other information
- Station code: 236

History
- Opened: 1 October 1929

Passengers
- 2017: 404,712 per year
- Rank: 91

Services
Preceding station	Taiwan Railway	Following station
Pingxi towards Sandiaoling	Pingxi line	Terminus
Location

Jingtong railway station (Chinese: 菁桐車站; pinyin: Jīngtóng Chēzhàn) is a railway station located in Pingxi District, New Taipei, Taiwan. It is located on the Pingxi line and is operated by the Taiwan Railway. It serves Jingtong, an old coal-mining town and popular tourist attraction.

== Around the station ==
- Jingtong Coal Memorial Park

== In popular culture ==
- The station was used as a filming location for Bad Girls (2012).
