= Sandiaoling railway station =

Railway station in Ruifang, New Taipei, Taiwan

Sandiaoling 三貂嶺車站
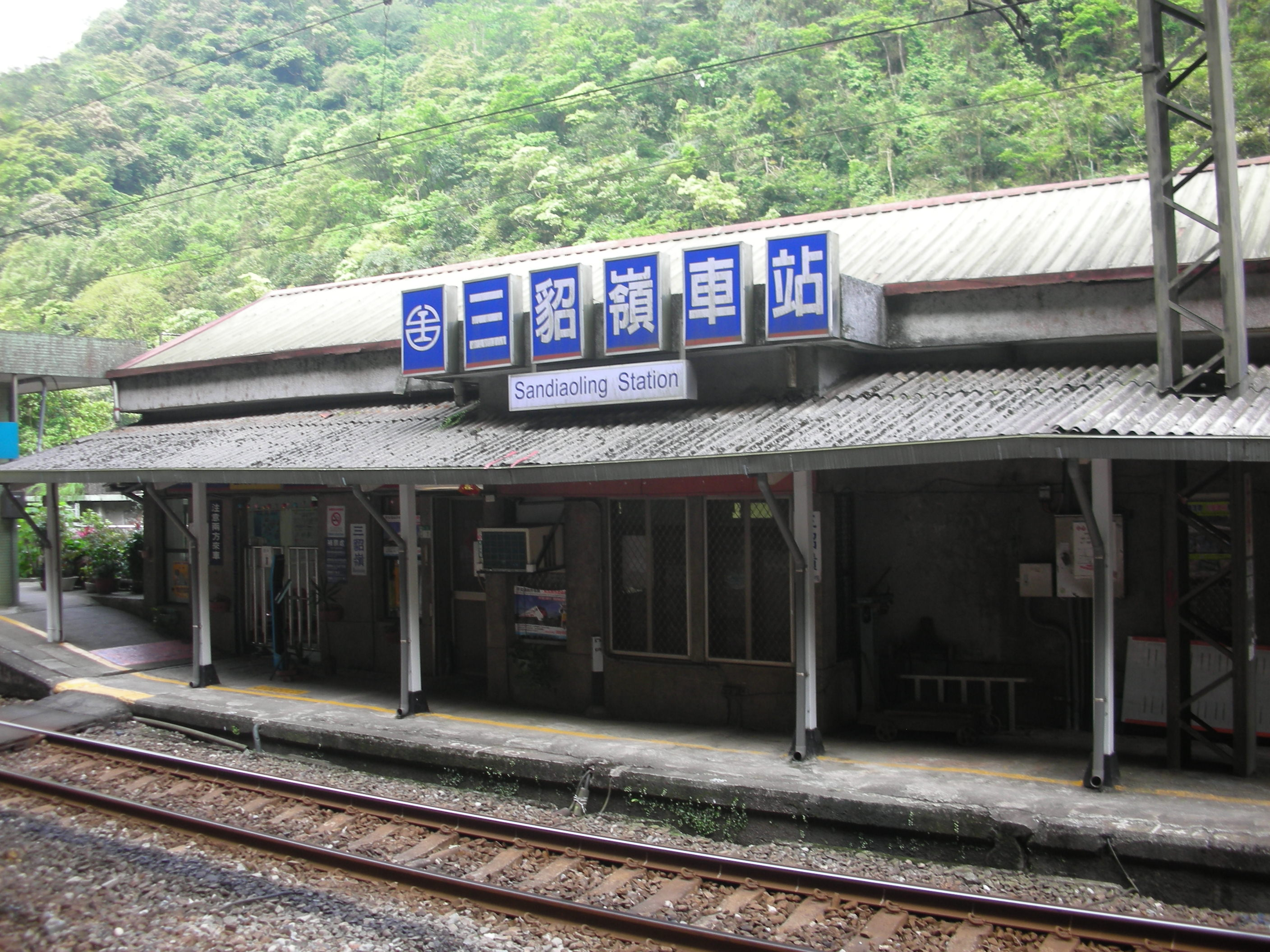

General information
- Location: Ruifang, New Taipei, Taiwan
- Coordinates: 25°03′57.3″N 121°49′21.5″E
- System: Taiwan Railway railway station
- Owner: Taiwan Railway Corporation
- Operator: Taiwan Railway Corporation
- Lines: Yilan line Pingxi line
- Train operators: Taiwan Railway Corporation

History
- Opened: 16 May 1922

Passengers
- 348 daily (2024)

Services
Preceding station	Taiwan Railway	Following station
Houtong towards Badu	Eastern Trunk line	Mudan towards Taitung
Terminus	Pingxi line	Dahua towards Jingtong
Location

Sandiaoling railway station (Chinese: 三貂嶺車站; pinyin: Sāndiāolǐng Chēzhàn) is a railway station of Taiwan Railway located in Ruifang District, New Taipei, Taiwan. It is located on the Yilan line and is the terminus of the Pingxi line.

The station is the only station in Taiwan not connected to a public road.

== See also ==
- List of railway stations in Taiwan
