= Noro =

Noro may refer to:

== People ==
=== French ===
- Line Noro (1900–1985), French stage and film actress
- Stéphane Noro (born 1979), French footballer

=== Japanese ===
- Akihiko Noro (野呂 昭彦; 1946) Japanese politician
- Eitaro Noro (野呂 榮太郎; 1900–1934), Japanese economic historian
- Issei Noro (野呂一生; born 1957), Japanese jazz fusion guitarist
- Kageyoshi Noro (野呂 景義; 1854–1923), Japanese metallurgist
- Kayo Noro (野呂 佳代; Born 1983), Japanese singer and entertainer
- Masamichi Noro (野呂 昌道; 1935–2013), Japanese aikido master
- Tatsuhito Noro (野呂 竜比人; born 1988), Japanese basketball player

=== Other ===
- Francesco Noro (1871–1947), Italian painter
- Miguel Ángel Noro (born 1961), Bolivian footballer
- Norberto "Noro" Morales (1911–1964), Puerto Rican pianist

== Places ==
- Noro, Solomon Islands
- Noro Island, Spain; see Isla de Noro in the Spanish language Wikipedia
- Mount Noro, Japan

== Other uses ==
- Noro, priestesses within the Magiri system of the Ryukyu Kingdom in the Ryukyu Islands
- "Noro", a song on the 2009 album Daisy by Brand New

== See also ==
- Eisaku Noro Company, a Japanese manufacturer of color-transitioning yarn
- Mount Noro Speed Park
- Noro–Frenkel law of corresponding states
- Norovirus
- Norro (disambiguation)
