= Jinquan Temple =

Coordinates: 25.111461°N 121.854344°E

- 金瓜石金泉寺
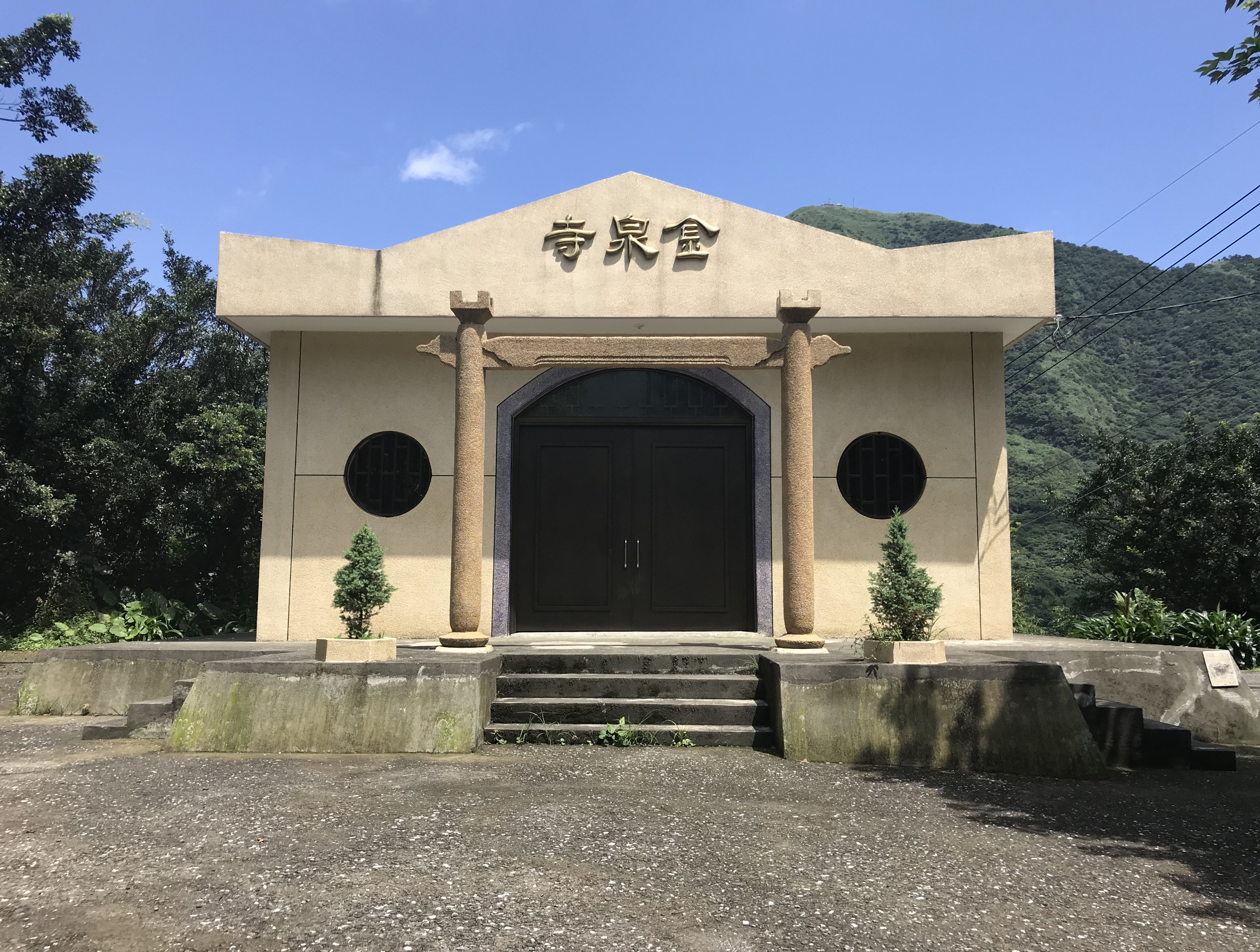

Religion
- Affiliation: Pure Land

Location
- Location: Shishan Village, Ruifang, New Taipei, Taiwan
- Interactive map of Jinquan Temple

Architecture
- Established: 1905; 121 years ago

Jinquan Temple (Chinese: 金瓜石金泉寺), formerly known as Jinguashi Temple or Kinkaseki Hongan-ji, is a Pure Land Buddhist temple located in Shishan, Ruifang, New Taipei, Taiwan. It was established to commemorate miners from Pingyang, Rui’an, Yuhuan and other counties of the former Wenzhou Prefecture in Zhejiang who came to work in Jinguashi during the period of Japanese rule in Taiwan. The temple is currently listed as a historic building.

== History ==
In 1905, in order to provide assistance and funeral arrangements for injured or deceased employees, the second generation mining entrepreneur Tanaka Chōbei established a Pure Land sect missionary station. After 1913, however, the station no longer had a resident missionary. It was subsequently converted into a missionary station of the Ōtani branch of Shin Buddhism, and later developed into a formal temple, commonly known as the Kinkaseki Hongan-ji (traditional Chinese and Japanese: 金瓜石本願寺; simplified Chinese: 金瓜石本愿寺).

Between 1931 and 1935, Japan Mining expanded its gold mining operations in Jinguashi and recruited more than 2,500 workers from China. Among them were over 300 workers from Pingyang, Rui’an, Yuqiao and other counties of Wenzhou Prefecture in Zhejiang. In Ruifang, there is still a place name known as Wenzhouliao, meaning Wenzhou settlement. Workers were also recruited from Fuzhou.

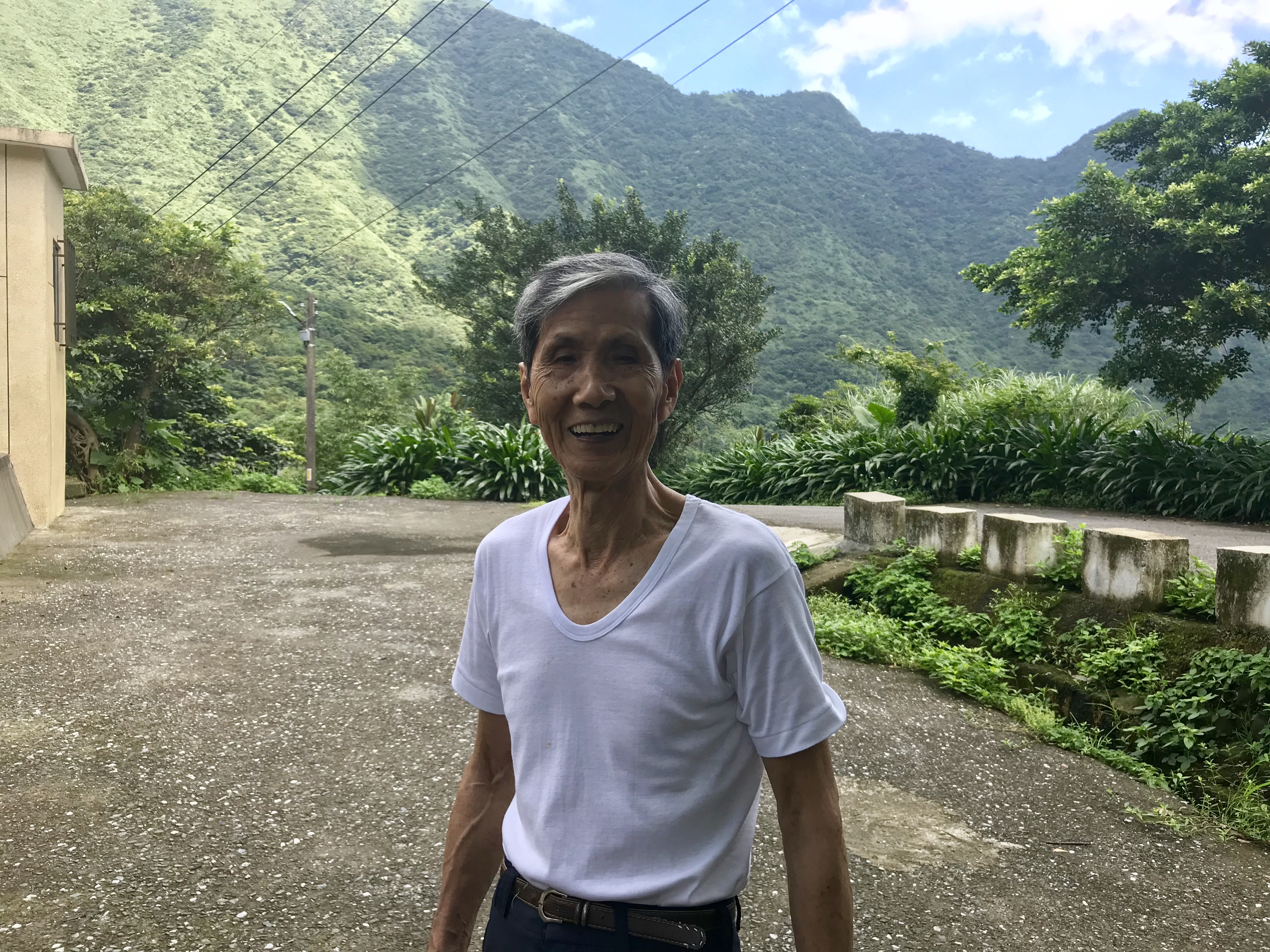
Chen Shicheng, a retired local miner in 2019

According to Chen Shicheng, a retired local miner, working conditions in the early years were extremely poor. Masks were not provided, and miners frequently developed silicosis. At that time, there was a missionary station established by the Japanese Pure Land sect, known as Jinguashi Temple (Chinese and Japanese: 金瓜石寺).

Japan Mining constructed the first electrified crematorium in Ruifang beneath the temple, specifically for cremating miners who died in accidents or from illness. Its scale at the time surpassed that of neighbouring Keelung. The Japanese also recruited Wenzhou workers in Keelung as coal labourers, building dormitories for them on the hillside of Renzheng Village. The area became known as Wenzhouliao (traditional Chinese: 溫州寮; simplified Chinese: 温州寮) and has since been redeveloped into the Renzheng Public Housing Community.

After the Marco Polo Bridge Incident in 1937, routes for these workers to return home were cut off, and many died in Taiwan. The ashes of miners in Jinguashi who had no relatives to arrange their affairs were placed in the basement of the temple. After the war, Jinguashi Temple was renamed Jinquan Temple and taken over by the Taiwan Metal Mining Company (TMMC). A total of forty seven sets of remains were later claimed by Japanese and some Zhejiang families.

During the post war period, some people continued to come from Wenzhou to Ruifang to work as miners. Others from Wenzhou opened a barber's shop at No. 148, Qitang Old Street in Jinguashi, or operated a tea house at the Jinguashi Prisoner of War Camp. On 27 July 1958, Wenzhou people in Taiwan established the Taipei Wenzhou Association at the Taipei Public Hall. In the same year, they began providing relief to impoverished fellow townspeople residing in Taipei City and County.

In 1969, the Japanese government dispatched personnel to Taiwan to repatriate all the remains of Japanese miners. After this relocation, 206 urns remained in storage, the vast majority belonging to Wenzhou people. In 1987, following the closure of TMMC, Jinquan Temple was left unmanaged and the site became overgrown with weeds.

In 1992, the ninth board of directors and supervisors of the Taipei Wenzhou Association resolved to erect a memorial stele at Jinquan Temple and renovate the cemetery. Notices were published in newspapers seeking surviving family members, but owing to the long lapse of time, almost no one responded. The association, together with Wu Qianci, head of the Shishan Village, Chen Aren and others, initiated fundraising efforts for restoration, and the local community also responded by organising Zhongyuan memorial rites.

From 1999 onwards, local residents began holding regular memorial ceremonies and systematically cataloguing the urns. In September 1999, residents from Shishan, Xinshan, Tongshan and Guashan gather at the temple to participate in the universal salvation ritual. With the assistance of successive village heads, including Zhang Wenrong, the Taiwan Sugar Corporation, which was responsible for managing the temple, agreed to lease a plot of land for the erection of a memorial stele.

On 3 September 2002, Chen Lizhong, chairman of the Taipei Wenzhou Association, led more than 30 members in establishing the “Memorial Stele for Wenzhou Miners Who Died in the Jinguashi Mines”. The inscription recounts the history of Wenzhou workers who came to labour there. At the initiative of Wu Ganzheng, head of Shishan Village, local residents cleared the pathways that had become overgrown and buried in dense vegetation. Preliminary clearance work was completed on 18 October 2003.

On 28 June 2018, the Cultural Affairs Department of the New Taipei City Government, together with representatives including Su Youde, director of Councillor Lin Yi-chi's service office, Village Head Wu Ganzheng and local elders, conducted a site inspection at the temple. They discussed the possibility of designating both the temple and the crematorium below it as cultural heritage of New Taipei City. After more than a year of investigation and follow up, the New Taipei City Government listed Jinquan Temple as a provisionally designated historic monument.

== See also ==
- Wenzhou people
- List of tourist attractions in Taiwan
