= Norrö =

Norrö may refer to:

- Norrö, Österåker Municipality, a locality situated in Österåker Municipality, Stockholm County, Sweden
- Norrö, Värmdö Municipality, an island in the Stockholm archipelago and in Värmdö Municipality, Stockholm County, Sweden
