= Ōgon Shrine =

Shinto shrine in Jinguashi, New Taipei City, Taiwan

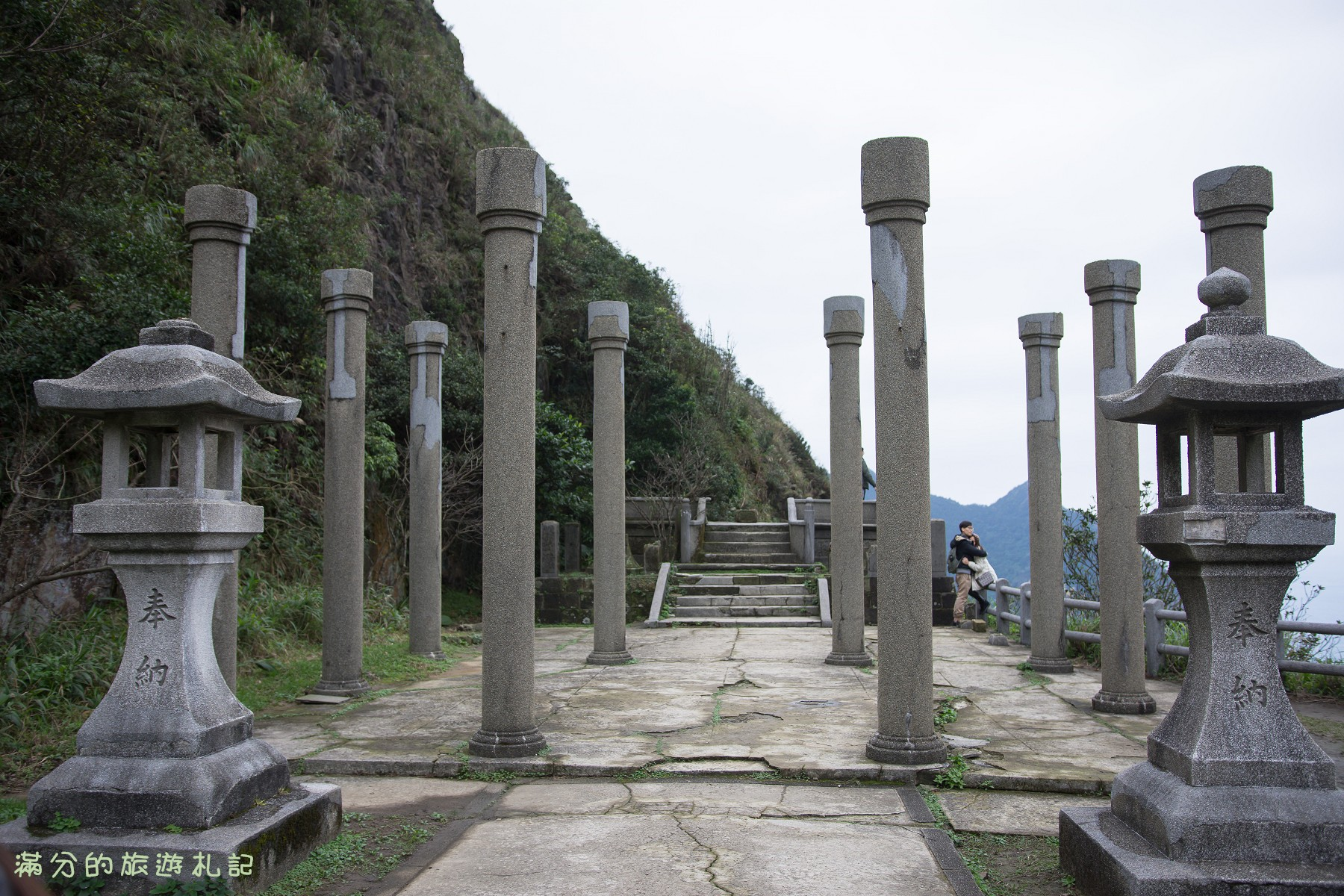
- Stone pillar remains of the Honden (Main Hall).

- Taiwan

Location
- Location: Ruifang, New Taipei, Taiwan
- State: Taiwan
- Country: Japan
- Interactive map of Ōgon Shrine
- Coordinates: 25°6′17.8″N 121°51′31.3″E

Architecture
- Type: Shinto shrine
- Founder: Tanaka Chōbei
- Established: 2 March 1898

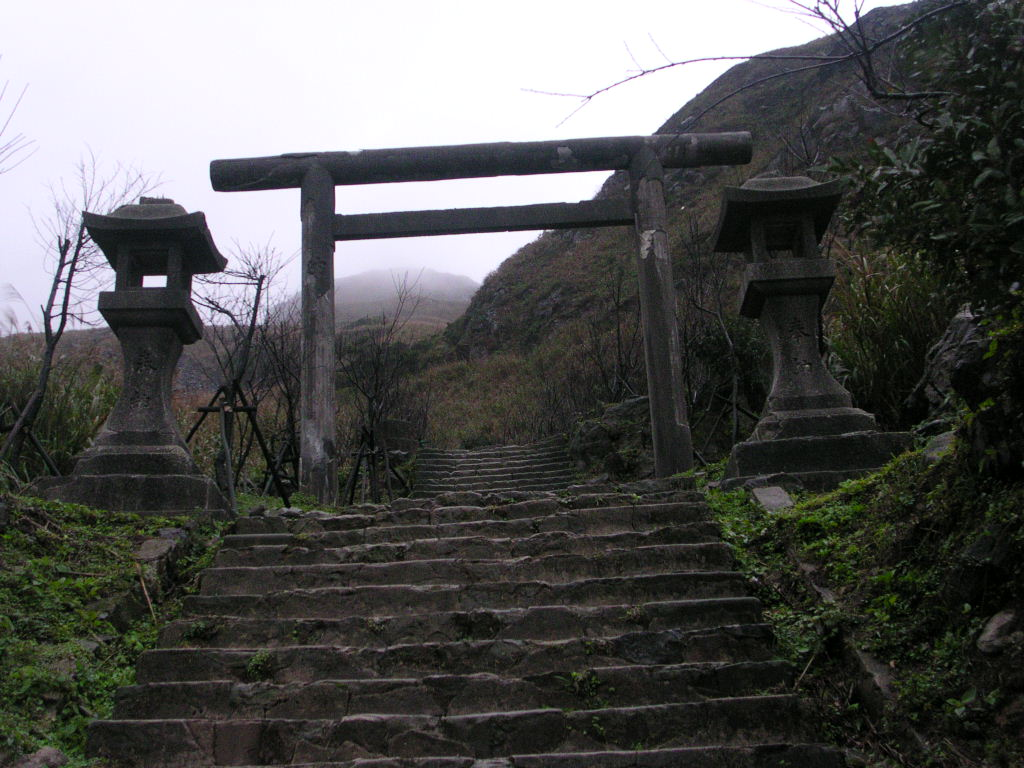
Torii Gate and Stone Tōrō Lanterns on the Sandō Path leading to the shrine.

The Ōgon Shrine (黄金神社, Ōgon Jinja) also known as the Jinguashi Shinto Shrine, Gold Temple or Spirits of the Mountain Shrine (山神社, yama jinja) is a Shinto shrine located halfway up a mountain in the Gold Ecological Park in Jinguashi, Ruifang District, New Taipei City, Taiwan (formerly Kinkaseki, Zuihō town, Kirun district, Taihoku Prefecture during Japanese rule).

Kinkaseki town (now Jinguashi) at the time of Japanese rule was said to have been the number one gold mine town in Asia. The Ōgon Shrine was built and managed on March 2, 1898 (Meiji 31) by Tanaka Chōbei (田中長兵衛), who started the iron industry for the first time in Japan and had the mining rights of the Kinkaseki Mine.

Ōkuninushi no Mikoto (大国主命), Kanayamahiko no Mikoto (金山彦命), and Sarutahiko no Mikoto (猿田彦命) were enshrined as the three Kami spirits of metallurgy (冶金の守護神, yakin no shugoshin). During Japanese rule, a grand matsuri was held every year and the mine workers and nearby residents gathered together to celebrate.

Originally, there was a Honden Main Hall, haiden, Temizuya Purification Pavilion, and Sandō Path leading to the shrine. Along the path were three Torii Gates, five flag banner platforms, one copper bull, and ten pairs of stone Tōrō lanterns. After World War II when the Japanese left Taiwan, the shrine was destroyed by vandals and only the stone pillars of the Honden, two Torii Gates, and four pair of stone Tōrō lanterns remain today.

== See also ==
- Gold Museum (Taiwan)
- List of Shinto shrines in Taiwan
