= Norro =

Norro may refer to:

== In Sweden ==
- Norrö, Österåkers Municipality, in Österåker Municipality

== People ==
- Norro Wilson (1938–2017), stage name for Norris Denton Wilson, American country music singer-songwriter

== See also ==
- Noro (disambiguation)
