= Yawata Steel Works dam collapse =

1916 disaster in Fukuoka, Japan

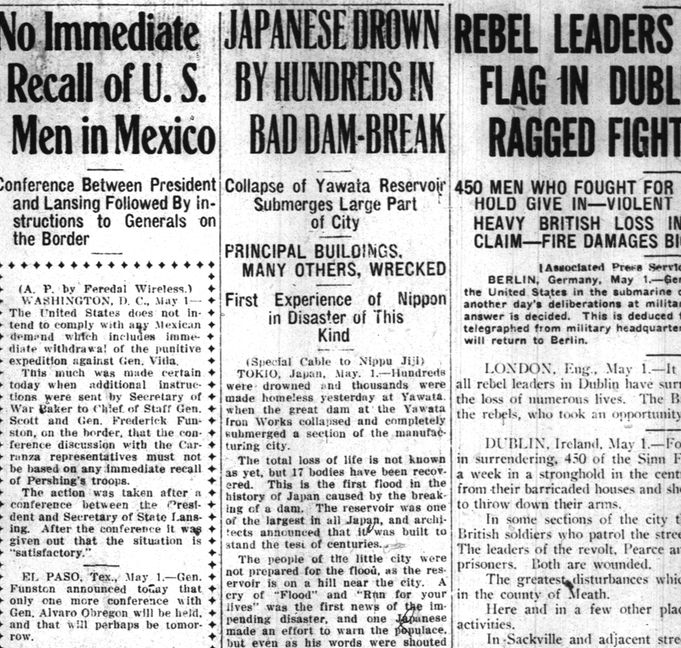
- File:Japanese drown by hundreds in bad dam-break
- Date: 1 May 1916
- Location: Yahata, Fukuoka, Japan
- Deaths: 100s

Yawata Steel Works dam collapse occurred on May 1, 1916 in Yahata, Fukuoka when the Great Dam collapsed killing hundreds and crushing thousands of homes.

== Background ==
By 1912, 80% of Japan's pig iron production was from Yawata Steel Works. An integrated mill with coke, iron, and steel facilities, Yahata was also responsible at this time for 80-90% of Japan's steel output. Energy efficiency was greatly improved by the conversion from steam to electricity as a power source, resulting in a drop in consumption of coal per ton of steel produced from four tons in 1920 to 1.58 in 1933. Much of the iron ore was from China and Korea. To supply the energy to the Steelworks a large dam was created.

The factories covered many acres and a town sprang up nearby, Yahata, Fukuoka to supply the workers.

== Dam break ==
On May 1, 1916, American media reported that the "Great Dam" at the Yawata Steel Works had collapsed and completely submerged a section of the manufacturing city. Initial reports stated that hundreds of people were killed and thousands made homeless. The army was sent in to help with the recovery.

== See also ==
- Kawachi Dam finished 1927
- Aburagi Dam finished 1971

== Bibliography ==
Notes

References

- "Japanese drown by hundreds in bad dam-break". Honolulu Star-Bulletin. Honolulu, Hawaii: Joseph B. Atherton. 1916. pp. 1–16. ISSN 2326-1137. OCLC 8807359.
- Iida, Ken'ichi (June 15, 2012). "The Iron and Steel Industry" (PDF). Japan External Trade Organization. pp. 455 ff. Archived from the original (PDF) on February 12, 2013.
- Inkster, Ian (2001). Japanese Industrialisation: Historical and Cultural Perspectives. Psychology Press. ISBN 9780415244442. - Total pages: 324
- The Japan Chronicle (1916). "Dam Burst".
- Shimizu, Norikazu (2010). "The Establishment of the State-Owned Yahata Steel Works (1)" (PDF). Journal of Business Economics. 16 (2). Kyushu International University: 132–5. Archived from the original (PDF) on January 26, 2016.
