= Largest cities in Japan by population by decade =

Geography list

This article lists the ten most populous cities in Japan by decade, starting after the Meiji Restoration of 1868. The first Japanese Census was not conducted until 1920, but other civilian and military population counts were carried out in the prior years between 1872 and 1918, and those form the source data for this article. When data is not available right on the turn of the decade, the closest year is used.

== 1873 ==
In 1868, the Meiji Restoration deposed the Tokugawa Shogunate and founded the Empire of Japan. Many major cities had lost population since the Tokugawa Era, as samurai left the former castle towns after the collapse of the military order.

Source data is from "Nihon Chishi Teiyo" (日本地誌提要, the Japanese Topographical Outline).

Rank	2010 Rank	Municipality	Current Prefecture	Population	Notes
1	1	Tokyo	Tokyo	595,905	Formerly known as Edo, its population is estimated to be over a million under the Tokugawa, but after the Meiji Restoration, roughly half the city's population emigrated. Nevertheless, Tokyo retained its position as Japan's largest city, which it had held since the mid 17th century.
2	3	Osaka	Osaka	271,992	
3	7	Kyoto	Kyoto	238,663	
4	4	Nagoya	Aichi	125,193	
5	35	Kanazawa	Ishikawa	109,685	
6	11	Hiroshima	Hiroshima	74,305	
7	2	Yokohama	Kanagawa	64,602	
8	55	Wakayama	Wakayama	61,124	
9	12	Sendai	Miyagi	51,998	
10	87	Tokushima	Tokushima	48,861	Tokushima's last appearance in the top ten, and last appearance of any municipality from the island of Shikoku.

== 1881 ==
Several major cities and towns actually lost population over the 1870s, as people continued to emigrate out of the former castle towns.

Source data is from the Fourth Joint Military-Government Report (第四回共武政表), a requisitioning document listing municipal populations and available resources and provisions.

Rank	2010 Rank	Municipality	Current Prefecture	Population	% Change	Notes
1	1	Tokyo	Tokyo	712,259	+ 19.53%	
2	3	Osaka	Osaka	292,636	+ 7.59%	
3	7	Kyoto	Kyoto	236,032	1.10%	
4	4	Nagoya	Aichi	117,401	6.22%	
5	35	Kanazawa	Ishikawa	108,328	1.24%	
6	11	Hiroshima	Hiroshima	74,950	+ 0.87%	
7	2	Yokohama	Kanagawa	72,630	+ 12.43%	
8	55	Wakayama	Wakayama	58,239	4.72%	Last appearance in the top ten.
9	12	Sendai	Miyagi	54,496	+ 4.80%	
10	6	Kobe	Hyogo	48,786	+ 19.32%	First appearance in the top ten.

== 1891 ==
In 1888, the government enacted a sweeping overhaul of the municipal government system, part of which involved a drastic program of municipality mergers. Overall, the "Great Meiji Mergers" cut the number of municipalities in Japan by more than three quarters, while dramatically increasing the size of many cities as they absorbed their surrounding towns and villages.

Source data is from the 1891 Imperial Japanese Registered Household Report (日本帝国民籍戸口表).

Rank	2010 Rank	Municipality	Current Prefecture	Population	% Change	Notes
1	1	Tokyo	Tokyo	1,161,800	+ 63.11%	Tokyo passed a million people, bringing the city back to its Tokugawa-era population level.
2	3	Osaka	Osaka	483,609	+ 65.26%	
3	7	Kyoto	Kyoto	297,527	+ 26.05%	
4	4	Nagoya	Aichi	179,174	+ 52.62%	
5	6	Kobe	Hyogo	142,965	+193.05%	
6	2	Yokohama	Kanagawa	132,627	+ 82.61%	
7	35	Kanazawa	Ishikawa	93,531	13.66%	Steadily decreasing in population since the Meiji Restoration.
8	11	Hiroshima	Hiroshima	90,154	+ 20.29%	
9	12	Sendai	Miyagi	64,476	+ 18.31%	
10	38	Nagasaki	Nagasaki	60,581	+ 89.32%	First appearance in the top ten, and first appearance of a city from the island of Kyushu since the Tokugawa Shogunate.

== 1898 ==
Source data is from the 1898 Imperial Japanese Population Statistics (日本帝国人口統計).

Rank	2010 Rank	Municipality	Current Prefecture	Population	% Change	Notes
1	1	Tokyo	Tokyo	1,440,121	+ 23.96%	
2	3	Osaka	Osaka	821,235	+ 69.81%	Osaka merged with its surrounding municipalities in 1897, increasing its size and population.
3	7	Kyoto	Kyoto	353,139	+ 18.69%	
4	4	Nagoya	Aichi	244,145	+ 36.26%	
5	6	Kobe	Hyogo	215,780	+ 50.93%	
6	2	Yokohama	Kanagawa	193,762	+ 46.10%	
7	11	Hiroshima	Hiroshima	122,306	+ 35.66%	
8	38	Nagasaki	Nagasaki	107,422	+ 77.32%	
9	35	Kanazawa	Ishikawa	83,662	10.55%	Kanazawa's population decreased for the third list in a row.
10	12	Sendai	Miyagi	83,325	+ 29.23%	Last appearance in the top ten until 1950.

== 1909 ==
Source data is from the 1908 Imperial Japanese Population Statistics (日本帝国人口統計).

Rank	2010 Rank	Municipality	Current Prefecture	Population	% Change	Notes
1	1	Tokyo	Tokyo	2,186,079	+ 51.80%	The first Japanese city to pass 2 million people.
2	3	Osaka	Osaka	1,226,647	+ 49.37%	The second Japanese city to pass 1 million people, after Edo/Tokyo.
3	7	Kyoto	Kyoto	442,462	+ 25.29%	
4	2	Yokohama	Kanagawa	394,303	+103.50%	Yokohama merged with its neighboring municipalities 1901, increasing its size and population.
5	4	Nagoya	Aichi	378,231	+ 54.92%	
6	6	Kobe	Hyogo	378,197	+ 75.27%	
7	38	Nagasaki	Nagasaki	176,480	+ 64.29%	
8	11	Hiroshima	Hiroshima	142,763	+ 16.73%	
9	35	Kanazawa	Ishikawa	110,994	+ 32.67%	Last appearance in the top ten.
10	95	Kure	Hiroshima	100,679	n/a	First appearance in the top ten. A brand new city, created in 1902 through the merger of smaller municipalities.

== 1920 ==
Source data is from the 1920 Census (国勢調査), the first formal census to be taken in Japan.

Rank	2010 Rank	Municipality	Current Prefecture	Population	% Change	Notes
1	1	Tokyo	Tokyo	2,173,201	0.59%	Tokyo's growth stalled throughout the 1920s.
2	3	Osaka	Osaka	1,252,983	+ 2.15%	
3	6	Kobe	Hyogo	608,644	+ 60.93%	
4	7	Kyoto	Kyoto	591,323	+ 33.64%	
5	4	Nagoya	Aichi	429,997	+ 13.69%	
6	2	Yokohama	Kanagawa	422,938	+ 7.26%	
7	38	Nagasaki	Nagasaki	176,534	+ 0.03%	
8	11	Hiroshima	Hiroshima	160,510	+ 12.43%	
9	81	Hakodate	Hokkaido	144,749	+ 64.67%	First appearance in the top ten, and first appearance of any city from Hokkaido.
10	94	Kure	Hiroshima	130,362	+ 29.48%	Last appearance in the top ten.

== 1930 ==
Source data is from the 1930 Census.

Rank	2010 Rank	Municipality	Current Prefecture	Population	% Change	Notes
1	3	Osaka	Osaka	2,453,973	+ 95.85%	Osaka merged with more surrounding municipalities in 1925, bringing the city to roughly its current size. The second Japanese city to pass 2 million people, and the new most populous city in Japan.
2	1	Tokyo	Tokyo	2,070,913	4.71%	Population briefly dipped below 2 million in the mid-1920s. For the first time since the early 17th century, Tokyo was no longer Japan's most populous city.
3	4	Nagoya	Aichi	907,404	+111.03%	
4	6	Kobe	Hyogo	787,616	+ 29.41%	
5	7	Kyoto	Kyoto	765,142	+ 29.39%	
6	2	Yokohama	Kanagawa	620,306	+ 46.67%	
7	11	Hiroshima	Hiroshima	270,417	+ 68.47%	
8	8	Fukuoka	Fukuoka	228,289	+139.30%	First appearance in the top ten.
9	38	Nagasaki	Nagasaki	204,626	+ 15.91%	Last appearance in the top ten.
10	81	Hakodate	Hokkaido	197,252	+ 36.27%	Last appearance in the top ten.

== 1940 ==
Source data is from the 1940 Census.

Rank	2010 Rank	Municipality	Current Prefecture	Population	% Change	Notes
1	1	Tokyo	Tokyo	6,778,804	+227.33%	Tokyo merged with its surrounding municipalities in 1932, radically increasing its size and population.
2	3	Osaka	Osaka	3,252,340	+ 32.53%	Osaka reached its peak population, becoming the second Japanese city to exceed 3 million people, alongside Tokyo. It has not yet surpassed its 1940 population.
3	4	Nagoya	Aichi	1,328,084	+ 46.36%	The third Japanese city with over a million people.
4	7	Kyoto	Kyoto	1,089,726	+ 42.42%	The fourth Japanese city with over a million people.
5	2	Yokohama	Kanagawa	968,091	+ 56.07%	
6	6	Kobe	Hyogo	967,234	+ 22.81%	
7	11	Hiroshima	Hiroshima	343,968	+ 27.20%	Last appearance in the top ten until 1960.
8	8	Fukuoka	Fukuoka	306,763	+ 34.37%	
9	9	Kawasaki	Kanagawa	300,777	+189.21%	First appearance in the top ten.
10	Nonexistent	Yahata	Fukuoka	261,309	+ 55.54%	First and last appearance in the top ten. Yahata was merged into the new city of Kitakyushu in 1963.

== 1950 ==
Japan emerged from the Second World War in defeat, under temporary American administration. Many cities had been attacked by American bomber forces, and many of the largest cities suffered further loss as residents evacuated to more rural regions of the country. Cities, though, were already recovering quickly from their wartime lows.

Source data is from the 1950 Census.

Rank	2010 Rank	Municipality	Current Prefecture	Population	% Change	Notes
1	1	Tokyo	Tokyo	5,385,071	20.56%	In 1943, the imperial government dissolved the City of Tokyo into its constituent wards, but the Census has continued to treat it as one municipality ever since. Tokyo lost more than a million people to bombing and evacuation.
2	3	Osaka	Osaka	1,956,136	39.85%	Osaka lost more than a million people, and the city has never completely regained its prewar population to date.
3	7	Kyoto	Kyoto	1,101,854	+ 1.11%	Kyoto was not attacked severely during the war.
4	4	Nagoya	Aichi	1,030,635	22.39%	
5	2	Yokohama	Kanagawa	951,189	1.75%	Population briefly passed a million in 1944. Almost recovered its prewar population, despite war losses.
6	6	Kobe	Hyogo	765,435	20.86%	
7	8	Fukuoka	Fukuoka	392,649	+28.00%	Significant population gain, despite war losses.
8	12	Sendai	Miyagi	341,685	+52.54%	Second and last appearance in the top ten. Significant population gain, despite war losses.
9	9	Kawasaki	Kanagawa	319,226	+ 6.13%	Recovered its prewar population, despite war losses.
10	5	Sapporo	Hokkaido	313,850	+52.35%	First appearance in the top ten. Sapporo was not severely attacked during the war.

== 1960 ==
A series of municipal mergers throughout the 1950s known as the "Great Showa Mergers" cut the number of municipalities in Japan by almost two thirds, significantly increasing the size of many cities in the process. By this time, almost all of Japan's largest cities had recovered war losses and exceeded their prewar populations.

Source data is from the 1960 Census.

Rank	2010 Rank	Municipality	Current Prefecture	Population	% Change	Notes
1	1	Tokyo	Tokyo	8,310,027	+ 54.32%	
2	3	Osaka	Osaka	3,011,563	+ 53.95%	Osaka passed 3 million people for the second time, but population remained short of the prewar record.
3	4	Nagoya	Aichi	1,591,935	+ 54.46%	
4	2	Yokohama	Kanagawa	1,375,710	+ 44.63%	Population passed a million for the second time.
5	7	Kyoto	Kyoto	1,284,818	+ 16.61%	
6	6	Kobe	Hyogo	1,113,977	+ 45.54%	Population passed a million people for the first time.
7	8	Fukuoka	Fukuoka	647,122	+ 64.81%	
8	9	Kawasaki	Kanagawa	632,975	+ 98.28%	
9	5	Sapporo	Hokkaido	523,839	+ 66.91%	
10	11	Hiroshima	Hiroshima	431,336	+ 50.82%	Second appearance in the top ten, and last appearance until 1990.

== 1970 ==
Tokyo and Osaka began to experience a trend of suburbanization, as people left the cities for the less densely-populated surrounding municipalities. Other major cities continued to grow rapidly.

Source data is from the 1970 Census.

Rank	2010 Rank	Municipality	Current Prefecture	Population	% Change	Notes
1	1	Tokyo	Tokyo	8,840,942	+ 6.39%	Reached a population peak in 1965.
2	3	Osaka	Osaka	2,980,487	1.03%	Reached its postwar population record in 1965, but subsequently dropped below 3 million people.
3	2	Yokohama	Kanagawa	2,238,264	+ 62.70%	Third Japanese city to pass 2 million people.
4	4	Nagoya	Aichi	2,036,053	+ 27.90%	Fourth Japanese city to pass 2 million people.
5	7	Kyoto	Kyoto	1,419,165	+ 10.46%	
6	6	Kobe	Hyogo	1,288,937	+ 13.67%	
7	13	Kitakyushu	Fukuoka	1,042,321	n/a	First appearance in the top ten. A brand new city, formed in 1963 through the merger of five area cities, including former top ten city Yahata.
8	5	Sapporo	Hokkaido	1,010,123	+ 92.83%	Population passed a million for the first time.
9	9	Kawasaki	Kanagawa	973,486	+ 53.80%	
10	8	Fukuoka	Fukuoka	853,270	+ 31.86%	

== 1980 ==
Source data is from the 1980 Census.

Rank	2010 Rank	Municipality	Current Prefecture	Population	% Change	Notes
1	1	Tokyo	Tokyo	8,351,893	5.53%	
2	2	Yokohama	Kanagawa	2,773,674	+ 23.92%	Surpassed Osaka's population to become Japan's new second most populous Japanese city.
3	3	Osaka	Osaka	2,648,180	11.15%	
4	4	Nagoya	Aichi	2,087,982	+ 2.55%	
5	7	Kyoto	Kyoto	1,473,065	+ 3.80%	
6	5	Sapporo	Hokkaido	1,401,757	+ 38.77%	
7	6	Kobe	Hyogo	1,367,390	+ 6.09%	
8	8	Fukuoka	Fukuoka	1,088,588	+ 27.58%	Population passed a million for the first time.
9	13	Kitakyushu	Fukuoka	1,065,078	+ 2.18%	Last appearance in the top ten. To date, 1980 is the city's population record. Kitakyushu subsequently began losing people, dropping below a million by 2005.
10	9	Kawasaki	Kanagawa	1,040,802	+ 6.91%	Population passed a million for the first time.

== 1990 ==
By 1990, almost all the largest Japanese cities had assumed their present-day population ranking.

Source data is from the 1990 Census.

Rank	2010 Rank	Municipality	Current Prefecture	Population	% Change	Notes
1	1	Tokyo	Tokyo	8,163,573	2.25%	
2	2	Yokohama	Kanagawa	3,220,331	+ 16.10%	The third Japanese city to pass 3 million people.
3	3	Osaka	Osaka	2,623,801	0.92%	
4	4	Nagoya	Aichi	2,154,793	+ 3.20%	
5	5	Sapporo	Hokkaido	1,671,742	+ 19.26%	
6	6	Kobe	Hyogo	1,477,410	+ 8.05%	
7	7	Kyoto	Kyoto	1,461,103	0.81%	Kyoto reached its record population in 1985, and has been fluctuating just below that level ever since.
8	8	Fukuoka	Fukuoka	1,237,062	+ 13.64%	
9	9	Kawasaki	Kanagawa	1,173,603	+ 12.76%	
10	11	Hiroshima	Hiroshima	1,085,705	+ 20.77%	Third appearance in the top ten. Population passed a million for the first time.

== 2000 ==
By 2002, the ongoing suburbanization drawing population from Tōkyō and Ōsaka was showing signs of abating, with people slowly moving back into the cities proper.

Source data is from the 2000 Census.

Rank	2010 Rank	Municipality	Current Prefecture	Population	% Change	Notes
1	1	Tokyo	Tokyo	8,134,688	0.35%	Population reached its post-1965 low in 1995, dipping just under 8 million people, but began rising afterwards.
2	2	Yokohama	Kanagawa	3,426,651	+ 6.41%	
3	3	Osaka	Osaka	2,598,774	0.95%	Osaka's post-1965 population low.
4	4	Nagoya	Aichi	2,171,557	+ 0.78%	
5	5	Sapporo	Hokkaido	1,822,368	+ 9.01%	
6	6	Kobe	Hyogo	1,493,398	+ 1.08%	
7	7	Kyoto	Kyoto	1,467,785	+ 0.46%	
8	8	Fukuoka	Fukuoka	1,341,470	+ 8.44%	
9	9	Kawasaki	Kanagawa	1,249,905	+ 6.50%	
10	11	Hiroshima	Hiroshima	1,126,239	+ 8.21%	Last appearance in the top ten to date.

== 2010 ==
In the mid-2000s, another series of municipal mergers was enacted. The "Great Heisei Mergers" nearly halved the number of municipalities in Japan, once again increasing the size of some cities significantly and creating new towns and cities. Despite a mounting population loss in rural areas and some smaller cities, Japan's major cities continue to grow.

Source date is from the 2010 Census.

Rank	Municipality	Prefecture	Population	% Change	Notes
1	Tokyo	Tokyo	8,945,695	+ 9.63%	
2	Yokohama	Kanagawa	3,688,773	+ 7.67%	
3	Osaka	Osaka	2,665,314	+ 2.60%	
4	Nagoya	Aichi	2,263,894	+ 4.25%	
5	Sapporo	Hokkaido	1,913,545	+ 5.05%	Record population.
6	Kobe	Hyogo	1,544,200	+ 3.45%	
7	Kyoto	Kyoto	1,474,015	+ 0.46%	
8	Fukuoka	Fukuoka	1,463,743	+ 9.12%	
9	Kawasaki	Kanagawa	1,425,512	+ 14.06%	
10	Saitama	Saitama	1,222,434	n/a	First appearance in the top ten. A brand new city, formed in 2001 through the merger of area cities.
