= Bombing of Yahata =

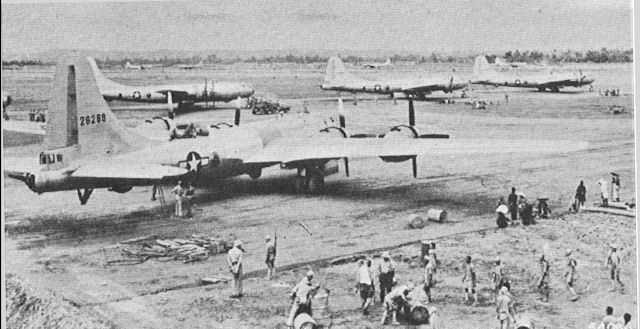
- B-29 Superfortress bombers photographed shortly before they participated in the Bombing of Yahata, Japan on 15 June 1944; this was the first raid conducted by B-29 bombers on Japan.
- Date: June 15, 1944 – August 8, 1945
- Location: Yahata
- Type: Bombing
- Cause: World War II
- Outcome: 21 percent of Yahata's urban area being destroyed

The Japanese city of Yahata (which was incorporated into the larger city of Kitakyushu in 1963) was subjected to three major air raids during World War II, part of the U.S. strategic bombing campaign.

== First and second raids ==
The first raid took place on the night of 15/16 June 1944. This was the first attack on the Japanese home islands by United States Army Air Forces bombers since the Doolittle Raid of 1942. The city was next attacked during the day and night of 20 August 1944. These two attacks caused little damage to the city's industrial facilities.

== Third raid ==
The third raid was conducted on 8 August 1945 and resulted in 21 percent of Yahata's urban area being destroyed. The third raid may have spared nearby Kokura from destruction: Kokura was to be the primary target for the second atomic bomb the following day, but smoke from the fires in Yahata combined with cloud cover decreased visibility to the point that the secondary target of Nagasaki was bombed instead.
