= Tanaka Chōbei =

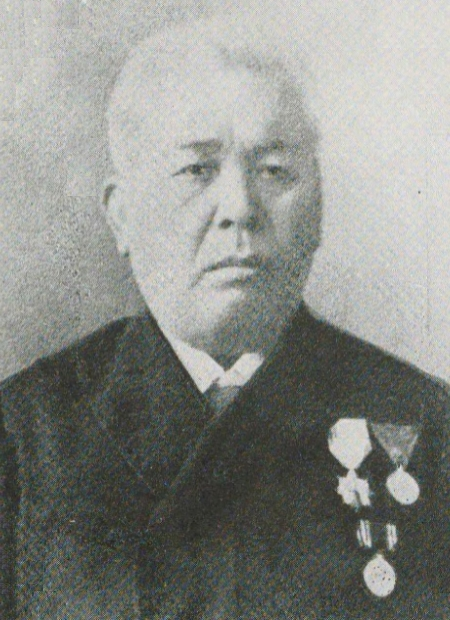
- Tanaka Chōbei
- Born: 1834; Sizuoka
- Died: 1901 (aged 66–67); Tokyo

Tanaka Chōbei (田中 長兵衛) was a merchant and purveyor to Japan's military during the Meiji Period. He established Kamaishi Mine Tanaka Ironworks (Kamaishi Kōzan Tanaka Seitetsusho) in 1887, which was Japan's first modern private ironworks and remained the only one in the country until 1901, when the state-run ironworks was built again.

A few years earlier, in 1874, Japan's Ministry of Industries (Kōbushō) had decided to build a modern furnace at Kamaishi . It appointed German engineers who went on to build a large-scale mill (with a railway system to carry the product and iron ore) utilizing two imported 25-ton furnaces. Local experts had advised a more modest method of learn-by-doing and gradual scale-up. The government, which never questioned the superiority of Western technology, overrode these objections and proceeded to construct the plant and operation started in 1890. However, within 196 days the plant had to be shut down and the government gave up- mainly due to the use of poor quality coke.

Tanaka entered the steel business by taking over this loss-making government-run enterprise. He reverted to the earlier advise of building with smaller furnaces (5-6 ton), adapting the technology to local conditions, and then scaling up. Building on local knowledge, he adapted foreign technology through a process of trial and error – it took his people 22 months and 49 trial operations before they could finally produce iron. There was also help from Kageyoshi Noro.

By 1894, Tanaka was in a position not only to repair but also redesign British-made furnaces and succeeded in restarting them using coke as fuel.

Tanaka Chōbei owned mines all over Japan, as well as the Jinguashi mine in northern Taiwan. His ironworks in Kamaishi produced the majority of Japan's domestic pig iron in 1894.

== Honors ==
- Medal of Honor with Yellow Ribbon (23 May 1887)
