= New Taipei City Gold Museum =

Museum in Ruifang, New Taipei, Taiwan

- 新北市立黃金博物館
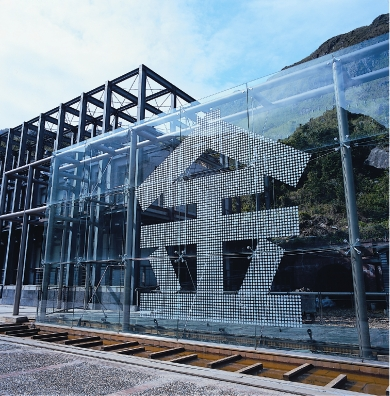
- The Gold Building
- Established: 4 November 2004
- Location: Ruifang, New Taipei, Taiwan
- Coordinates: 25°06′35″N 121°51′26″E
- Type: museum
- Visitors: 2,184,043 (2016)
- Owner: New Taipei City Government
- Website: Official website

The New Taipei City Gold Museum (traditional Chinese: 新北市立黃金博物館; simplified Chinese: 新北市立黄金博物馆; pinyin: Xīnběishìlì Huángjīn Bówùguǎn), formerly known as the Gold Ecological Park, is a museum of the gold mining industry in Ruifang District, New Taipei, Taiwan.

== History ==
The museum was opened on 4 November 2004 by the Taipei County Government as Gold Ecological Park (Chinese: 黃金博物園區). After the formation of New Taipei City, the park was renamed Gold Museum, though as of December 2015, some signage still shows the old name, including the front entrance gate.

== Architecture ==
The Gold Museum is an open-air museum consisting of several buildings and sites. The museum buildings used to be offices, dormitories, processing plants and other facilities of the Taiwan Metal Mining Corp. The Gold Museum includes the following: Gold Building, Experience the Benshan Fifth Tunnel, Crown Prince Chalet, Jin Shui Special Exhibition Hall, Gold Refining Building, and Four Joined Japanese-Style Residences.

== Exhibitions ==
The Gold Building provides information about the discovery of gold in the area, with displays on the Benshan Tunnels, old mining equipment, mining transport systems and a brief introduction to the World War II Japanese Kinkaseki POW Camp on its first floor. The second floor introduces the properties of gold, with works of art made of gold and a world-record 220.30 kg 999.9 pure gold brick for visitors to see and touch.

The Crown Prince Chalet is a residence built in 1922 for the proposed visit of Crown Prince Hirohito to the area (a visit that never materialized). Decades later it was used by Chiang Kai-shek as lodging in the area.

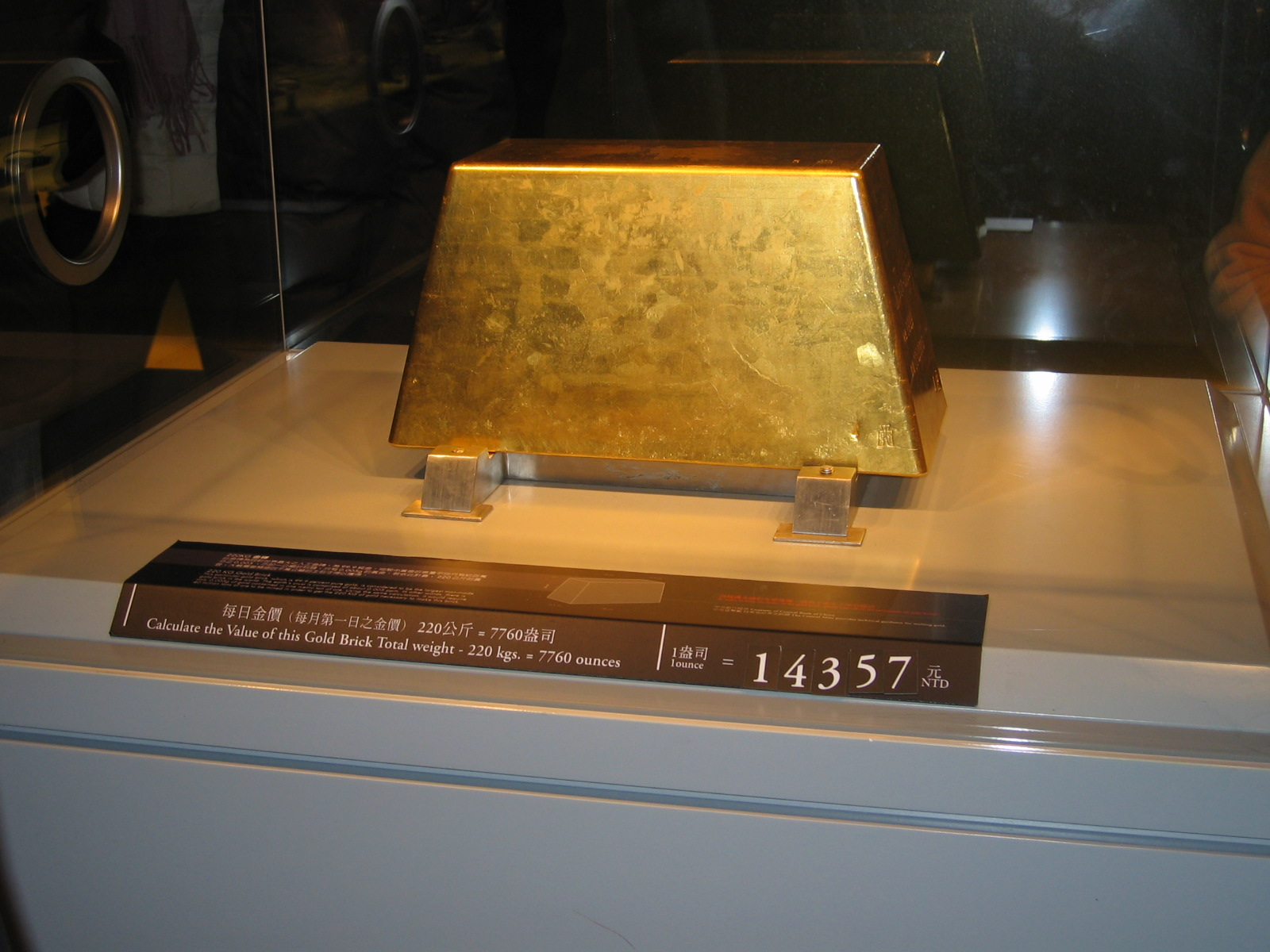
The 220.30 kg 999.9 pure gold brick is the famous collection of Gold Building.

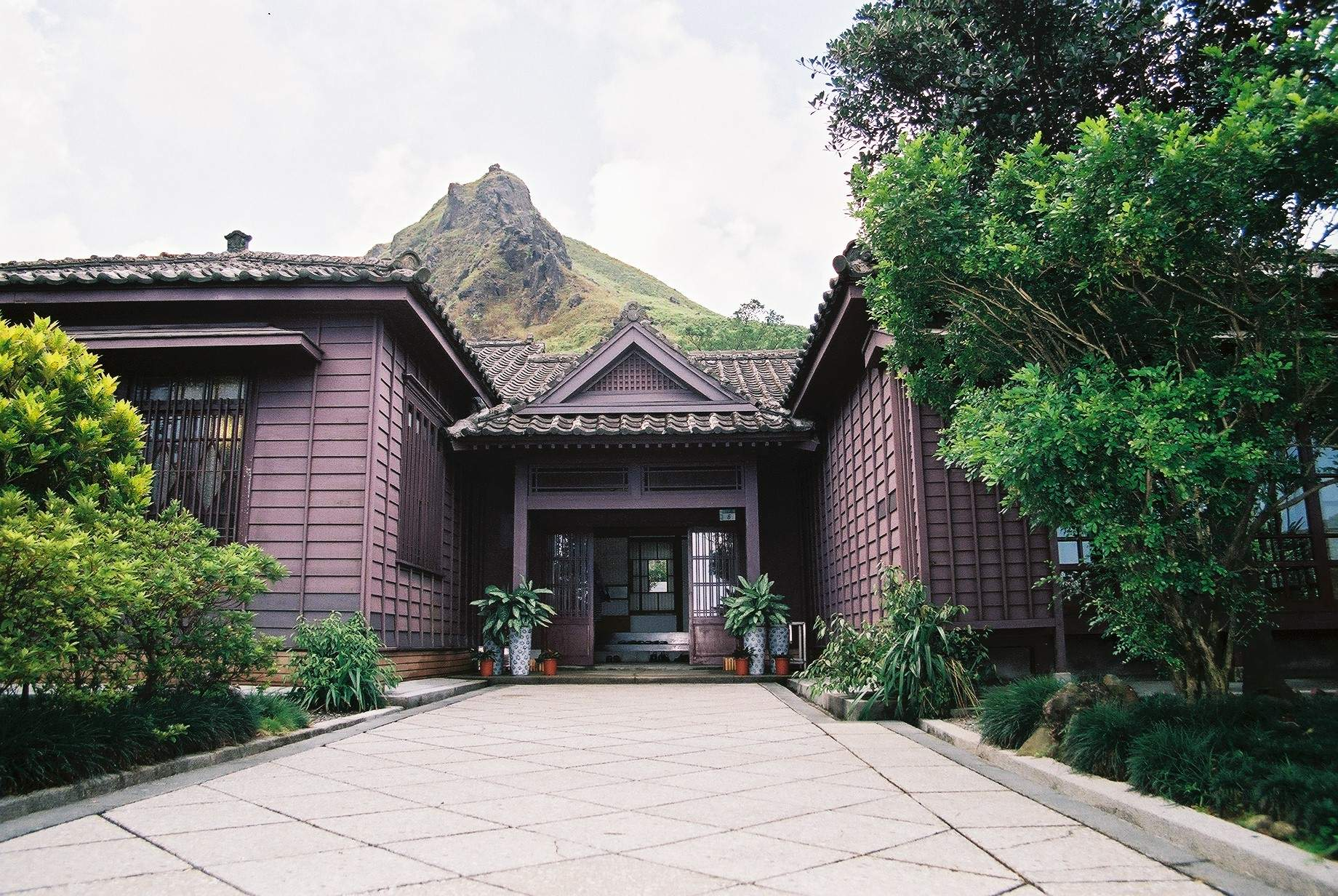
The Crown Prince Chalet.

== Transportation ==
The museum is accessible by bus from Ruifang Station of the Taiwan Railway.

== See also ==
- List of museums in Taiwan
- Jinguashi Mine
- Ōgon Shrine
- Jinguashi
