= Noro Kageyoshi =

Japanese metallurgist

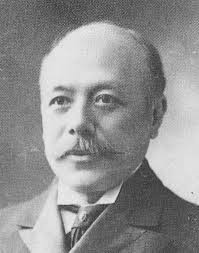

Noro Kageyoshi (Japanese: 野呂 景義, October 17, 1854 - September 8, 1923) was a Japanese metallurgist who contributed to the modernization of Japan's steel industry.

== Biography ==
Noro Kageyoshi was born in 1854 in Nagoya, Japan. After finishing his primary education in Nagoya and his secondary education in Tokyo, he studied mining and metallurgy at the college, which would later become part of Imperial University of Tokyo. After graduation in 1882, he became assistant to Curt Netto of his alma mater and continued to study metallurgy while he taught students.

In 1885–89, Noro went to Europe to study mechanical engineering and electrical engineering at the University of London and metallurgy at Freiberg University of Mining and Technology, Netto's alma mater. Upon return to Japan, he became professor of his own alma mater and taught students, like Kuniichi Tawara (俵国一), Kaichiro Imaizumi (今泉嘉一郎) and others who would be the main force in Japan's metallurgy and steel industry. In 1891, he received Japan's first Doctor of Engineering degree from the Ministry of Education.

Noro also worked for the Ministry of Agriculture and Commerce to plan for the national government-owned steel plant, but was led to be involved in the Tokyo City Water Supply Tubes Incident, and distanced himself from any government work.

When Japan's first modern government-owned steel plant was established in Kamaishi, Iwate, it didn't work properly. Noro helped Tanaka Chōbei's Kamaishi Tanaka Plant, a privately owned plant nearby, to successfully work, by providing Japan's first coking oven, and the private plant eventually absorbed the government plant.

In 1895, the government appointed Noro Kageyoshi, along with Tsuyoshi Makino (牧野毅, who would later establish NKK) and others, on a commission to plan on a large-scale government-owned steel plant, but he was ousted in due course because he was against such a much hurried plan.

In February 1901, Yawata Steel Works was opened with German help, but its production of iron at the blast furnace immediately stopped because of multiple technical problems, and the German advisers were all ousted. Noro was called in and several key corrections were made to resume production in July, 1904. It was the time of the Russo-Japanese War when the demand for iron and steel surged.

In 1915, Noro established the Iron and Steel Institute of Japan (日本鉄鋼協会) and was elected the president of this organization.

While having been suffering from the complications of pneumonia since March 1922, Noro heard that the building of the Iron and Steel Institute of Japan collapsed in the Great Kanto Earthquake of September 1, 1923. He died several days later, on September 8, 1923.

== See also ==
- Yawata Steel Works
- History of the steel industry (1850–1970)#Japan
