= Francesco Noro =

Italian painter (1871–1947)

Francesco Noro (1871–1947) was an Italian painter.

He was born to a family of decorative painters, and studied at the Cignaroli Academy of Fine Arts in Verona in 1895. His first major work, depicting a Glory of Santa Margherita (1904) was completed for the parish church of Durlo, a frazione of Crespadoro. He briefly emigrated to Switzerland in 1906. In Arzignano, he painted for the church of San Bernardino in Canossiane (1906), the parish church of Pugnello (1908), and the church of San Bortolo (1929–1931). He also made the exterior decoration of the Orphanage (Asilo d'infanzia) Bonazzi. He died in Vicenza in 1947.
