= Norrö, Värmdö Municipality =

Norrö
- Location within Stockholm Location within Sweden
- Coordinates: 59.454133°N 18.904736°E
- Country: Sweden
- Province: Södermanland
- County: Stockholm County
- Municipality: Värmdö Municipality

Norrö is an island in the northern part of Stockholm archipelago, which forms part of Värmdö Municipality, Stockholm County, Sweden.
