= Yahata Steel Works =

Steel mill in Kitakyūshū, Fukuoka Prefecture, Japan

Coordinates: 33°54′10″N 130°49′48″E

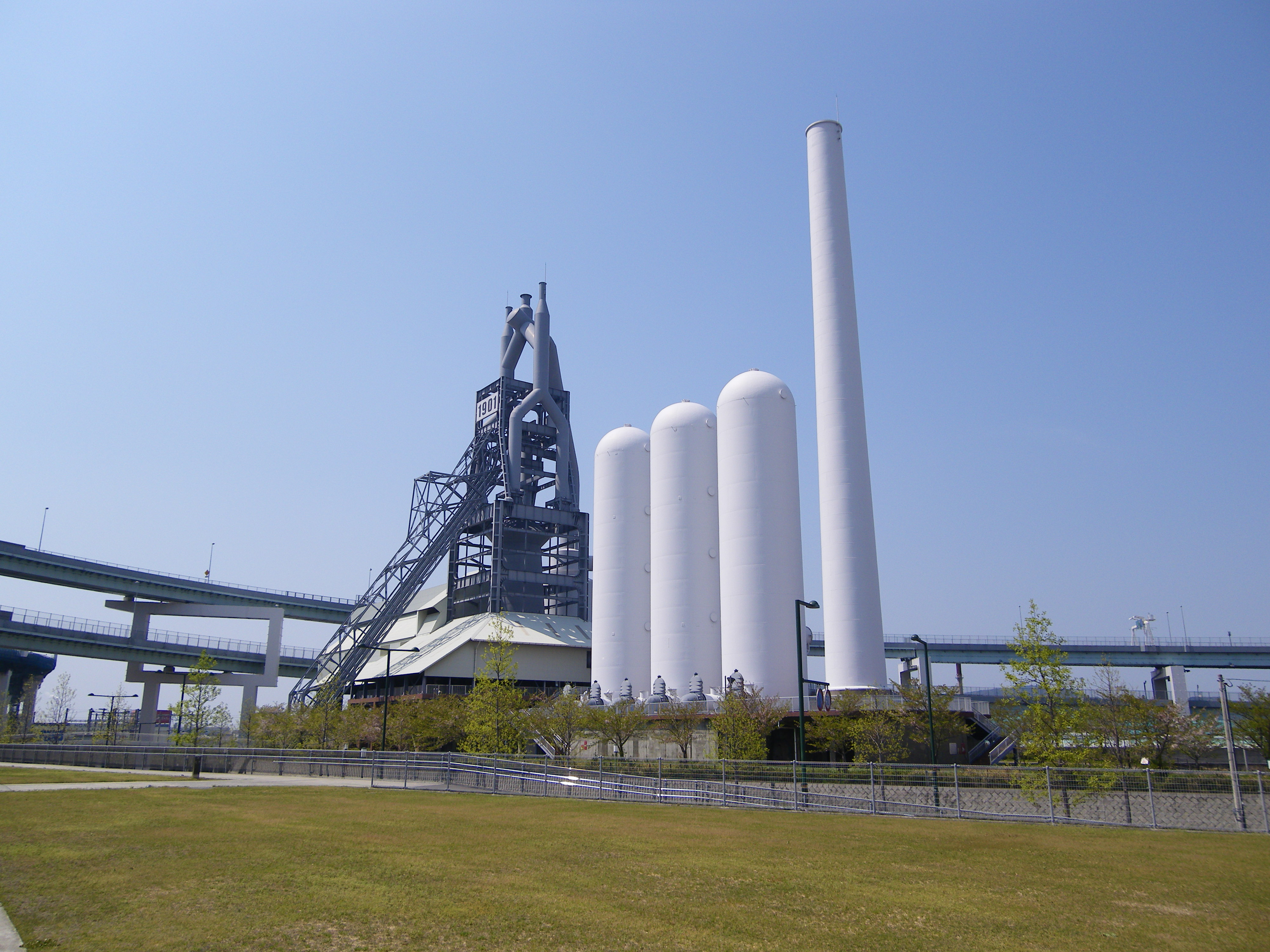
Higashida First Blast Furnace, operational in 1901 with a nominal daily output of 160 tons; now a Municipal Cultural Property

The Yahata Steel Works (八幡製鐵所, Yahata seitetsu-sho, Yawata seitetsu-sho) is a steel mill in Kitakyūshū, Fukuoka Prefecture, Japan. Imperial Steel Works was established in 1896 to meet increasing demand from the nation's burgeoning shipbuilding, railway, construction, and armaments industries. The site chosen was the former town of Yahata, now merged into Kitakyūshū, near coal mines and with easy access to the sea.

== History ==
With the opening of Japan, Western-style reverberatory furnaces had been introduced in a number of areas to replace the native tatara system. In the early Meiji period, blast furnaces were constructed at sites such as Kamaishi in Iwate Prefecture, near deposits of iron.

The Higashida First Blast Furnace, designed and tooled by German engineering firm Gute Hoffnungshütte, began operations at Yahata on 5 February 1901. The low quality of output, high ratio of coke consumption to steel produced, and a number of failures led to suspension the following year; all but one of the German advisers were dismissed and the defects remedied by their local replacements. These included Kageyoshi Noro (野呂景義), "father of Japanese metallurgy". The state-owned mill was not profitable in its early years and had to rely on subsidies by the government.

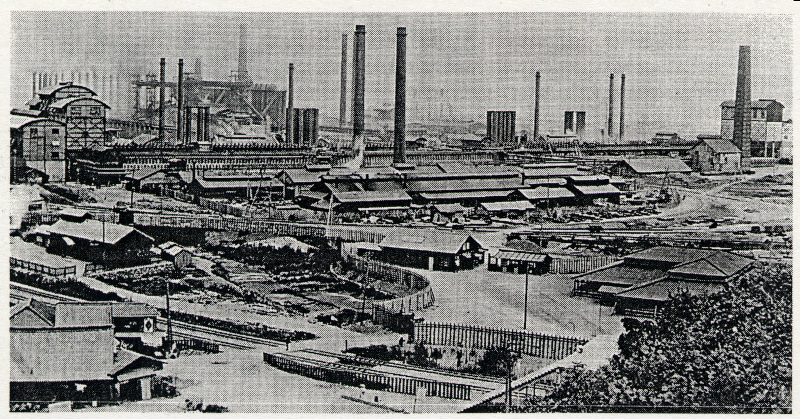
Yahata Steel Works in the Taishō era

By 1912, 80% of Japan's pig iron production was from Yahata. An integrated mill with coke, iron, and steel facilities, Yahata was also responsible at this time for 80-90% of Japan's steel output. Energy efficiency was greatly improved by the conversion from steam to electricity as a power source, resulting in a drop in consumption of coal per ton of steel produced from four tons in 1920 to 1.58 in 1933. Much of the iron ore was from China and Korea.

On May 1, 1916 the dam burst and flooded much of the town and factory killing hundreds. Kuroda Coke Oven (黒田式コークス炉), a furnace recovered by-products through a regenerative burning apparatus, invented in 1918 by Kuroda Taizo (黒田泰造 1883-1961), an engineer at the Yahata Works, was a revolutionary energy-saving oven based on an energy-recycling system. The oven also improved by-product processing and increased coke processing yields. By 1933, the energy efficiency of the eighth coke oven at the Yahata Works was almost equal to that of the most advanced coke oven in Germany. The improvement in the quality of coke was directly reflected in the energy efficiency of iron and steelmaking. In addition, energy recycling techniques such as reuse of the gas generated in the coke oven and blast furnaces were exploited by the system. These efforts helped reduce the energy consumption of the works. The coal consumption per ton of steel production sharply dropped to 1.58 tonnes in 1933 from 3.7 tonnes in 1924. Eventually, Kuroda's idea of energy saving and recycling became fundamental for Japanese steel engineers. In 1962, this technological heritage would produce one of the most important innovations, the Basic Oxygen Furnace Waste Gas Cooling and Clearing System, invented at Yawata Steel (a successor of the Yahata Works).

The continuing importance of the Yahata Steel Works to Japan's heavy industry led to Yahata being identified as a target for strategic bombing during the Pacific War, commencing with the Bombing of Yawata in June 1944, by which time the works produced 24% of Japan's rolled steel. The works were identified as the target for the second atomic bomb on 9 August 1945; due to cloud cover this was redirected to Nagasaki.

After a number of expansions and corporate reorganizations, the steel works are now owned by Nippon Steel (formerly the world's largest steel producer) and are important to the export market as a supplier to the car makers of Kyushu. In 2014, the Yahata Steel Works joined the UNESCO World Heritage List as one of Sites of Japan's Meiji Industrial Revolution, a serial nomination of sites that played an important part in the industrialization of Japan in the Bakumatsu and Meiji periods.

== See also ==
- Nippon Steel Yawata SC, former football club, existing from 1950 to 1999
- Showa Steel Works
- Miike coal mine
- Air raids on Japan
