= Eisaku Noro Company =

Yarn manufacturing company

Eisaku Noro Company, Ltd.
- Industry: Manufacturing
- Founder: Eisaku Noro
- Headquarters: Ichinomiya, Aichi, Japan
- Area served: Worldwide
- Key people: Eisaku Noro, Takuo Noro
- Products: Yarn
- Owner: Takuo Noro
- Website: http://www.eisakunoro.com/

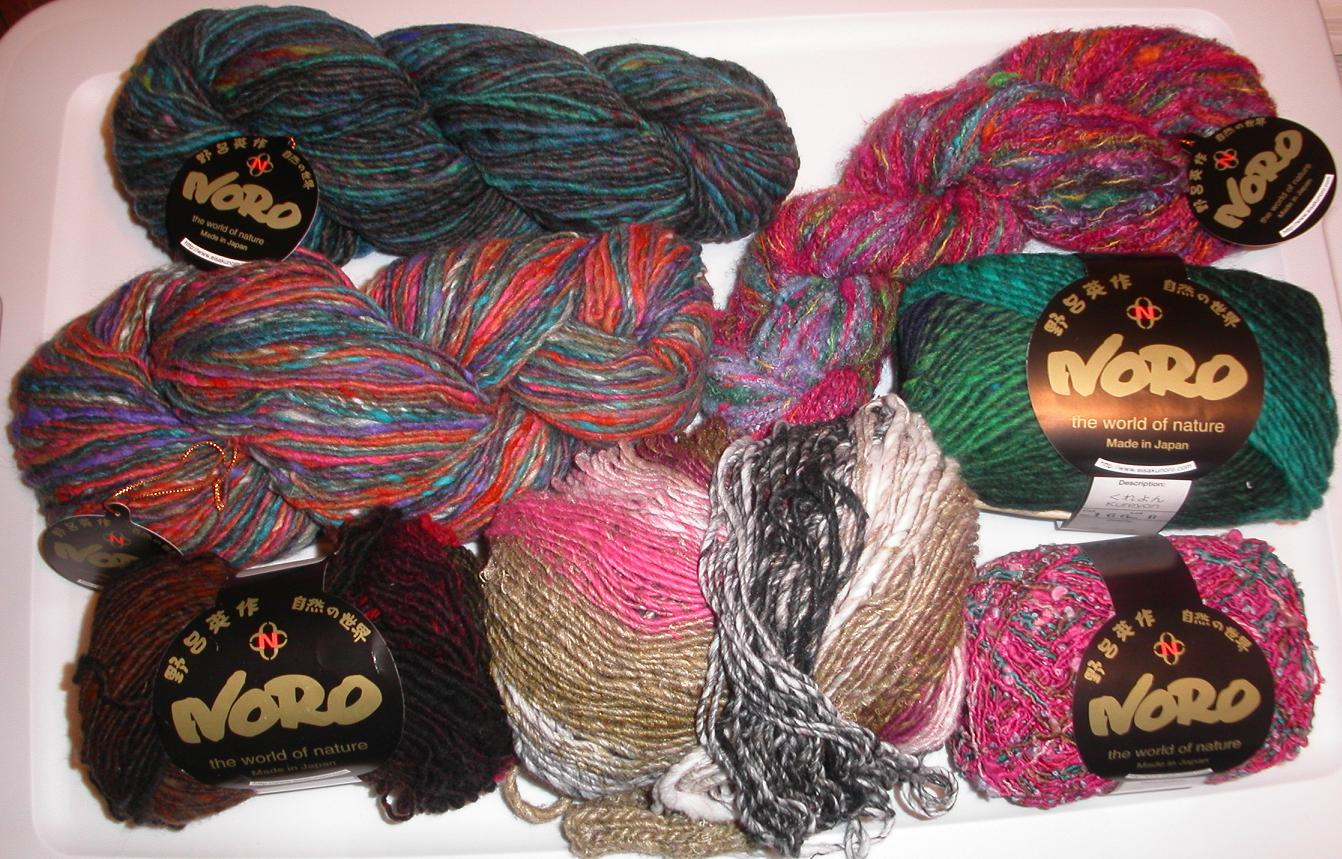
A selection of Noro handcrafting yarns

Eisaku Noro Company, Ltd. is a yarn manufacturer located in the Aichi Prefecture of Japan. The company produces yarns for handcrafting under the Noro brand name, as well as machine yarns for textile production using the Eisaku Noro label. The company was founded over forty years ago by Eisaku Noro. The handcrafting yarns in particular are well known for their vivid colors and combinations of diverse fiber types. They differ from a number of other manufactured yarns in the industry by having lengthier spans of color in the runs, causing distinctive striping patterns, as well as being partially spun by hand versus being produced completely by machines. In 2012, Noro Knitting Magazine initiated publication, which features knit and crochet patterns specifically designed for use with the yarns.

== Founder ==
Eisaku Noro had a love of painting since childhood, and into adulthood. He won a gold prize during his junior year of school in a drawing competition, and his art teacher tried to persuade his parents to encourage him to become a professional painter. He attributed his skill using color combinations to having been able to observe nature in an unspoiled area of Japan where he grew up.

He attended and graduated from Matsusaka Technical High School located on Honshu island in the Mie prefecture. Afterward, he worked for two wool spinning companies, each producing specialty yarn. During this eighteen-year period, he gained production skills as well as managerial knowledge. He decided to leave and go into business on his own in order to implement his own ideas and creativity.

Eisaku Noro died on September 2, 2022. Many tributes were given by distributors, yarn stores on the web and in the Noro Knitting & Crochet Magazine #21 Fall/Winter 2022 issue article, "Remembering Mr. Noro-San". His son Takuo succeeded him in taking charge of the company.

== Production ==
All animal fibers that are used in the yarns come from certified organic farms, from international sources such as Australia, the Falkland Islands and South Africa. Eisaku Noro was personally involved with inspecting all aspects of production, from visiting the animal farms to checking the machinery used and keeping restrictions on the dye processes to maintain products that are as eco-friendly as possible. He said "Friction, rubbing and heat during processing weaken the fibers in direct proportion to the length of time they are processed. By dramatically shortening this process, we are preventing damage to the enzymes in the fibers and simultaneously profiting the environment."

Differences in processing from other yarn manufacturers include the use of a single roller on the carding machine instead of the usual three, hand-feeding tufts of fiber into the carding machine, and the arrangement of specified color runs by hand. The single roller as well as the shorter bed on the spinning machine result in less twist to the single ply than other yarns, giving a variance in thickness along its length. The spinning method allows the yarns to be thirty to forty percent lighter in weight than similar yarns of the same thickness.

One of the brand's unique yarns is Silk Garden, made with a high proportion of mohair and silk. Due to their inherent properties, neither fiber has scales on the surface, which prevents them from clinging together the way wool and other fibers with scales normally would, making spinning them difficult. Eisaku Noro had to develop a new approach to working with the fibers in order to be able to spin them in high quantities, which the industry had previously thought impossible.

In order to emphasize the particular qualities of one fiber over another, for instance sheen or softness, the yarns are deliberately spun with uneven distributions of the fibers, instead of the same proportion of all the fibers throughout the skein. This results in a pleasing spotted, or slubbed, appearance in the end fabric.

The signature vivid color palettes of the yarns are inspired by natural items, such as forests, flower blossoms, and seas, with complementary accents. Eisaku Noro says developing a new yarn composition of colors and materials can take up to six or seven years.

== 2011 earthquake ==
Following the devastating 2011 Tōhoku earthquake and tsunami, Eisaku Noro addressed a letter on March 18, 2011, to their US distributor, Knitting Fever, and to his customers, who desired to donate funds for relief efforts for Japan. The letter states that he and his company were fortunate not to have suffered any damages, relates the plight of the people who were affected, and expresses his gratitude to those concerned for them.

Another letter that contained a map and Lufthansa's precautionary shipping statement, originally on the European handcraft yarn distributor's website from Noro's son and operations manager Takuo Noro, gives details of the distances of their main site and dye house from the damaged Fukushima nuclear power plant, as well as the ports their company uses to import raw goods and export products. The ports, in Nagoya, Osaka, and Kobe, are located to the south or west of the company. He also states that the production facilities are all indoors and the radiation levels in these areas have not changed from normal levels. He concludes the letter saying there have been no changes in their surroundings since the earthquake and that the Japanese government was considering conducting radiation inspections on all of the nation's outgoing products.
