= Norrö, Österåker Municipality =

Norrö
- Location within Stockholm Location within Sweden
- Coordinates: 59°30′N 18°16′E
- Country: Sweden
- Province: Uppland
- County: Stockholm County
- Municipality: Österåker Municipality

Area
  - Total: 0.63 km^{2} (0.24 sq mi)

Population (31 December 2010)
  - Total: 305
  - Density: 483/km^{2} (1,250/sq mi)
- Time zone: UTC+1 (CET)
  - Summer (DST): UTC+2 (CEST)

Norrö is a locality situated in Österåker Municipality, Stockholm County, Sweden with 305 inhabitants in 2010. It is situated some 2.5 kilometres (1.6 mi) north of the town of Åkersberga.
