= Yahata, Fukuoka =

Former city in Japan

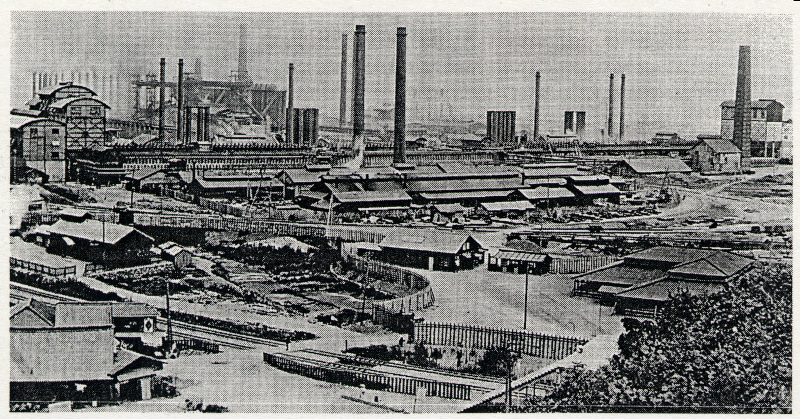
Yahata Steel Works in the Taishō era

Yahata (八幡, Yahata), sometimes referred to as Yawata, (Note: This is an error derived from a mistaken understanding of the pronunciation of the Chinese characters that constitute the city's name.) was a former city in Fukuoka Prefecture, Japan.

The three villages of Ogura, Ōkura, and Edamitsu, which were part of Onga District, merged to form Yahata Village in 1889. The new municipality's name was derived from local worship of Shinto deity Yahata. The village was elevated to town status in 1900. The town began to develop rapidly when the Yahata Steel Works opened in 1901, and was elevated to city status in 1917. Because of its industrial significance, the city was heavily bombed during the Second World War.

Yahata was merged with four neighbouring municipalities to form the modern city of Kitakyushu in 1963. It constituted Kitakyushu's Yahata ward until 1974, when it was divided into Yahatanishi and Yahatahigashi.
