= Jinguashi =

Historic mining town in north Taiwan

Coordinates: 25°07′N 121°51′E

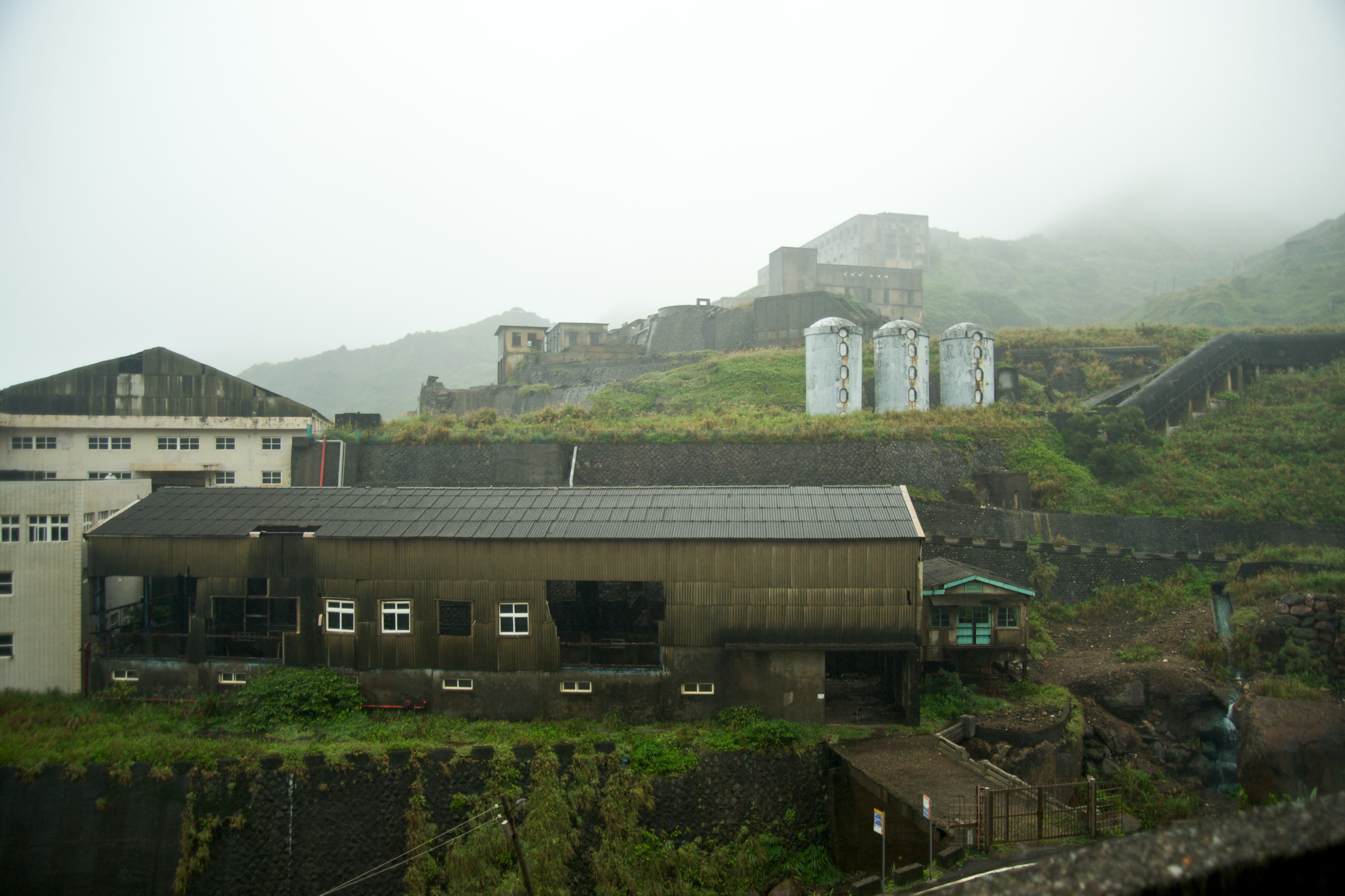
Abandoned mining facilities

Jinguashi (Chinkuashih; Chinese: 金瓜石; pinyin: Jīnguāshí; Wade–Giles: Chin^{1}-kua^{1}-shih^{2}; Pe̍h-ōe-jī: Kim-koe-chio̍h) is a town in Ruifang District, New Taipei City, Taiwan, notable for its historic gold and copper mines. It was also known as Kinkaseki in Japanese and was under Taihoku Prefecture during Japanese rule.

From 1942 to 1945, the town was the location of the Kinkaseki Prisoner of War (POW) Camp (Chinese: 金瓜石戰俘營; Japanese: 金瓜石／きんかせき捕虜監視所). Of the 430 Allied POW deaths across all fourteen Japanese POW camps on Taiwan, the majority occurred at Kinkaseki.

== Under Japanese rule ==
Kinkaseki was an important mining town for the Empire of Japan during Japan's rule over Taiwan. United States Navy analysis during World War II found that the Kinkaseki gold mines were among Imperial Japan's largest sources of gold, based on figures from 1937. The mines also produced substantial amounts of copper—7,350 tons in 1936, more than anywhere else in Taiwan—and some silver. The mines were operated by Taiwan Kōgyō K.K. (Taiwan Mining Company, 台湾鉱業株式会社) and covered approximately 5.5 million tsubo (18.18 km^{2}). Forced laborers also cleared agricultural land and improved water work; beriberi was rampant among the prisoners.

The Kinkaseki prisoner of war camp (Kinkaseki #1) was opened on November 14, 1942. The initial POWs arrived from Singapore after its capture by Japan. Over 1,100 Allied (mostly British) POWs were held in the camp and forced to work in the mines. Conditions were appalling, one prisoner of war Jack Edwards wrote later, "daily we were 'bashed,' harangued, starved, humiliated, intimidated, tortured and forced to do hard labour in that hell-hole. Our health was ignored, ridiculed. This went on for over two and one-half years at Kinkaseki."

The camp mines were closed in March 1945, as transport of copper to the Japanese home islands become impossible due to Allied naval power. The POWs were relocated to Kukutsu POW Camp in Hsintien (Xindian District) by late June 1945.

== Post-war ==
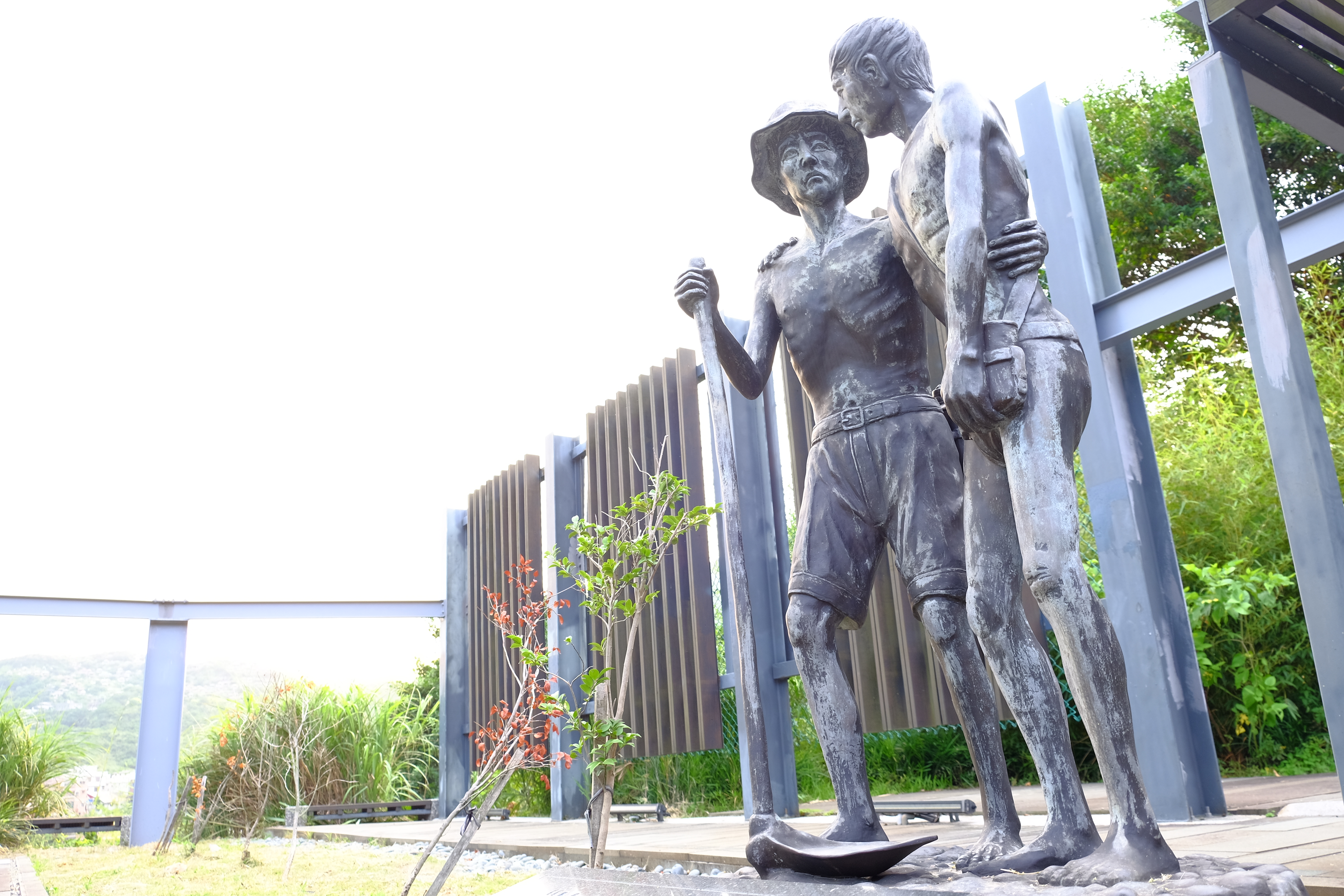
Memorial to Allied POWs

Following the Allied defeat of Imperial Japan, charges were brought against nine employees of Nippon Mining Company (the parent company of Taiwan Kōgyō) for cruelty and mistreatment of POWs at Kinkaseki. On May 28, 1947, eight of the nine were found guilty by the British War Crime Court Number Five in Hong Kong. The court held the company, not the Japanese Army, responsible for mistreatment of POWs.

A memorial park at the site of the POW camp was opened in 1997.

Although the minerals have since been depleted, the town still attracts many visitors to its Gold Ecological Park, which opened in October 2004. Jinguashi was named a potential World Heritage Site in 2002.

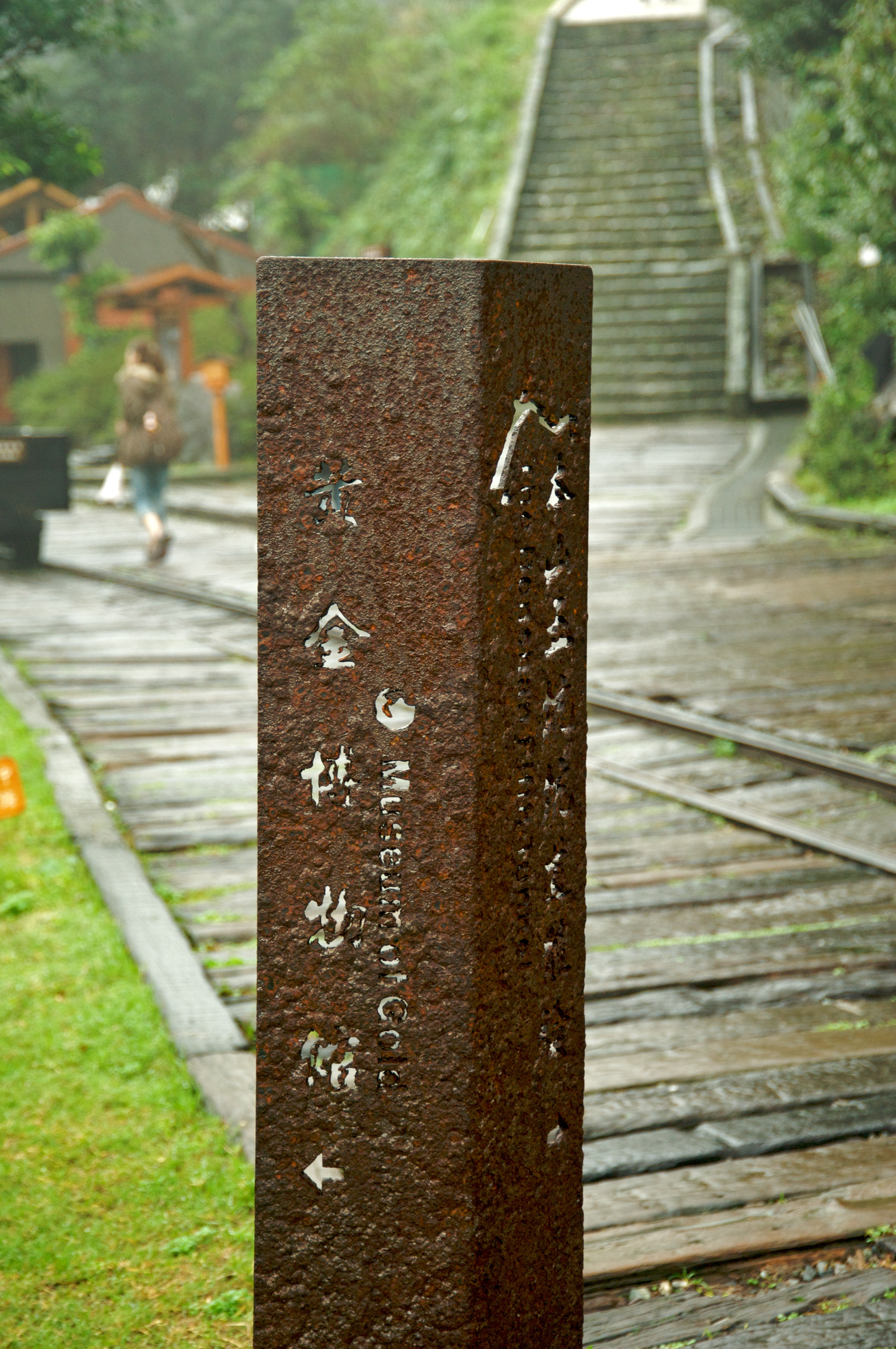
Historic gold mine museum

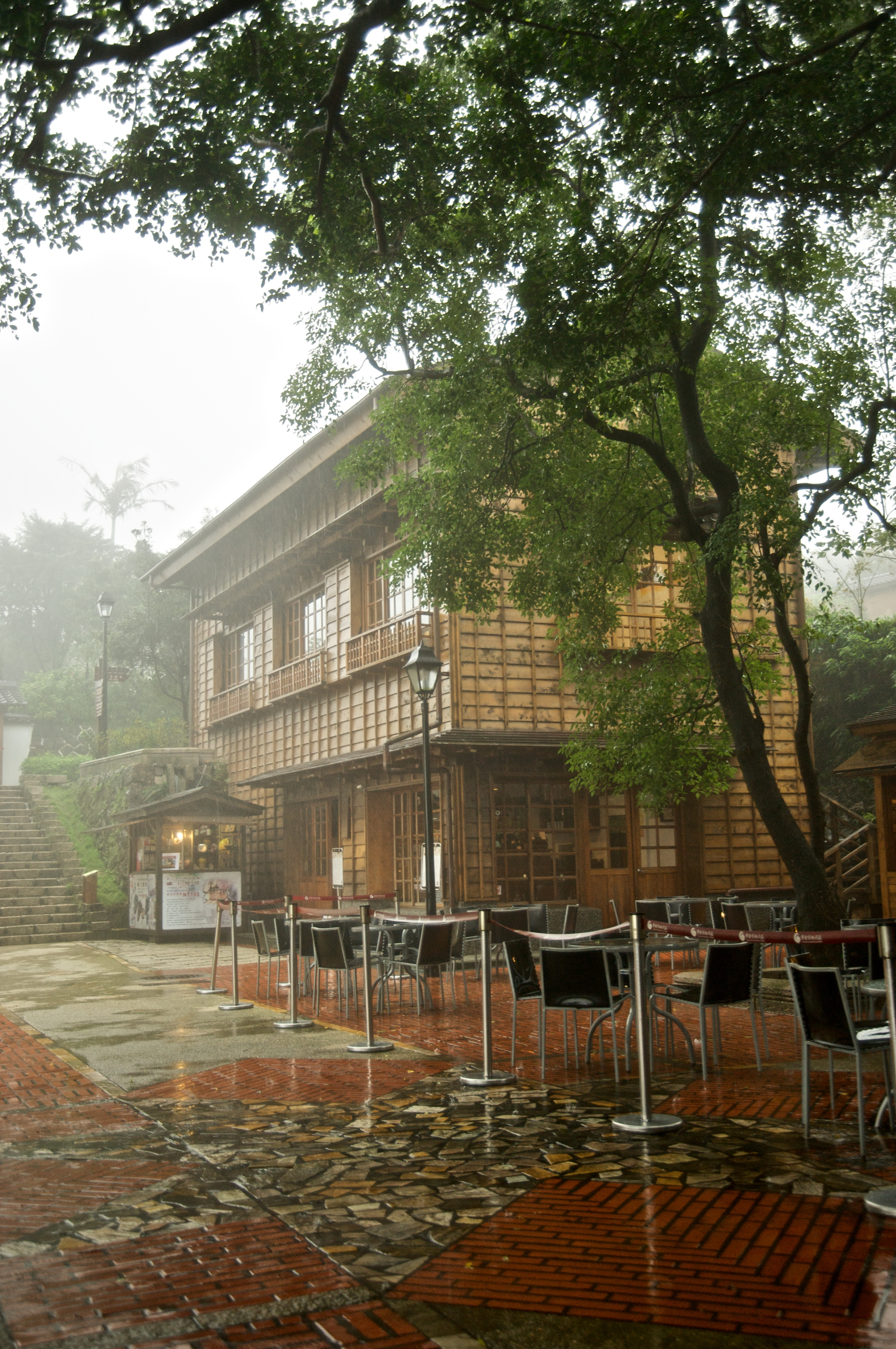
Outdoor cafe by museum entrance

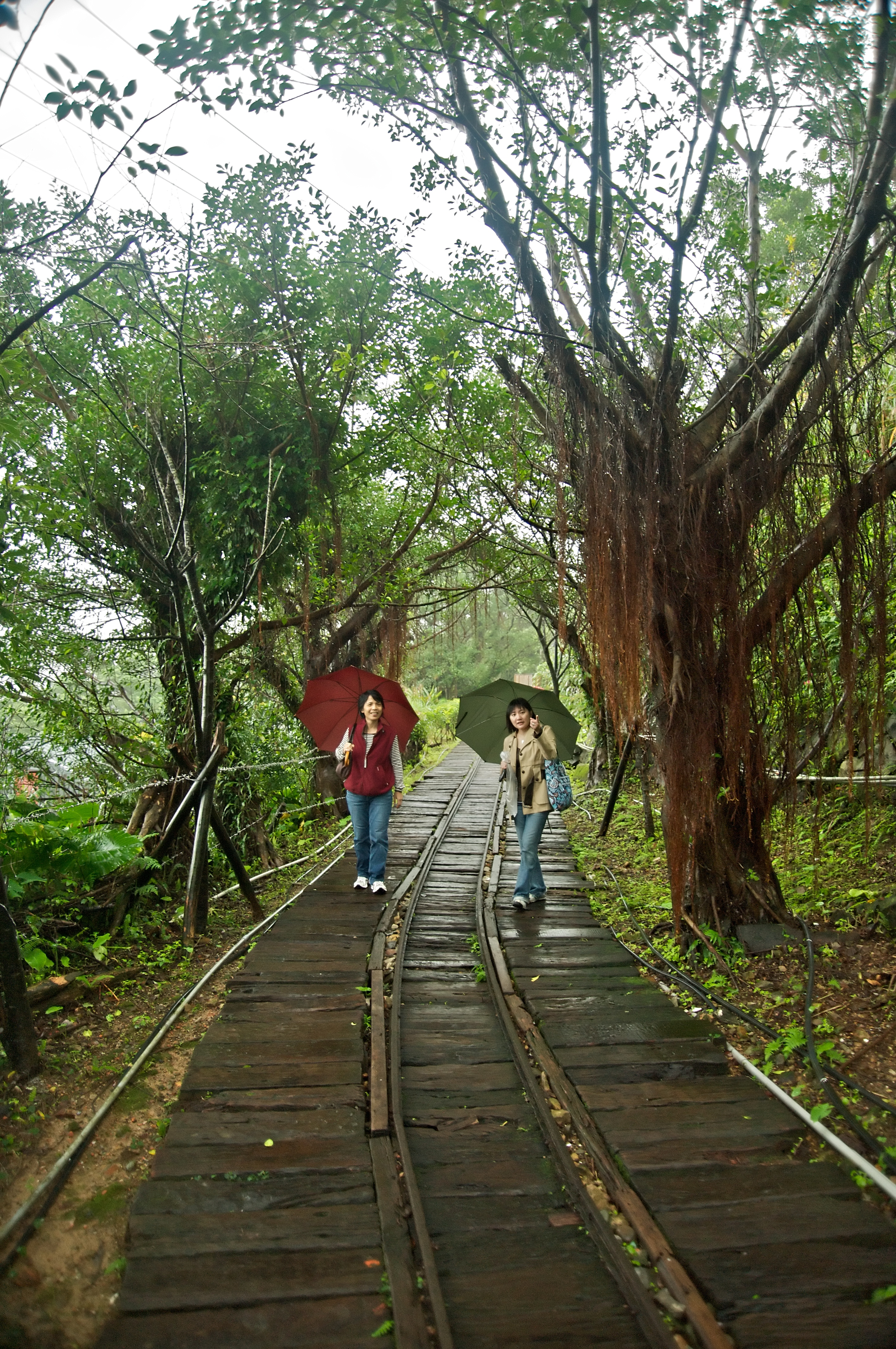
Abandoned railway tracks

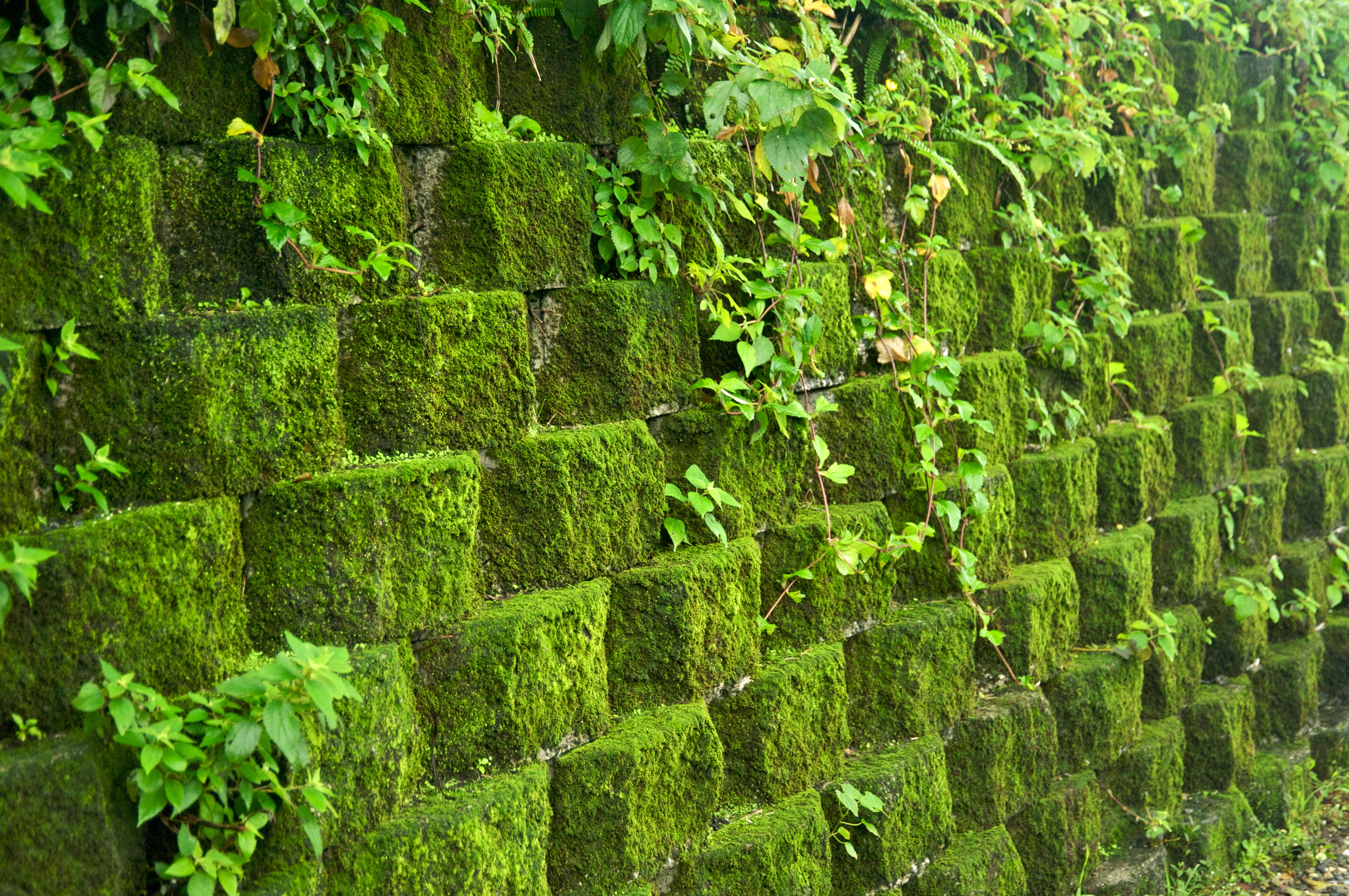
Moss covering a retaining wall at the mine, a result of high humidity

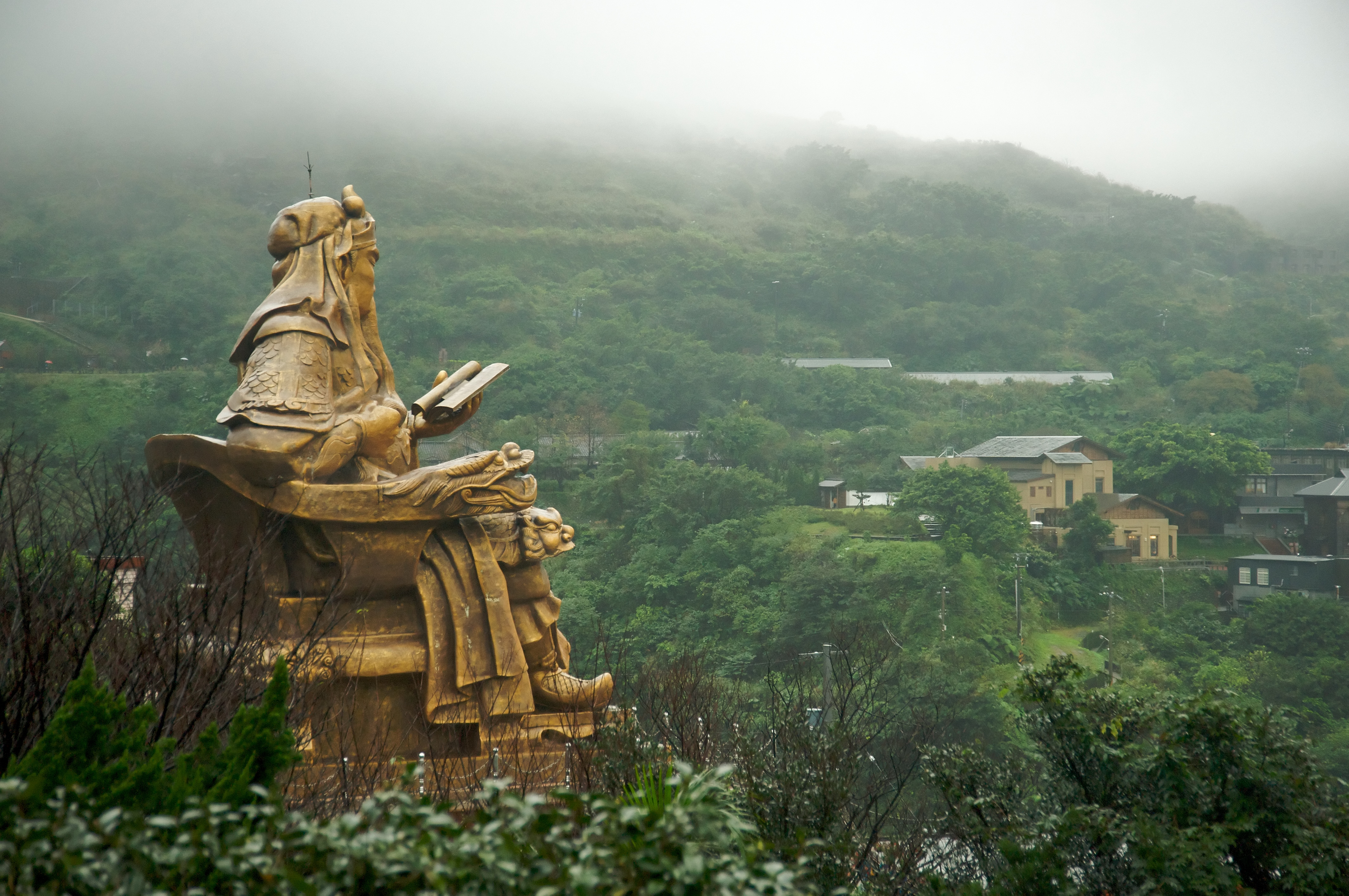
Giant statue

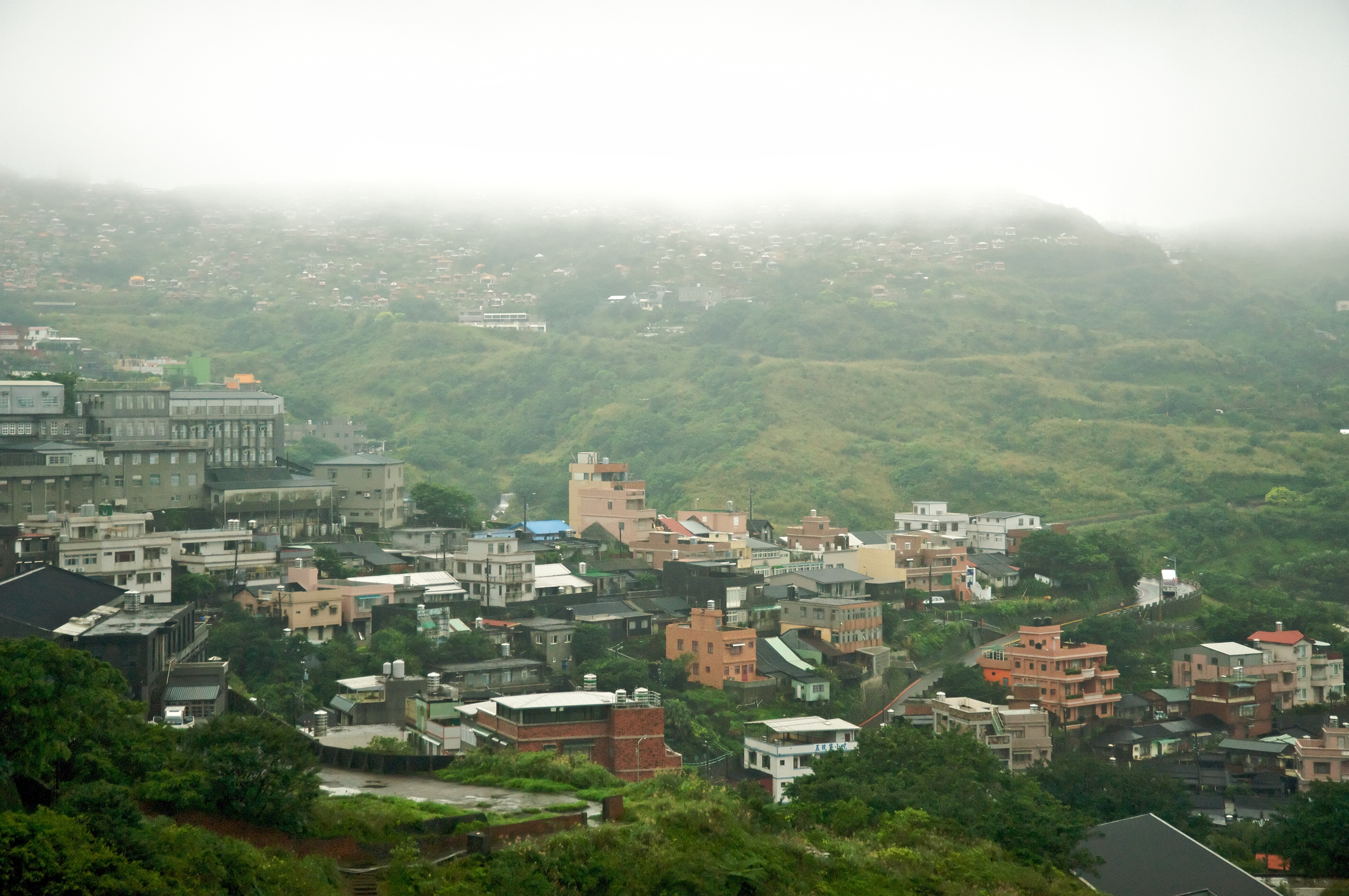
Valley

== See also ==
- Gold Museum (Taiwan)
- Mining in Taiwan
