= Barfield =

Barfield may refer to:

== People ==
- Doug Barfield, an American football player
- Jesse Barfield, an American baseball player
- Josh Barfield, an American baseball executive
- Owen Barfield, an English philosopher and author
- Ron Barfield, an American race driver
- Velma Barfield, an American serial killer
- Wanda Barfield, an American pediatrician
- Warren Barfield, an American musician

== Places ==
- Barfield, Alabama, an unincorporated community in Clay County, Alabama
- Barfield, Tennessee

== Other ==
- Barfield, an aircraft maintenance company
- Barfield, a skit parodying Garfield from the television show, Loiter Squad

== See also ==
- Barford (disambiguation)
