= Qu'Appelle, Saskatchewan =

Town in Saskatchewan, Canada

Qu'Appelle Troy, Qu'Appelle Station, South Qu'Appelle
- Town
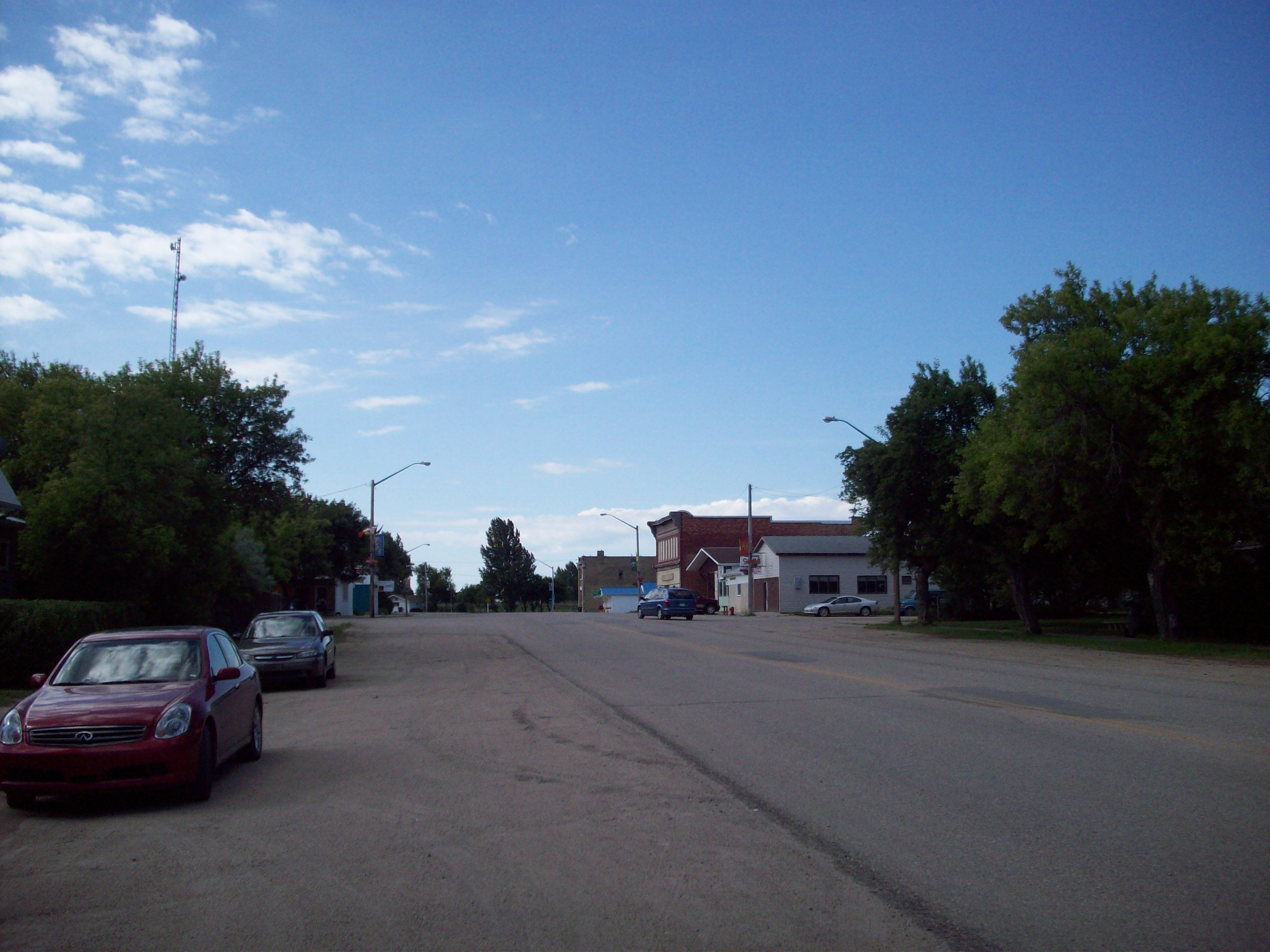
- Main Street, Qu'Appelle, 2008.

- Location within Saskatchewan Location within Canada
- Coordinates: 50°32′33″N 103°52′25″W
- Country: Canada
- Province: Saskatchewan
- Census division: 6
- Rural municipality: South Qu'Appelle No. 157
- Post office founded: 1882
- Incorporated (village): N/A
- Incorporated (town): February 20, 1903

Government
  - Mayor: Brian Bogdan
  - Administrator: Michelle Williamson
  - Governing body: Qu'Appelle Town Council

Area
  - Total: 4.22 km^{2} (1.63 sq mi)
- Elevation: 662.9 m (2,175 ft)

Population (2011)
  - Total: 668
  - Density: 158.1/km^{2} (409/sq mi)
- Time zone: CST
- Postal code: S0G 4A0
- Area code: 306
- Highways: Highway 1, Highway 35

Qu'Appelle (/kwəˈpɛl/) is a town in Saskatchewan, located on Highway 35 approximately 50 kilometres (31 mi) east of the provincial capital of Regina.

Qu'Appelle was for a time the terminus of the Canadian Pacific Railway (CPR) and the major distribution centre for what was then the District of Assiniboia in the North-West Territories and is now southern Saskatchewan. The town is situated in a lush rolling parkland, with intermittent coulees containing steady-flowing creeks running into the Qu'Appelle Valley, poplar bluffs, and sloughs.

Qu'Appelle had at one stage been credibly anticipated to be the major metropole of the North-West Territories by both the federal Government of Canada and the Church of England in the Dominion of Canada (since 1955 the Anglican Church of Canada). It was under serious consideration by the Government of Canada as district headquarters of the District of Assiniboia and territorial headquarters of the North-West Territories. The Church of England had in anticipation of Qu'Appelle's future urban importance designated it the cathedral city for the Diocese of Qu'Appelle, which geographically corresponded precisely to the District of Assiniboia in the North-West Territories.

Political events, however, passed Qu'Appelle entirely by when Lieutenant-Governor Edgar Dewdney selected the locale of his own landholdings at Pile-O-Bones (then renamed "Regina" by Princess Louise, daughter of Queen Victoria, when her husband John Campbell, Marquess of Lorne was Governor General) as his territorial capital: Qu'Appelle's significance other than in historical terms then largely lapsed.

== Etymology ==
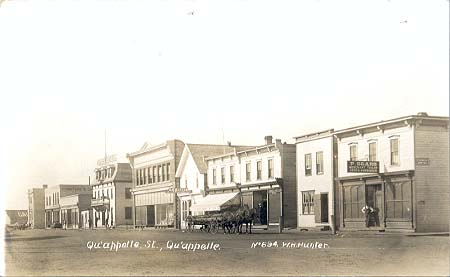
West side of Main Street, Qu'Appelle, turn of the 20th century. All buildings apart from the former Red & White Grocery Store, mid-block, and the now-derelict post office at the far south end of the street are now gone.

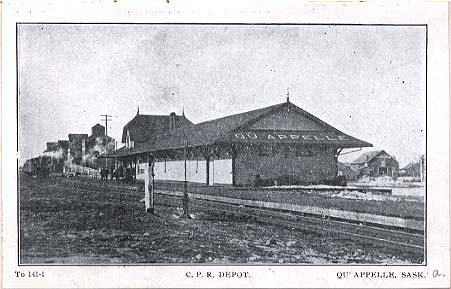
Qu'Appelle CPR station before 1910

The CPR arrived in 1882–83, and the post office was founded at what was originally called Troy on August 1, 1882. For a time Qu'Appelle appeared likely to be the administrative headquarters for the District of Assiniboia, which corresponded to the southern portion of the present day province of Saskatchewan.

Two versions of the origin of the name "Troy" are proposed: That

1. it was named after Troy, Ontario by Wellington Mulholland, a land surveyor and land agent and
2. the name was chosen by the brothers Stephen and James Caswell who were merchants in the area and managed the post office.

Original settlers hung onto the old name of "Troy" well into the 20th century.

When the Canadian Pacific Railway arrived in 1884 the new town was renamed Qu'Appelle Station in reference to the nearby Qu'Appelle Valley, which was the location of a long-established Hudson's Bay Company factory. The name "Qu'Appelle," a corruption of qui appelle, French for "Who calls?" refers to the once-popular legend of the Qu'Appelle Valley versified by E. Pauline Johnson:

I am the one who loved her as my life,

Had watched her grow to sweet young womanhood;
Won the dear privilege to call her wife,
And found the world, because of her, was good.
I am the one who heard the spirit voice,
Of which the paleface settlers love to tell;
From whose strange story they have made their choice

Of naming this fair valley the 'Qu'Appelle....'

In 1902 the name was changed to South Qu'Appelle and in 1911 the longstanding confusion as to the name "Qu'Appelle," which also referred to the former Hudson's Bay Company fort town in the Qu'Appelle Valley, to the northeast of Qu'Appelle, was resolved when the two communities agreed to deem the then-CPR station site as Qu'Appelle and the town in the valley as Fort Qu'Appelle.

== History ==
=== Establishment ===
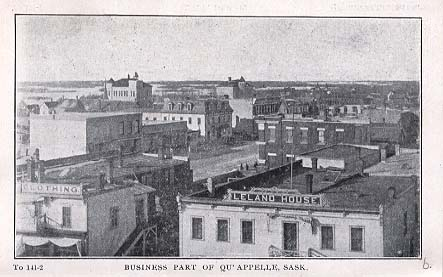
The once-thriving business district of Qu'Appelle, circa 1905. The Queen's Hotel, where General Middleton billeted during the Riel Rebellion, is the mansard-roofed building in the centre of the photograph. Virtually all buildings in the photograph are now gone.

Like many small Canadian prairie towns, Qu'Appelle has had a considerably livelier past than its present. A Hudson's Bay Company trading post temporarily stood southwest of the future site of the town from 1854 through 1864 when it was re-located back to its previous site, the modern Fort Qu'Appelle in the Qu'Appelle Valley.

Qu'Appelle was a district used to elect two members of the NWT Council in 1885. Later the district was divided into South Qu'Appelle and North Qu'Appelle.

Qu'Appelle was at one point among the likely choices as capital of the North-West Territories, as indicated by its original status as the historical see city of the Church of England in Canada (Anglican since 1955) Diocese of Qu'Appelle. The choice of Pile-of-Bones, as Regina was originally called, as the Territorial headquarters was a national scandal in the 1880s: there was an "obvious conflict of interest" in Lieutenant-Governor Edgar Dewdney's promoting of Pile-of-Bones as the territorial headquarters though not to the extent of preventing a major street in Regina being named "Dewdney Avenue" or in resuming his political career in British Columbia after leaving office in the North-West Territories in 1888.

A 1980 local town history reports that

In his January 5, 1892 edition of the Regina Leader, Nicholas Flood Davin explained what in his mind, and in the minds of most of the people in this area, was the real reason Qu'Appelle was not chosen, or rather why Pile of Bones was Dewdney's choice. According to Mr. Davin, Lieutenant-Governor Dewdney and fourteen other men formed a syndicate and bought Hudson Bay section along the C.P.R. Mainline....He chose the town site of Regina...about a mile (1.6 km) west of the present station—that is, on their own section '26'.

Until 1897, however, when responsible government was accomplished in the Territories, the lieutenant-governor and council governed by fiat and there was little legitimate means of challenging such decisions outside the federal capital of Ottawa, where the Territories were remote and of little concern.

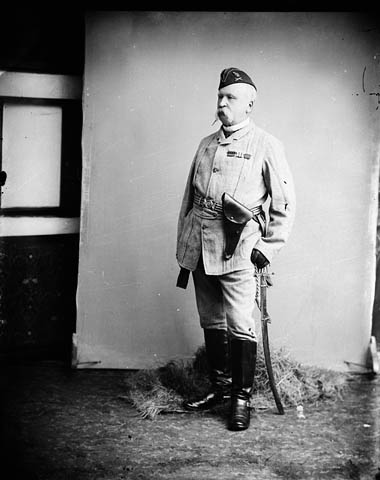
Sir Frederick Middleton

=== North-West Rebellion ===
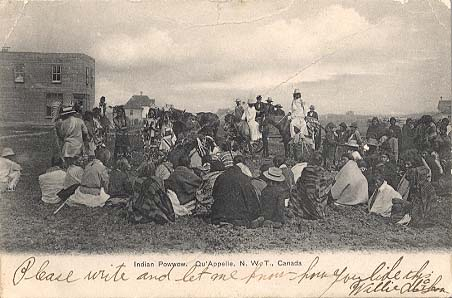
Aboriginal people gathering for a powwow at Qu'Appelle prior to 1905

Despite its loss of initial prominence as a likely territorial headquarters Qu'Appelle attained national prominence in 1885 during the North-West Rebellion. Until the construction of the Qu’Appelle, Long Lake, and Saskatchewan Railway in 1890 linked the newly established Regina with Saskatoon and Prince Albert, Qu'Appelle was the major debarkation and distribution centre for the North-West Territories.

General Frederick Dobson Middleton, who billeted in Qu'Appelle's Queen's Hotel (which survived into the 21st century), made Qu'Appelle the marshalling point to the locus of the North-West Rebellion in the north-west for troops arriving by train from eastern Canada.

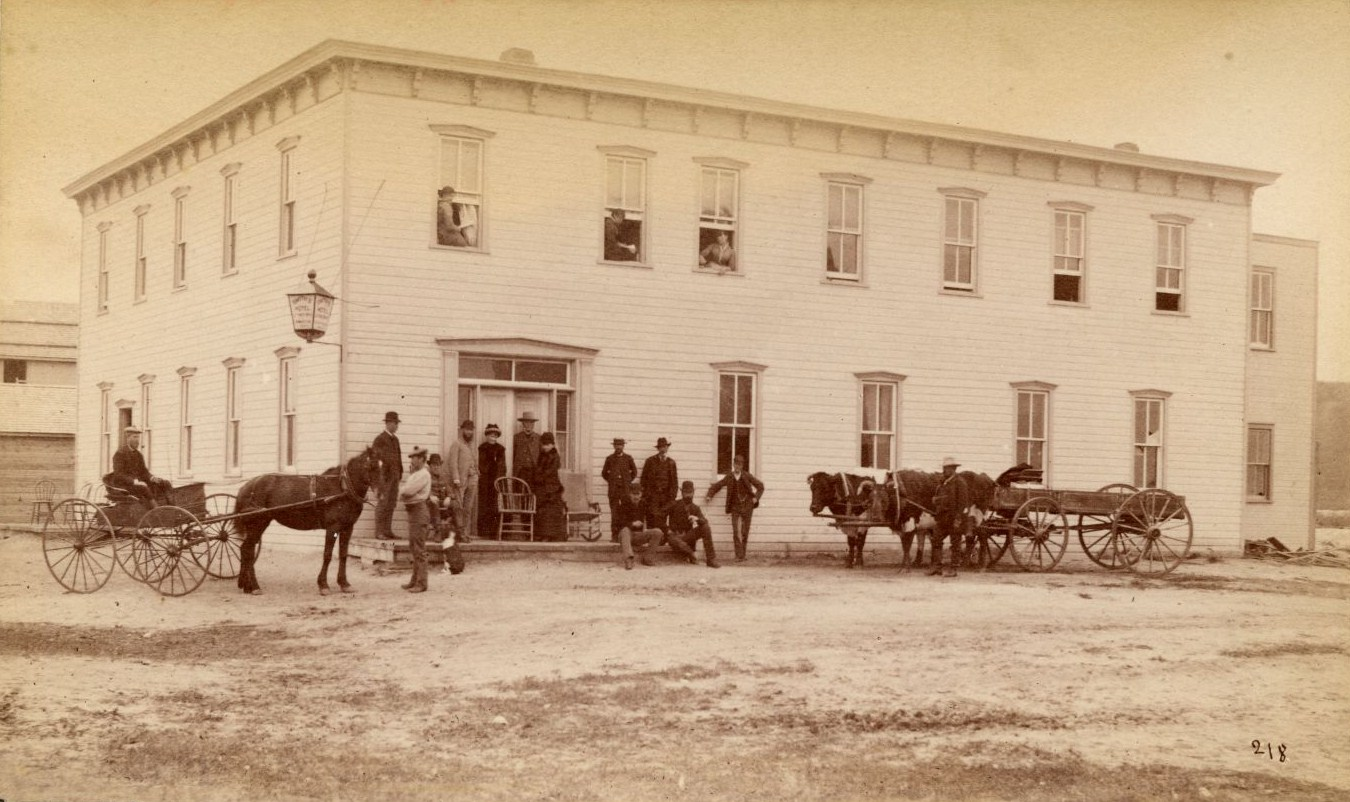
Smiths Hotel, Qu'Appelle, 1885.

For some years Qu'Appelle was the centre of national attention as journalists based there reported back home to eastern Canada on developments in the North-West Rebellion. Qu'Appelle's significance in the 1880s before the anticipated prominence of it and Fort Qu'Appelle was substantially reduced by Lieutenant-Governor Dewdney's preference for Pile-of-Bones—in the case of Qu'Appelle ultimately virtually eliminated—is even today in the Canadian Encyclopedia indicated by a simple reference to it: "General Middleton's original plan was simple. He wanted to march all his troops north from the railhead at Qu'Appelle to Batoche." The resolution of the North-West Rebellion perhaps needless to say did not comprehensively resolve conflicts among settlers and aboriginal people. Many Qu'Appelle children of the late 19th and early 20th centuries recounted frightening encounters with angry Cree and Métis, who not unreasonably bore a considerable grudge against white settlers in the Qu'Appelle region.

=== Early town life and economy ===
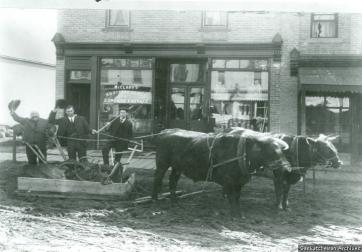
Using a stoneboat to haul a plough down a Qu'Appelle street circa 1910 prior to street-paving.

From 1882, early residents of Qu'Appelle included numerous English remittance men whose cultured backgrounds contributed significantly to the life of the town. Amateur theatricals and musical evenings were a regular feature of winter social life and it was important to early Qu'Appelle residents that there be an "opera house": an auditorium in the town hall.

"[T]he great influx of settlers into the District of Assiniboia in the early 1900s meant continued growth. The population of the community was 434 in 1901, but by the end of the first decade of the 20th century, it was near 1,000"

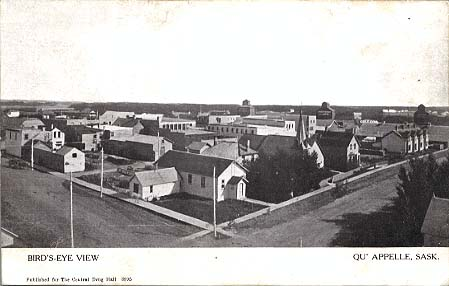
St Peter's Church of England Pro-Cathedral, Qu'Appelle with the Terrace, circa 1905

At a time when farmers were vastly greater in number than later: a standard farm was a quarter section, a section being 1 square mile (640 acres; 2.6 km^{2}). As in Fort Qu'Appelle, town life in many ways resembled that of an Indian hill station during the British Raj. Perhaps improbably in so small a community but indicative of the not always tolerant and inclusive social mores of early settlement in the Canadian west, discrete neighbourhoods of Qu'Appelle were called "Germantown" and "Breedville," the latter in racist early reference to the prairie Anglo-Métis, whom white settlers at the time called "half-breeds," a term now considered disparaging, and generally avoided.

Relations between the English immigrants of the Anglican pro-cathedral parish and the native-born Canadian Presbyterian, Methodist and Roman Catholic settlers from Ontario and Quebec were at times frosty and the Anglican Church was long referred to in some disparagement as "the English Church" by eastern Canadian settlers who perhaps regarded themselves as more authentically Canadian. At one point Bishop Harding, the Church of England (Anglican) bishop, was quoted at a meeting—when he was imprudently unaware that local Canadians were hearing his remarks—as observing that English Anglican migrants might be more attractive settlers than Presbyterian and Methodist Canadians, occasioning considerable adverse notice and animosity against the English in the general community.

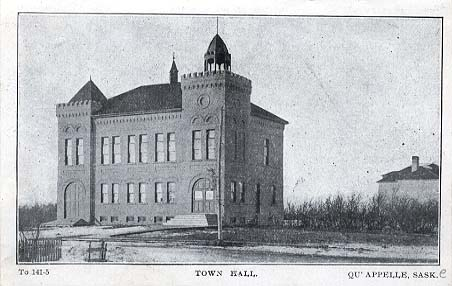
Town Hall, Qu'Appelle, circa 1910

The fine yellow brick town hall and "opera house" remains marginally in use, though its auditorium has long since been closed to public use because it falls short of modern standards of safety and the town cannot bring it up. Its companion building, Qu'Appelle High School, built in similar style in identical yellow brick, closed in 1973 and was demolished in 1975. The Queen's Hotel, built in 1884 (early on with the competitor of Smiths Hotel, far more briefly surviving) continued to operate, latterly largely as a town pub albeit that alcohol was briefly banned for drink in Saskatchewan after World War I, as vastly more lengthily in the USA. After steady commercial decline for many years it was destroyed by fire in 2003.

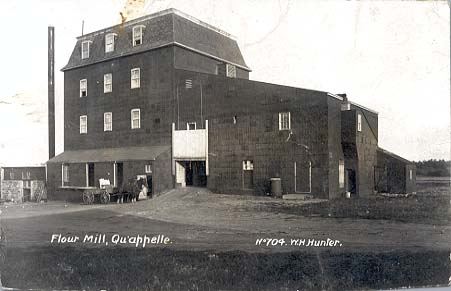
Flour Mill, Qu'Appelle, circa 1910

The first Qu'Appelle businesses of 1882 were a restaurant operated by J. Stoddard; pool hall by Love & Raymond; livery and feed store by Johnston & Paterson; livery and feed store by Joe Doolittle; and harness shop by John Milliken. An observatory was opened in 1882 by Leslie Gordon and provided morning and evening weather readings for the CPR until 1907, when the observatory was supplemented with anemometer and weather recording devices. The Qu'Appelle Felt and Boot factory opened at the end of 1897 but liquidated in 1900. A fire in 1883 destroyed much of the new business district but soon there were six stores, three hotels, five implement agencies, two butcher shops, a flour and feed store and a bakery.

Well into the 20th century there was still a train station, some half-dozen grain elevators, a bank, post office, butcher, two general stores, a hardware store, pharmacy, the hotel—"the Queen’s Hotel, which officially opened in 1884, was lost in an early morning blaze on April 16, 2003"—(and "beverage room", in the terminology of the early 20th-century Canadian West, though closed from 1915 to 1925 under Premier Walter Scott's prohibition and temperance legislation), barber shop, firehall, law office, numerous service stations, several cafés, cinema (later converted to a grocery store) and a covered rink. In the 1890s, there was "a flour mill, a creamery [and] a felt and boot factory."

The Qu'Appelle Anglican Diocese maintained the St John's College Farm immediately to the west of town. By 1910 the town's population had risen to nearly 1,000. Qu'Appelle was an important local business, shopping and distribution centre which staged an annual summer fair.

=== Early surrounding farm community ===
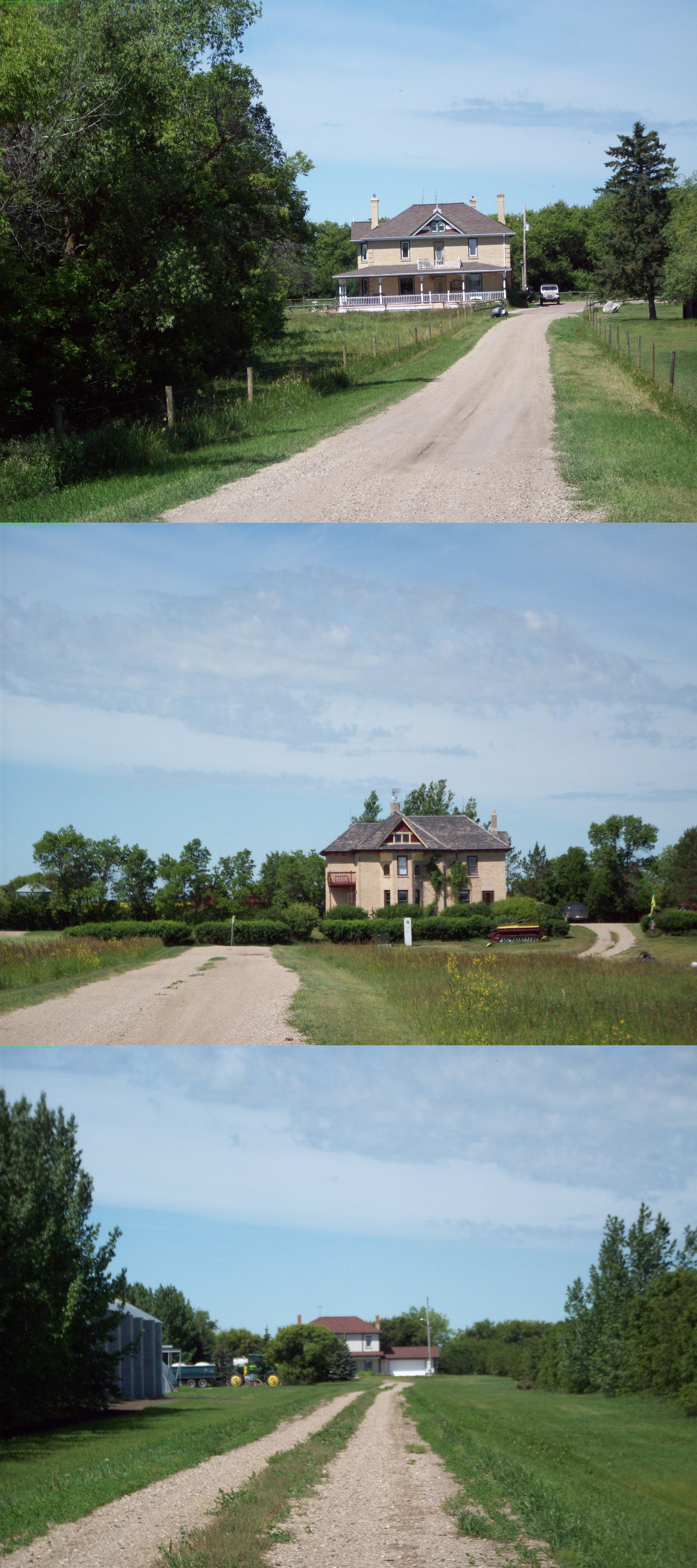
Qu'Appelle district farmhouses of the 1890s and first decade of the 20th century with brick rather than wooden walls.

Unlike parts of the North-West Territories and, then, Province of Saskatchewan settled by Eastern Europeans in the Laurier-Sifton migration of the 1890s/1900s, much of the settlement in the Qu'Appelle District was by well-capitalised eastern Canadians and Britons. Rather than the small sod and plain lumber houses and outbuildings of later homesteaders, farm as well as town residential and outbuilding construction here was frequently large, ostentatious and built of brick or stone, often with large formal gardens, indicating not only the large families of the time but the anticipation of considerable prosperity and the ability to employ domestic help.

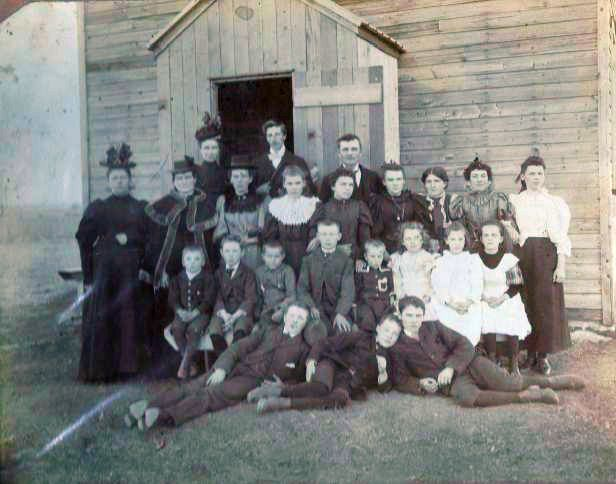
Rural school of the 1890s, Springbrook, some halfway between Qu'Appelle and Fort Qu'Appelle.

Town amenities of the early decades of settlement were contingent on the farming hinterland being far more densely populated than today; travel to Regina was accomplished via a train journey and domestic transport mostly by horse-drawn conveyances. With the vastly depleted rural population and improved transport these amenities have almost wholly lapsed. The rationalisation by the grain companies of their depots for buying grain from farmers and the resulting disappearance of Qu'Appelle's grain elevators hastened the process of decline as even the regular visits by farmers to town to deliver grain ceased.

View from the east 1901-01

=== Settlement colonies ===
As with the nearby large farming projects Bell Farm and Cannington Manor, there were also large farming ventures near Qu'Appelle. W. Thistle and Thomas Wright started the Wright farm in 1882 on four sections of land (one section having been one 2.6 km^{2} or 1 sq mi, 260 hectares or 640 acres). By 1884, there were 310 hectares (770 acres) in crops and 420 ha (1,050 acres) tilled and ready for seed.

In 1884, the Wrights...owned a steam threshing machine four binders, twelve teams of horses, four yokes of oxen, forty-five head of cattle six sulky plow six common plows, four seeders and a number of mowers and harrows. They also had three frame granaries with a capacity of 2500 bushels

— 2,500 US bushels (88,000 L; 20,000 US dry gal; 19,000 imp gal)

W.R. Sykes laid down $32,000 for farm equipment to establish the W.R. Sykes English Company farm. ($32,000 is equivalent to $1.07 million in present-day terms. W.R. Sykes purchased eighteen sections of land north of Qu'Appelle and brought in the first steam plows to Western Canada. An advertisement featuring the Lord Brassey farm and estate was run in England and attracted farmers to the Church Colonisation Society venture called the Christ Church Settlement. In the 4 3/4 sections (4 3/4 sq mi or 12 km^{2}) bought by the Church Colonisation Society 16 ha (40 acres) were set aside for each family. Amongst initial setbacks, the major blow came when the Dominion Land Survey offered 65 ha (160 acres) to settlers, making the 16 ha (40 acres) a mere pittance in comparison. In 1885 #1 hard wheat was selling for $0.62 a bushel. As a comparison to these large farms, the average homesteader on his single quarter section of land could barely afford a team of oxen which in 1882 cost around $250. At the time a good team of horses would run about $600. ($250 is equivalent to $8,300 in present-day terms and $600 is equivalent to $20,000.)

== Decline ==
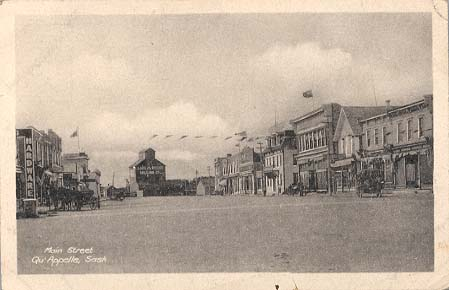
Main Street, Qu'Appelle during its heyday, shortly after 1905

=== Nomination of Regina as territorial capital ===
The catastrophe of Lieutenant-Governor Edgar Dewdney nominating Pile-of-Bones, later Regina, as his territorial capital was only the first of the disasters to befall Qu'Appelle. The opening of the Qu'Appelle, Long Lake and Saskatchewan Railway in 1890, which linked Regina, Saskatoon and Prince Albert, ended Qu'Appelle's important role as a distribution centre. Bishop Burn's closing of the Qu'Appelle Model Farm and transfer of Bishop's Court (the bishop's "palace") from Qu'Appelle to Indian Head in 1895 accelerated the decline. Thereafter Qu'Appelle's pretensions as the would-be metropole for the District of Assiniboia were comprehensively dispelled.

=== Alienation of Anglican see status ===
The Anglican metropole was first unofficially transferred from Qu'Appelle to Indian Head, when Bishop Burn moved Bishop's Court; it was subsequently further transferred to Regina. The process was completed in 1944 when St Peter's lost pro-cathedral status, which was then conferred on St Paul's Regina.

=== Depletion of farm hinterland and erosion of town's commercial viability ===
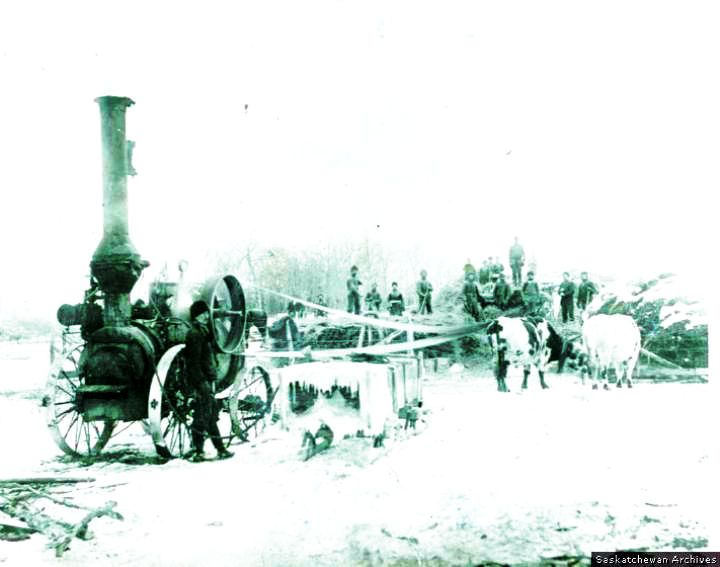
Near Qu'Appelle, this steam threshing unit was still busy with the harvest in January, c. 1895. Note the large number of men required in the threshing process.

By the immediate post-War period the rationalising of prairie dryland farming practices and the depletion of the rural population—as throughout the Canadian prairies—was further accelerating Qu'Appelle's decline. The CPR Railway station, the grain elevators, the Post Office, the Royal Bank of Canada, the Red and White grocery store, the Hamblin general store, the barber shop and four gas stations remained (albeit that two of them were Esso and Royalite stations on the now-relocated trans-Canada highway to the south of the town). These were not to last beyond 1970.

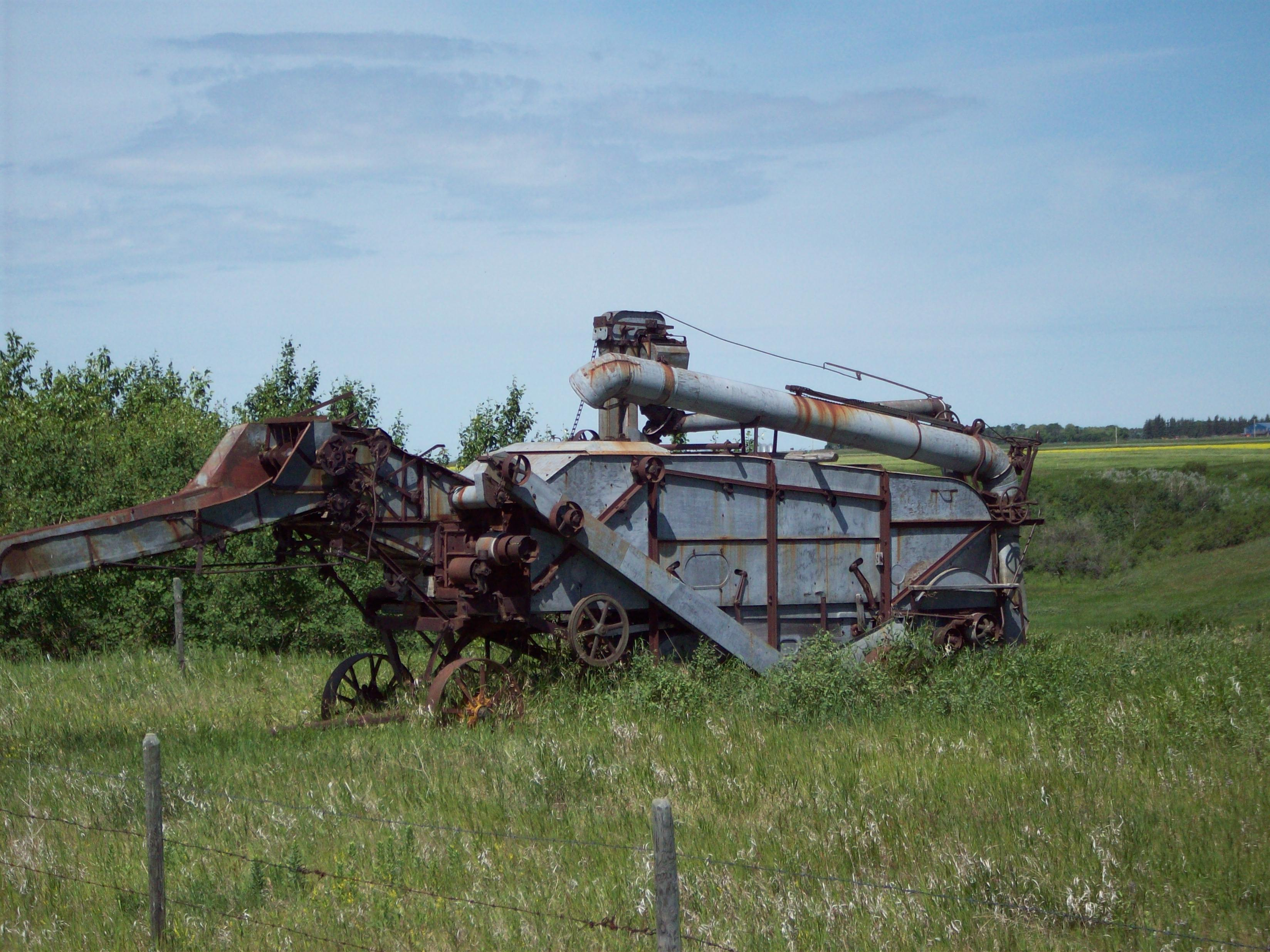
Old threshing machine on a farm near Qu'Appelle

Qu'Appelle is no longer on but north of the Trans-Canada Highway though as previously on Highway 35, now vastly less busy than until the mid-1960s, indeed, from day to day hardly driven on at all from the Trans-Canada northwards other than by the vastly diminished farm community who no longer use Qu'Appelle. The upgrading of the Trans-Canada Highway in the immediate post-World War II years with the highway being re-routed to the south took east–west traffic outside the town.

In its heyday, Qu'Appelle was located on the Canadian Pacific Railway (CPR) some 400m (a quarter of a mile) to the north. The CPR continued to provide passenger and freight services only briefly after the War as private auto ownership became normative, and freight transport increasingly was delegated from the railways to highway trucking, and Qu'Appelle CPR station eventually closed and was demolished.

The long-disused movie theatre building on Main Street across the street from the Kraus BA garage briefly was turned into a general store in the 1960s when Hamblin's General Store and the Red & White Store closed but this soon ended. The bypassing of Qu'Appelle by Highway 10 to the Qu'Appelle Valley, the closing of the grain elevators and the gas stations, the high school and all the remaining grocery stores determinatively spelled the end of Qu'Appelle as a viable commercial centre.

The previously mentioned Queen's Hotel, built in 1884, contained a commercial pub, albeit closed from World War I until the mid-1920s by the brief provincial temperance statute. The pub was essentially the sole remaining operation of the hotel; for many years it steadily declined in use together with virtually all town commercial operations until the hotel's destruction by fire in 2003.

=== Contemporary issues ===
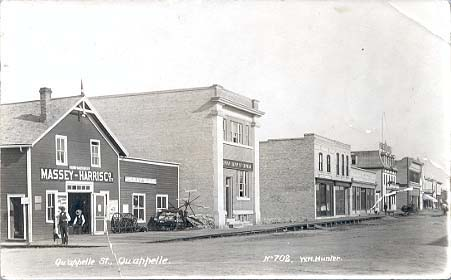
Massey-Harris farm implement dealership and post office, turn of the 20th century

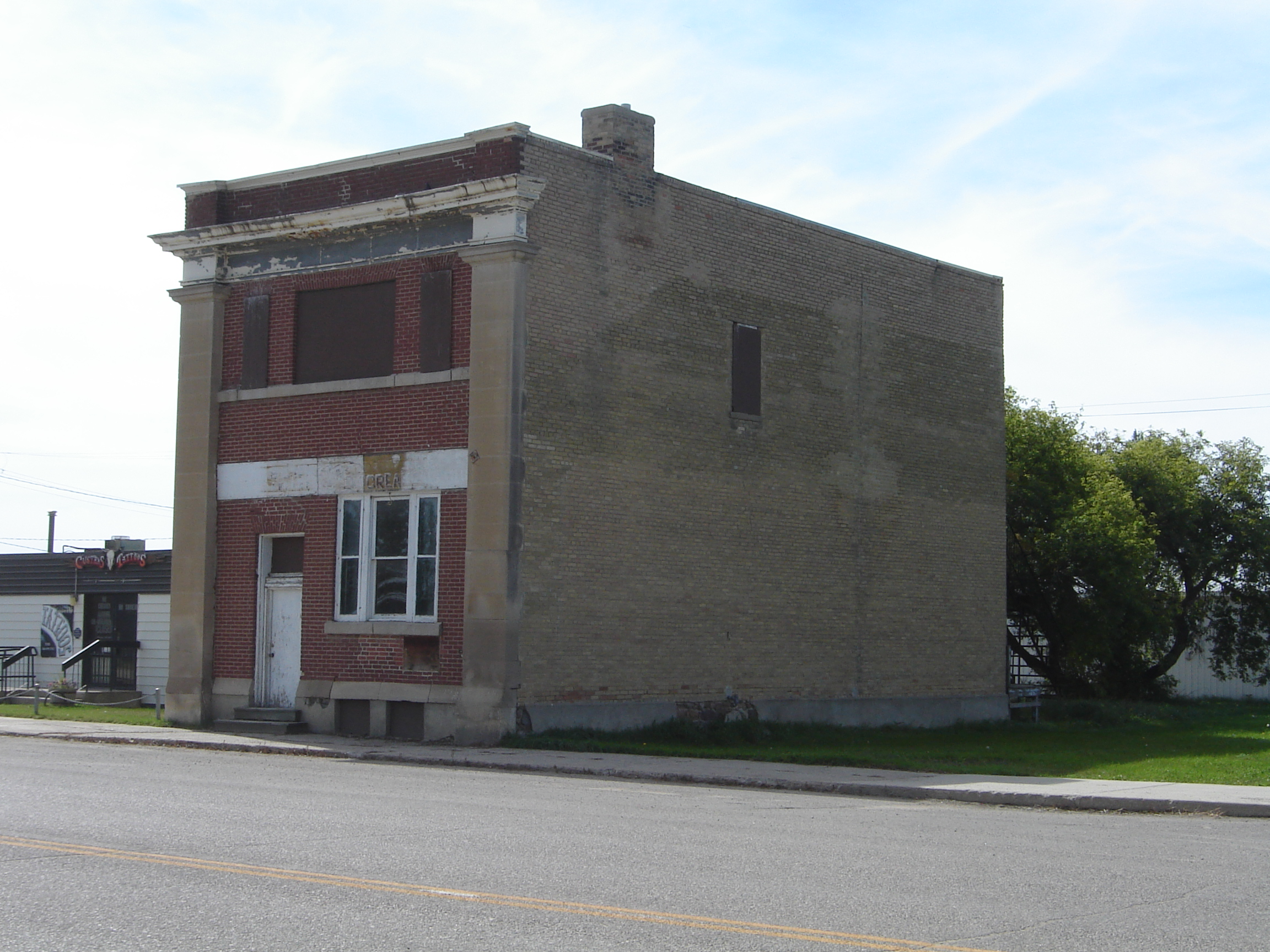
Qu'Appelle Post Office, now derelict.

Until the 1940s the Trans-Canada Highway passed through Qu'Appelle—it was then relocated some half-mile to the south—and till the 1960s Qu'Appelle commerce was marginally saved from moribundity by local farmers bringing their grain to sell in the several now-demolished grain elevators and by Regina cottagers passing through en route to the Qu'Appelle Valley when the Trans-Canada Highway to Qu'Appelle and then Highway 35 north to the Valley was the only convenient route. This ended in 1968 when the Highway No. 10 cut across directly from Balgonie to the Valley. In recent years Qu'Appelle has enjoyed a mild resurgence as a result of commuters from Regina discovering it as a bedroom community, but local commerce has never recovered and there are no longer any retail outlets, service stations, banks, barbers or beauty parlours in the town.

To encourage population growth, the town council for a time advertised lots for sale at one dollar as a means of attracting new residents, and several mobile homes in town are the result. According to the Encyclopedia of Saskatchewan "about 80% to 90% of the town's workforce drives to and from the city each day" With the resulting dearth of local commerce the once solidly built up main street is now almost entirely lined with vacant lots and abandoned buildings. A succession of fires from the 1950s through the 2000s comprehensively removed wooden historic commercial buildings from Main Street.

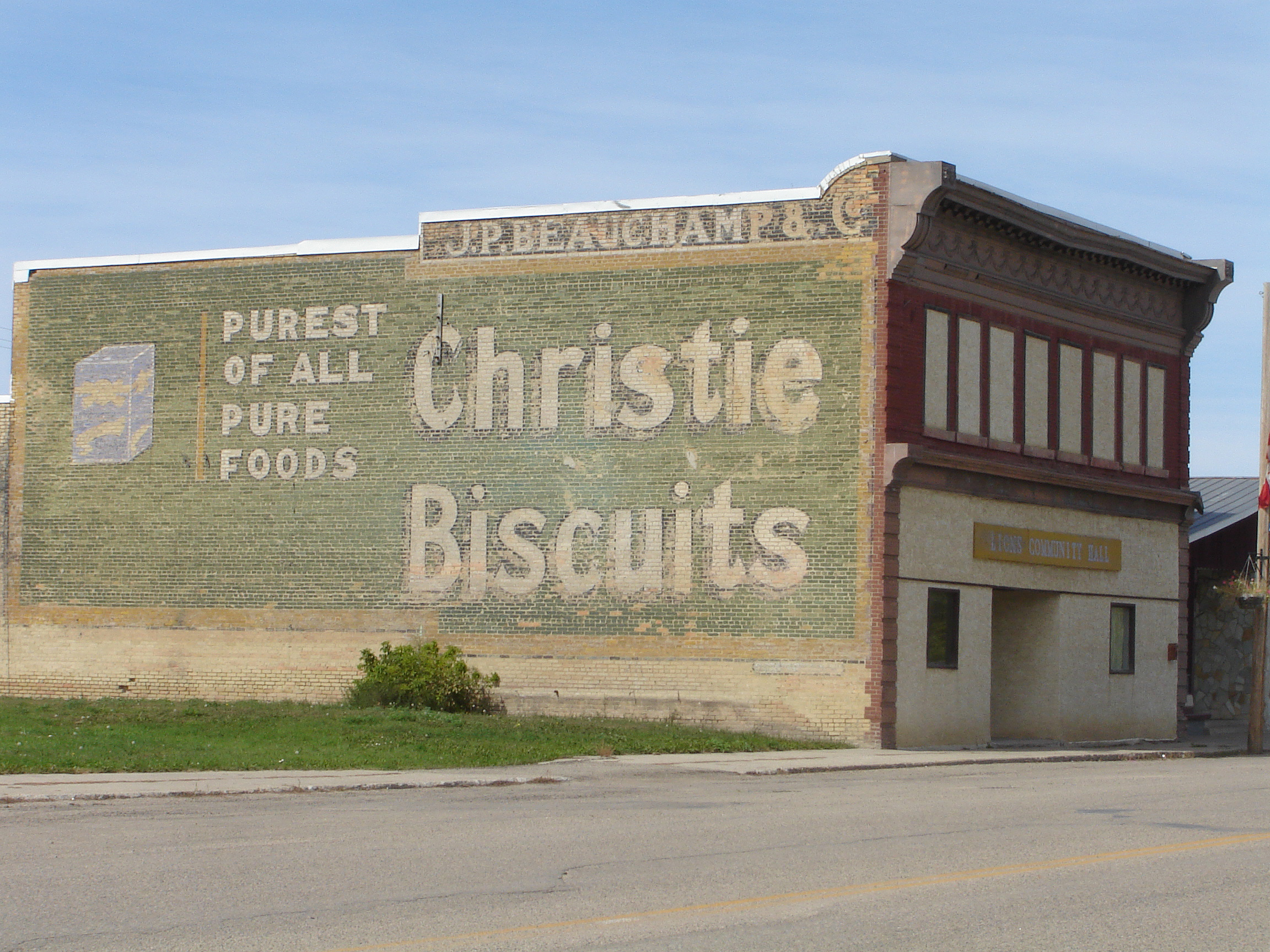
Former Red & White Store, the one remaining retail building on Main Street, now with the dereliction of the Town Hall used as a community centre.

As late as the 1960s there was still a hospital, post office, butcher, Red & White grocery store, general store, barbershop, and several garages, including Royalite and BA stations on the Trans-Canada Highway and two garages in town operated by the Kuntz and Kraus families. The historic Queen's Hotel, built in 1884 and perhaps the last of the major commercial structures of Main Street, burned to the ground in 2003.

James Hamblin School, the town primary school built in the 1960s and named for the proprietor of the long-operating (but now long-defunct) Main Street general store, remains in operation with nine staff and an enrolment of 156 in 2007. The Saskatchewan library association maintains a travelling library in the Town Hall with internet access to the province-wide collection and provides facilities for ordering books from such collection. This is in contrast with the otherwise sadly depleted resources of today's Qu'Appelle by comparison with the burgeoning community of the past.

During the Great Depression in Canada, Susan Buchan (Lady Tweedsmuir), Vicereine of Canada and wife of John Buchan (Lord Tweedsmuir), the then-eminent novelist who was Governor General of Canada, established a library project by which used books were collected in Eastern Canada and distributed by the train carload throughout western Canada free of charge so long as local persons would pick up the freight charge.

Assorted Qu'Appelle persons were able to do so. Qu'Appelle library in the Town Hall and the rural schools of the Qu'Appelle District accumulated libraries through Lady Tweedsmuir's project when local patrons were able to pay the freight; the 1940s, 1950s, and 1960s rural schools and indeed farm houses still had libraries remaining from her project.

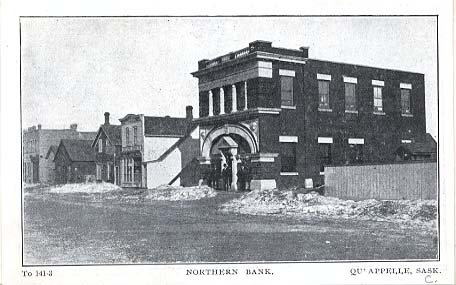
Northern Bank on the east side of Main Street, from 1925 the Royal Bank of Canada, now long-closed. All buildings to the north of the bank in the photo are now gone.

Qu'Appelle today need no longer depend on such a provident society charitable facility as the provincial library service maintains a library in the town hall. The long-disused movie theatre on Main Street across the street from the former Kraus Esso service station briefly enjoyed a second life as a general store during the 1960s when James Hamblin's general store closed on his death but it lasted only for a decade.

The Qu'Appelle Royal Bank of Canada branch, built in 1906 by the Northern Bank and taken over by the Royal Bank of Canada in 1925, is located on the east side of Main Street. The branch continued to operate until the 1960s when reduced commercial activity in Qu'Appelle and declining population in the hinterland made it no longer viable. The building is now in use as a commercial laboratory.

By the 1960s there still remained a small business core, gas station, grocery store, butcher shop, insurance agency, post office, two restaurants, bar, greenhouses, transport grain storage, hair dresser, a print shop, tattoo parlour, and analytical laboratory. The Odd Fellows, a local service club, is long dissolved. There still remains a Masons lodge, a Lions Club, the Community Players and a Historical Society. Skating rink, baseball diamonds, with a nearby indoor horseback riding arenas, elementary school and RM office.

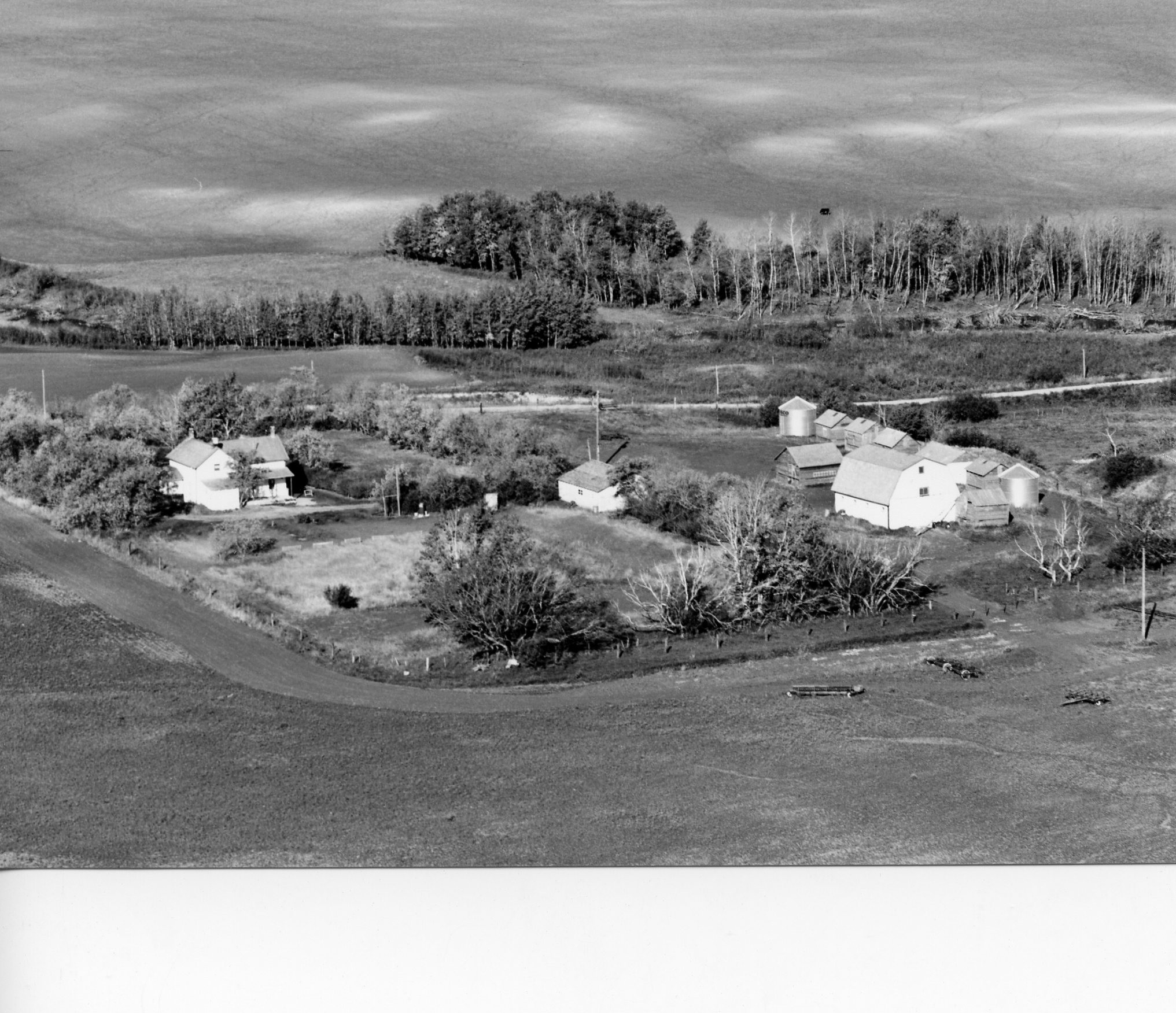
Qu'Appelle district wooden farmstead in the 1960s

The "Opera House" — the auditorium in the Town Hall — is long closed and remains unused, having failed to conform to contemporary safety regulations. The disused former Red & White grocery store on main street, one of the few buildings still standing, is now converted to use as a community hall in default of the Town Hall auditorium's continuing utility.

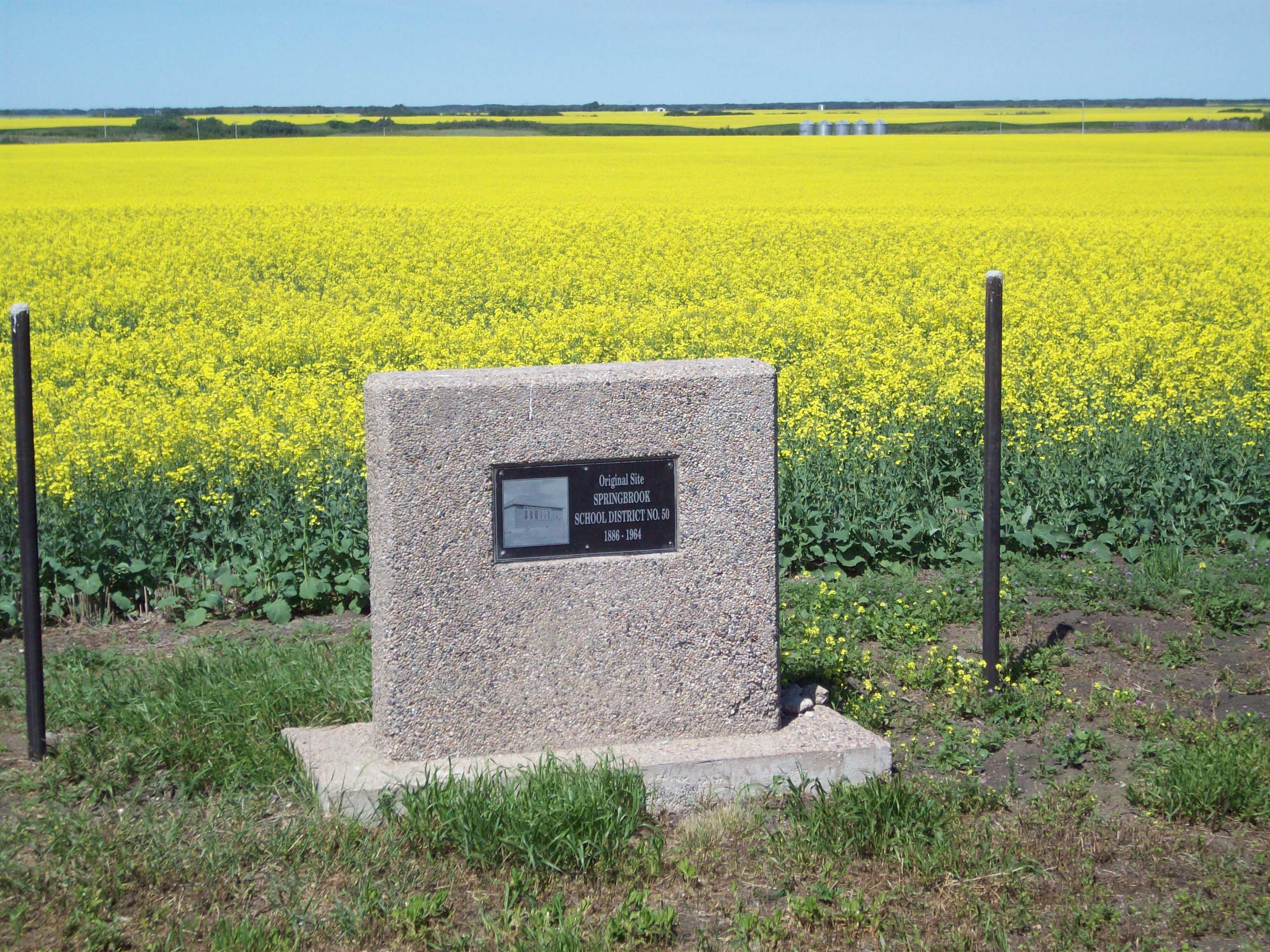
Commemorative plaque marking the site of the second Springbrook School (see 1892 photo above) closed in June 1963 (notwithstanding incorrect information on plaque indicating it was the "original site" and that it closed in 1964).

By the 1960s many farmers were working in winter in "town"—not Qu'Appelle, whose commercial vitality had by now entirely lapsed, but certainly Fort Qu'Appelle and indeed Regina—and winter social activities in the former rural communities had entirely lapsed. Farming had become a part-time summer job for farmers, who previously would have regarded farming as their principal occupation and wintertime jobs as a distraction.

The availability of unlimited water on farmsteads became an issue when the Government of Saskatchewan at length permitted the subdivision of farmsteads: when this became viable, numerous luxurious farmsteads became attractive venues for townspeople to set up summer homes on former Qu'Appelle district farmsteads with the former farms consolidated as large-scale commercial operations having no relationship whatever with their former farmsteads.

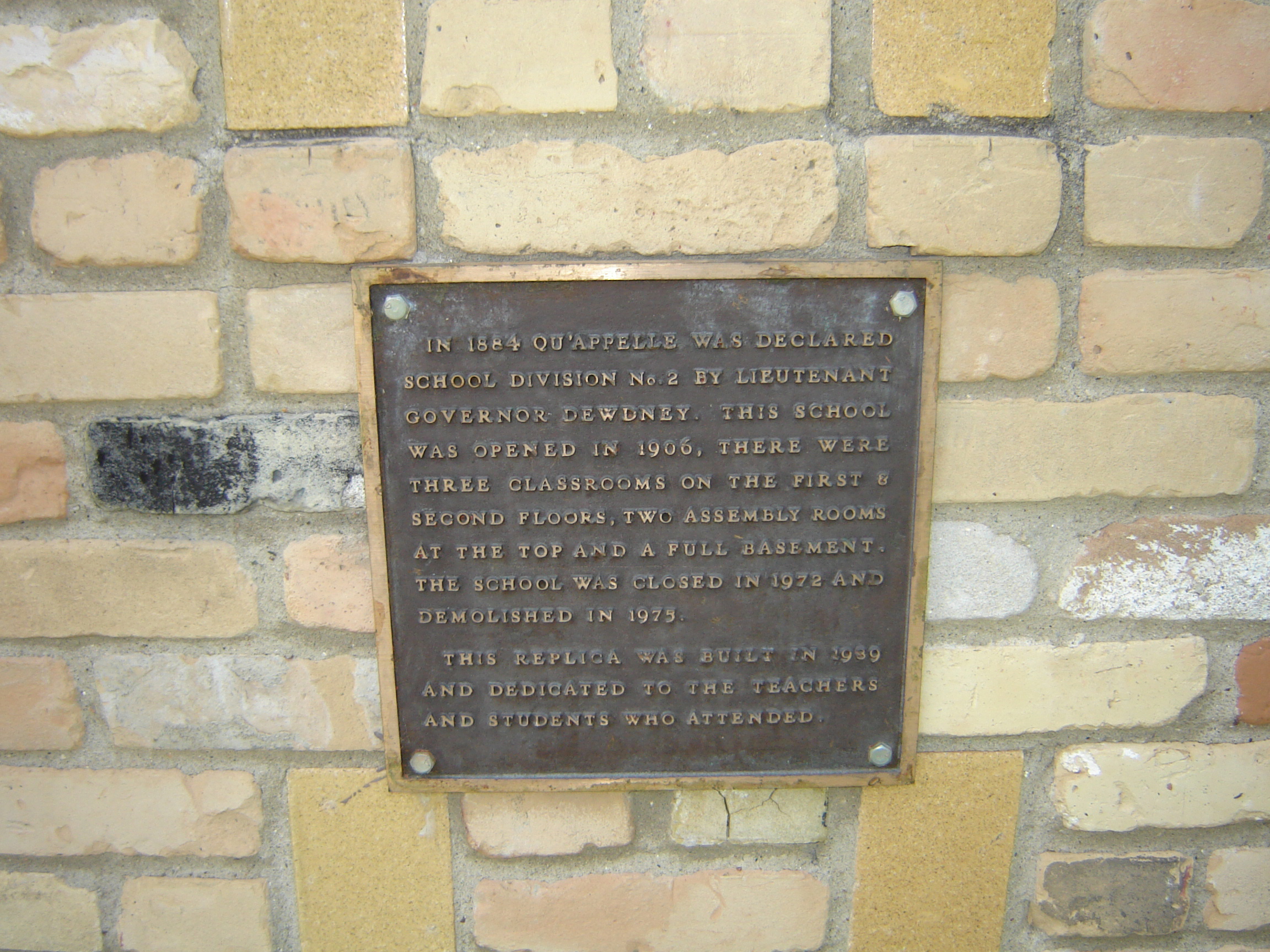
Qu'Appelle monument to former school

However, the rural population which Qu'Appelle had served steadily declined as family farms were consolidated: The Dominion Lands Act, 1872 had provided for farms of 65 ha (160 acres) or ¼ section, a section being 2.6 km^{2} (1 sq mi). The Depression of the 1930s made it clear that while this might have been enough land for a family farm in Eastern Canada, it was not nearly enough in the dryland farming conditions of the prairies, and farmers steadily sold up or bought up, farm sizes increased and the hinterland population waned.

Rural churches, largely Presbyterian and then as of 1925 United Church, served by ministers based in Qu'Appelle, Indian Head and Fort Qu'Appelle, and rural one-room schools closed by the late 1950s and early 1960s respectively: all rural churches were gone by 1960 and the remaining rural schools were closed in June 1963; farm children were thereafter bused to town school. Little trace of either now remains as rural schools' and churches' property was resumed by local farmers.

== Geography ==
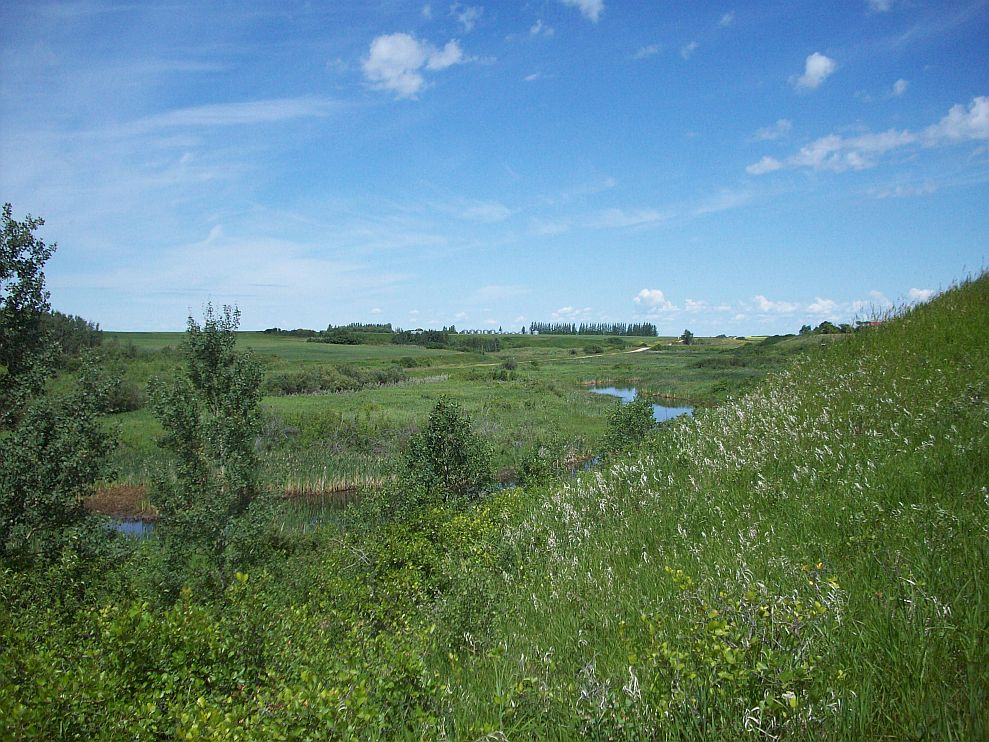
Echo Creek, rising immediately north of the town of Qu'Appelle and flowing into the Qu'Appelle Valley at Fort Qu'Appelle

Qu'Appelle is located in the Indian Head Plain of the Aspen Parkland ecoregion on the parkland of the Qu'Appelle flood plain. Qu'Appelle's elevation is 662.90 m (2,174.9 ft) above sea level. The area is characterised by lush rolling grasslands, interspersed with poplar bluffs (in prairie Canadian terminology poplar groves surrounding sloughs) and open sloughs. Qu'Appelle is located in the transition zone between the Qu'Appelle River and the corresponding Qu'Appelle Valley and the Canadian Prairies.

To the visitor, southern Saskatchewan Qu'Appelle Valley might, at first glance, appear to be a mirage. Bordered by seemingly-endless farmland flatness, the dramatic physical features of the valley appear somewhat out of place.

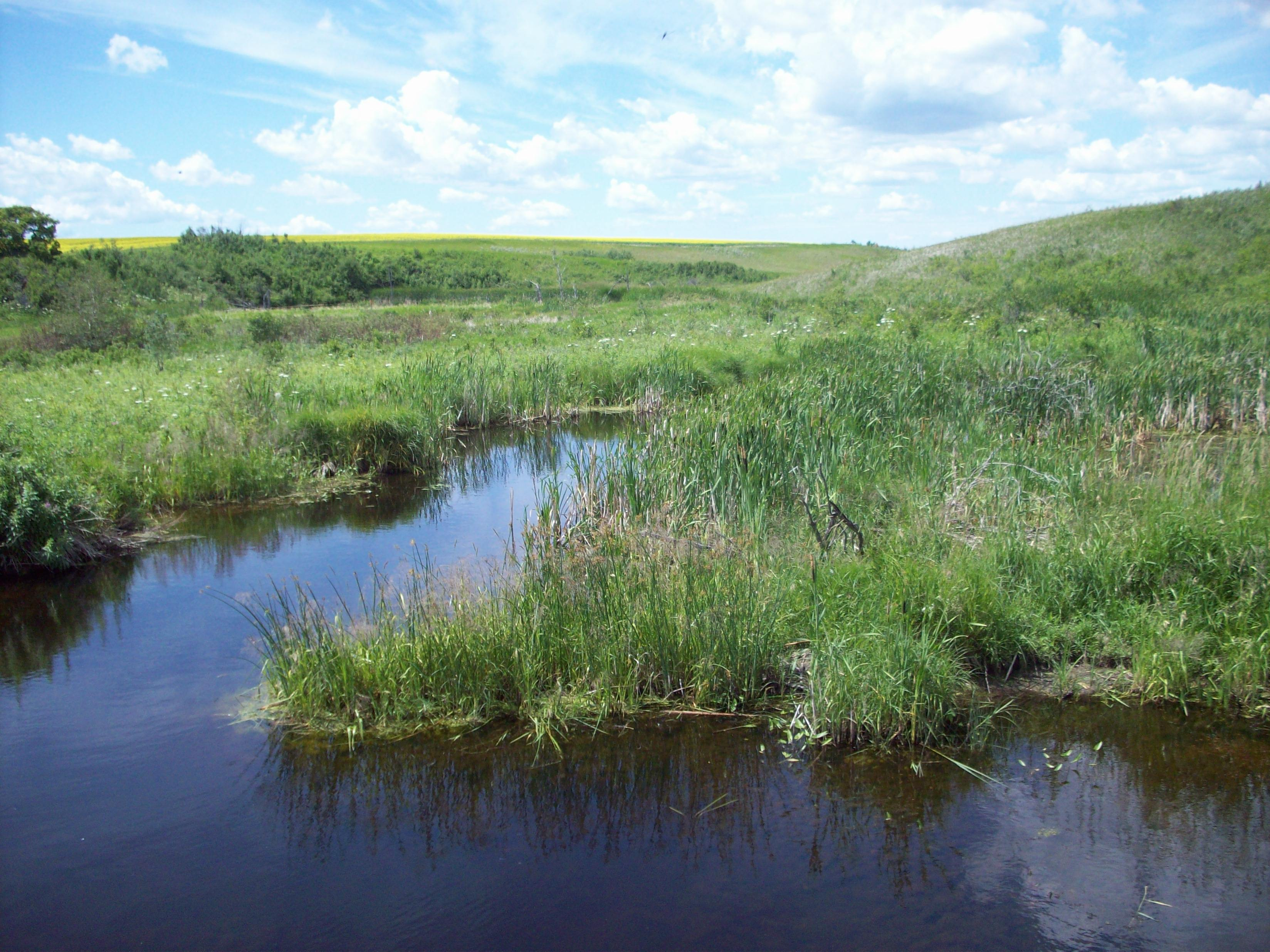
Echo Creek shortly north of its source close to town of Qu'Appelle, but characteristic of topography of Qu'Appelle district

Echo Creek (occasionally known as Springbrook Creek) rises immediately to the north of Qu'Appelle and opens out into a broad coulee immediately to the south of the Qu'Appelle Valley.

Natural features of Egg Lake (20.6 km (13 mi)); Echo Creek (14.8 km (9 mi)); the Fishing Lakes (25.1 km (16 mi)) and Strawberry Lakes (27.7 km (17 mi)) are near Qu'Appelle. The Fishing Lakes—Katepwa, Mission, Echo and Pasqua Lakes—immediately to the north of the Qu'Appelle in the Qu'Appelle Valley, are all fed by the Qu'Appelle River.

"[I]in the years prior to World War I ...[T]he recreational potential of the district began to be exploited and numerous cottages began to appear on the area lakes." The lakes afford swimming, boating and other water related activities in summer and cross-country skiing, snowmobiling and ice fishing in winter. There is also Echo Valley Provincial Park located between Echo Lake and Pasqua Lake. The park provides an RV park, camping, swimming, boating and fishing.

The Indian Head Bird Sanctuary, maintained by the Canada Agriculture Experimental Farm Tree Nursery is located 14 km (8.7 mi) east of Qu'Appelle. The sanctuary is a mixed-grass prairie eco-region and wetlands created by the damming of the Indian Head Creek.

== Climate ==
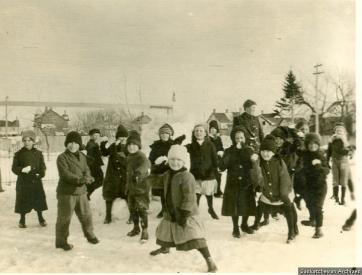
Children in winter at Qu'Appelle School, circa 1915

Qu'Appelle has a humid continental climate with frigid, dry winters and warm summers. Qu'Appelle's winters can be uncomfortably cold; but warm, dry Chinook winds routinely blow into the area from the Pacific Ocean during the winter months, providing the occasional break from the cold especially during the times of El Niño-Southern Oscillation. These winds have been known to raise the winter temperature by up to 15 °C (27 °F) in just a few hours.

Qu'Appelle is a town of extremes, and temperatures have ranged anywhere from a record low of −48.3 °C (−54.9 °F) on 1 February 1893 to a record high of 41.7 °C (107.1 °F) on 5 July 1937. According to Environment Canada, the average temperature in Qu'Appelle ranges from a January daily average of −14.2 °C (6.4 °F) to a July daily average of 18.5 °C (65.3 °F). As a consequence of Qu'Appelle's relative dryness, summer evenings can be very cool, the average summer minimum temperature drops to 10.6 °C (51.1 °F).

Qu'Appelle receives an average of 455.4 mm (17.93 in) of precipitation annually, with 342.5 mm (13.48 in) of that occurring in the form of rain, and 113.0 cm (44.5 in) falling as snow. Most of the precipitation occurs from May to August, with June and July averaging the most monthly rainfall. On 13 July 1981, Qu'Appelle received 113.1 mm (4.45 in) of precipitation, making it the wettest day in the town's recorded history. On 12 May 1983, Qu'Appelle received 45 cm (18 in) of snowfall, providing the snowiest day in the town's recorded history. Droughts are not uncommon and may occur at any time of the year, lasting sometimes for months or even several years.

Climate data for Qu'Appelle, 1981–2010 normals, extremes 1877–present
Month	Jan	Feb	Mar	Apr	May	Jun	Jul	Aug	Sep	Oct	Nov	Dec	Year
Record high °C (°F)	12.8 (55.0)	13.9 (57.0)	24.4 (75.9)	31.5 (88.7)	37.0 (98.6)	38.5 (101.3)	41.7 (107.1)	38.3 (100.9)	35.0 (95.0)	31.5 (88.7)	22.8 (73.0)	17.8 (64.0)	41.7 (107.1)
Mean daily maximum °C (°F)	−9.4 (15.1)	−6.7 (19.9)	-0.0 (32.0)	11.0 (51.8)	17.7 (63.9)	21.7 (71.1)	25.0 (77.0)	24.5 (76.1)	18.2 (64.8)	10.1 (50.2)	−0.8 (30.6)	−7.5 (18.5)	8.7 (47.7)
Daily mean °C (°F)	−14.2 (6.4)	−11.4 (11.5)	−4.9 (23.2)	4.6 (40.3)	11.0 (51.8)	15.6 (60.1)	18.5 (65.3)	17.7 (63.9)	11.8 (53.2)	4.5 (40.1)	−5.1 (22.8)	−12.0 (10.4)	3.0 (37.4)
Mean daily minimum °C (°F)	−18.9 (−2.0)	−16.1 (3.0)	−9.8 (14.4)	−1.9 (28.6)	4.3 (39.7)	9.5 (49.1)	12.0 (53.6)	10.9 (51.6)	5.3 (41.5)	−1.2 (29.8)	−9.4 (15.1)	−16.4 (2.5)	−2.7 (27.1)
Record low °C (°F)	−45.6 (−50.1)	−48.3 (−54.9)	−42.8 (−45.0)	−31.1 (−24.0)	−13.3 (8.1)	−3.9 (25.0)	−1.1 (30.0)	−3.9 (25.0)	−12.2 (10.0)	−25.6 (−14.1)	−34.4 (−29.9)	−42.0 (−43.6)	−48.3 (−54.9)
Average precipitation mm (inches)	15.6 (0.61)	11.5 (0.45)	23.1 (0.91)	26.9 (1.06)	60.6 (2.39)	83.2 (3.28)	74.7 (2.94)	57.8 (2.28)	38.2 (1.50)	26.4 (1.04)	18.0 (0.71)	19.5 (0.77)	455.4 (17.93)
Average rainfall mm (inches)	0.5 (0.02)	0.5 (0.02)	3.8 (0.15)	14.8 (0.58)	52.0 (2.05)	82.9 (3.26)	74.7 (2.94)	57.8 (2.28)	35.5 (1.40)	17.5 (0.69)	1.8 (0.07)	0.6 (0.02)	342.5 (13.48)
Average snowfall cm (inches)	15.1 (5.9)	11.0 (4.3)	19.4 (7.6)	12.1 (4.8)	8.6 (3.4)	0.2 (0.1)	0.0 (0.0)	0.0 (0.0)	2.7 (1.1)	8.9 (3.5)	16.2 (6.4)	18.9 (7.4)	113.0 (44.5)
Source: Environment Canada

== Demographics ==
Historical Population
Year	Pop.	±%
1901	434	—
1906	778	+79.3%
1910	851	+9.4%
1916	722	−15.2%
1996	632	−12.5%
2001	648	+2.5%
2006	624	−3.7%

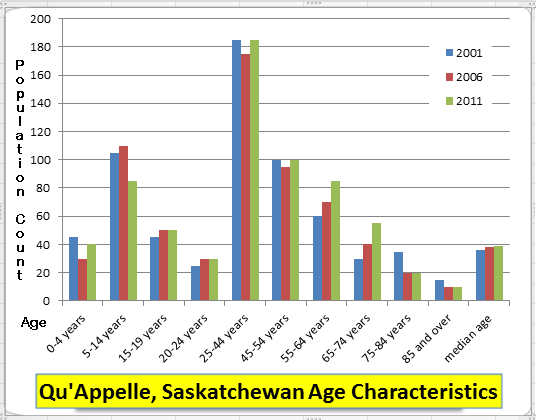
2001, 2006, 2011 Population Age Characteristics

In the 2021 Census of Population conducted by Statistics Canada, Qu'Appelle had a population of 625 living in 285 of its 317 total private dwellings, a change of −2.2% from its 2016 population of 639. With a land area of 3.88 km^{2} (1.50 sq mi), it had a population density of 161.1/km^{2} (417.2/sq mi) in 2021.

The 2006, 48.8 per cent of Qu'Appelle's population were male and 51.2 per cent were female. Children under five accounted for approximately 4.8 per cent of the resident population of Qu'Appelle.

According to data from 2001, more than 36.9% of the town's residents identify themselves as Roman Catholic; 38.46% of residents are Protestant, 2.3% are undifferentiated Christian, 5.38% are Buddhist, and 16.9% of residents do not practise a religion.

Canada census – Qu'Appelle community profile

	2021	2011
Population	625 (-2.2% from 2016)	668 (+7.1% from 2006)
Land area	3.88 km^{2} (1.50 sq mi)	4.22 km^{2} (1.63 sq mi)
Population density	160.9/km^{2} (417/sq mi)	158.1/km^{2} (409/sq mi)
Median age	41.6 (M: 40.4, F: 44)	39.2 (M: 38.2, F: 40.4)
Private dwellings	285 (total)	286 (total)
Median household income		$N/A

References: 2021 2011

== Media ==
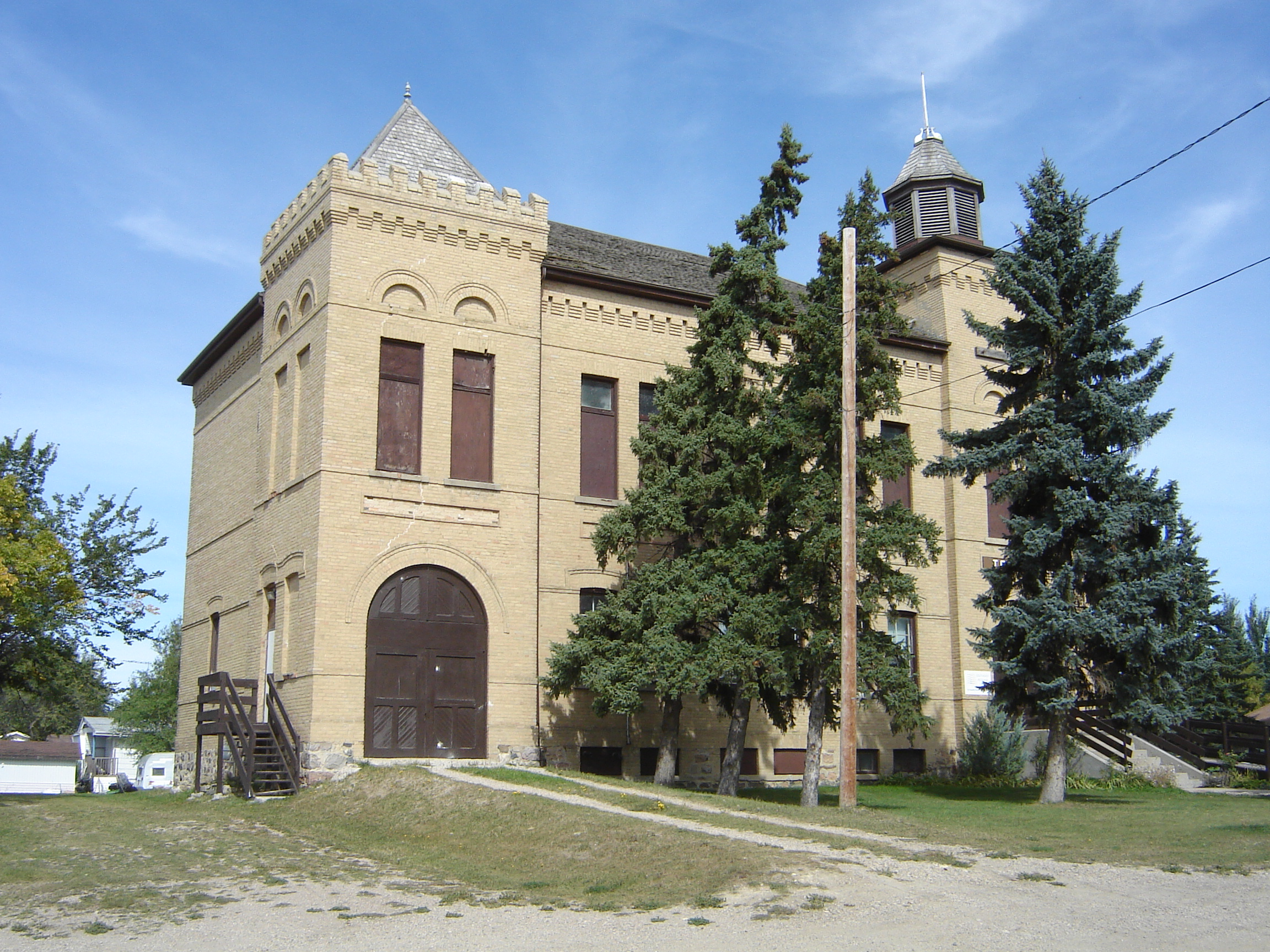
Qu'Appelle Town Hall with the now disused Opera House, 2008. Note boarded up windows and doors.

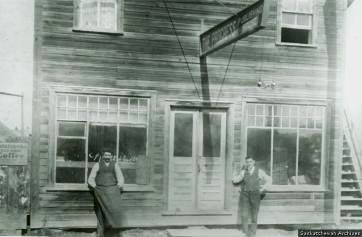
Qu'Appelle Progress newspaper office, 1900.

The Qu'Appelle Progress, the town newspaper, began production at the very outset of Qu'Appelle's establishment and maintained publication till the mid-1960s. It originally provided substantive news as to national and international events when access to wider news organs was not locally available.

Latterly it devolved to a local community paper, largely subsisting on reports from farm wives as to the waning hinterland rural communities. Community reporters phoned in accounts of events in such now historic rural communities as Inglewood, Strathcarroll and Springbrook.

Rural community life increasingly lapsed through the 1960s and reports from farm wives to the Qu'Appelle Progress of community events became redundant as such rural communities waned, lost cohesion (country United Churches closing in the 1950s; country schools the end of June 1963) and ultimately vanished.

By that time such rural communities had passed into their brief, three-generation history, Heber Ellis, the editor and publisher of The Progress had reached the end of his life and The Progress died soon after him.

Nowadays the Qu'Appelle Spirit Monthly newsletter provides local reporting from volunteers.

== Governance ==
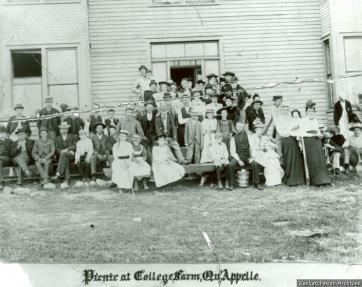
Picnic at the Anglican St John's College Farm, Qu'Appelle, Assiniboia, circa 1894.

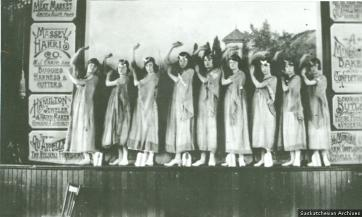
Qu'Appelle High School students performing in the Opera House, 1920

The town of Qu'Appelle was incorporated February 20, 1903 when, ironically, its halcyon days when anticipation that it would be of significant importance ecclesiastically and possibly in government and commerce were already long behind it.

Municipal affairs are handled by the town mayor and council. The Rural Municipality of South Qu'Appelle No. 157 office is located in Qu'Appelle and provides municipal rural affairs to the small localities of Avonhurst, Edgeley, Grassmere, Green Haven, Qu'Appelle Airport and St. Josephs Colony. South Qu'Appelle RM in 1885 was a large area comprising more than 18 townships with an area of 1,530 km^{2} (592 sq mi). Due its size, the council divided into 27 road districts and appointed road overseers to maintain construction and maintenance of early roads.

Qu'Appelle is in the federal electoral district of Regina—Qu'Appelle (formerly Qu'Appelle).

Provincially, the area is within the constituency of Indian Head-Milestone.

== Education ==
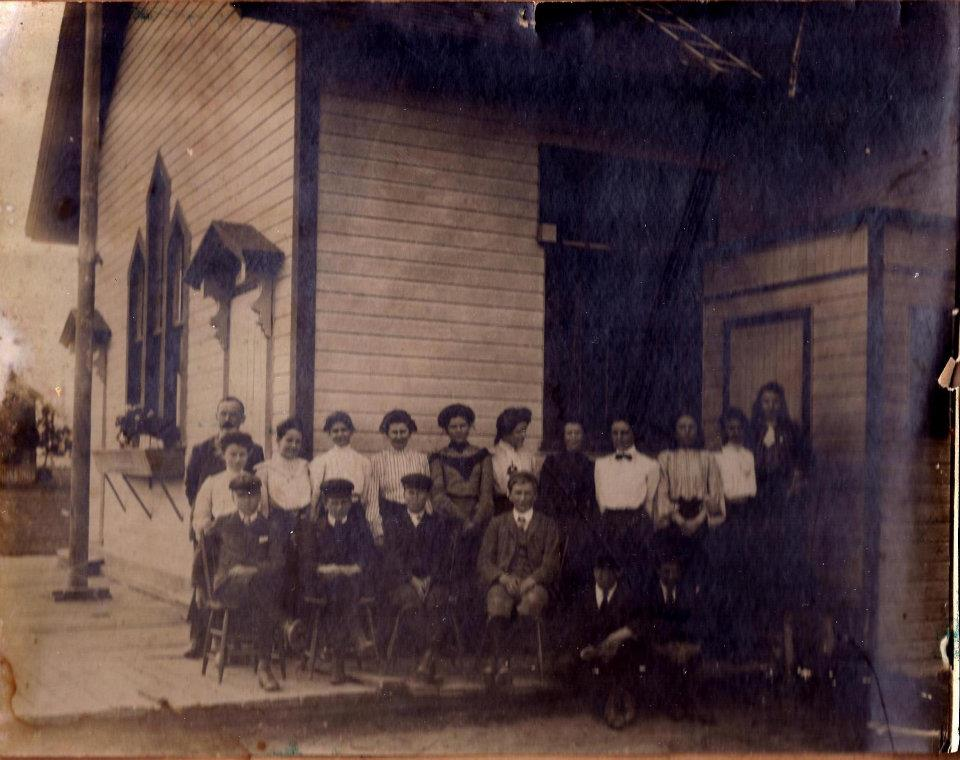
Qu'Appelle High School graduating class circa 1902 posed outside long-gone Methodist Church

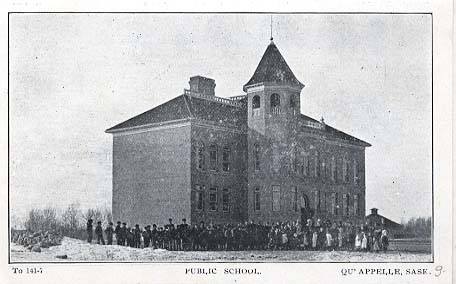
Qu'Appelle High School shortly after World War I with students posed out front

Bishop Adelbert Anson, the first Bishop of Qu'Appelle (1884–1892), established the St John's College Farm, a boys' school, agricultural and theological college shortly after his arrival in the diocese in 1884. When it became clear that funding from eastern Canada, the heartland of Canadian Anglicanism, would not be forthcoming, English funding for the Anglican mission on the Canadian prairies soon dried up and St. John's College dissolved shortly after Bishop Anson's departure in 1893.

December 5, 1884 saw the creation of the first two school districts in the North-West Territories; Moose Jaw School District #1 and Qu'Appelle School District #2. The wood frame two- or three-classroom school house gave way to a 2½- storey brick school with full basement in 1906.

Despite the town's decline, Qu'Appelle School had a new, though temporary, lease on life in 1963 when the new consolidated school unit came in, rural schools closed and farm children began to be driven to school in Qu'Appelle daily.

However, education planners did not anticipate how quickly both the town's own and its far region's population and its town-commercial outlets would continue to decline. The farm seeking and supplying area surrounding town would continue to be steadily evacuated of people as the 1950s through 1970s drew on: Qu'Appelle School, long together with the town hall a centre of community activity, was closed in 1973 and demolished in 1975.

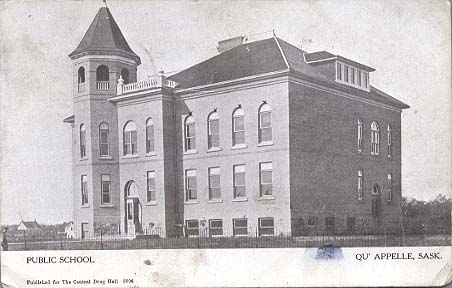
Qu'Appelle School, built 1906, closed 1973, demolished 1975.

November 27, 1964 saw the opening of the nine-classroom brick James Hamblin School. Elementary school education from kindergarten to grade 9 is provided there; it is administered by the Qu'Appelle Valley School Division No. 139.

The primary school of 1964 was under the longstanding 1906 high school in academic progress for less than a decade. Secondary school has not been available in Qu'Appelle since 2000. High school students from Qu'Appelle must travel to Indian Head High School, part of the Prairie Valley School Division No 208.

== Churches ==
=== St. Peter's Church of England Pro-Cathedral ===
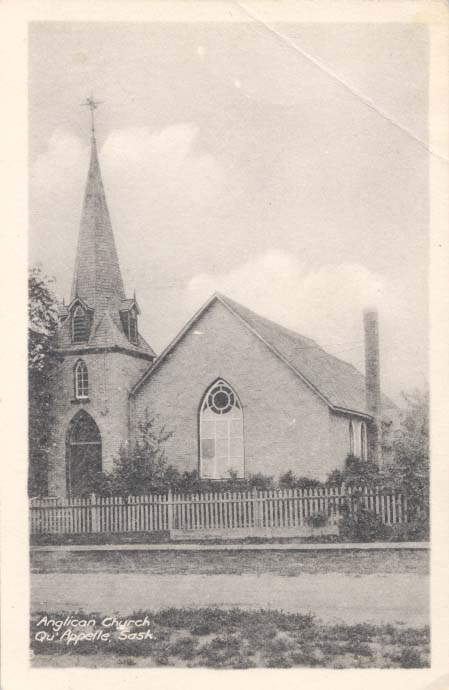
St. Peter's Pro-Cathedral first decade of the 20th century

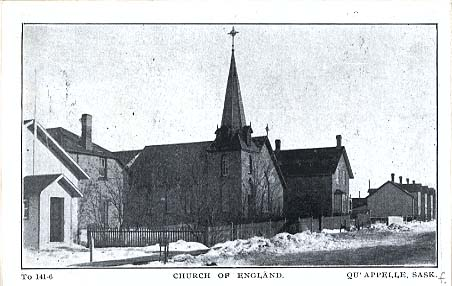
St Peter's Pro-Cathedral, Qu'Appelle with the Terrace, circa 1920s

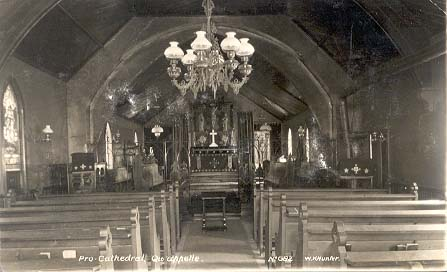
St. Peter's Pro-Cathedral, Qu'Appelle, interior, circa 1900

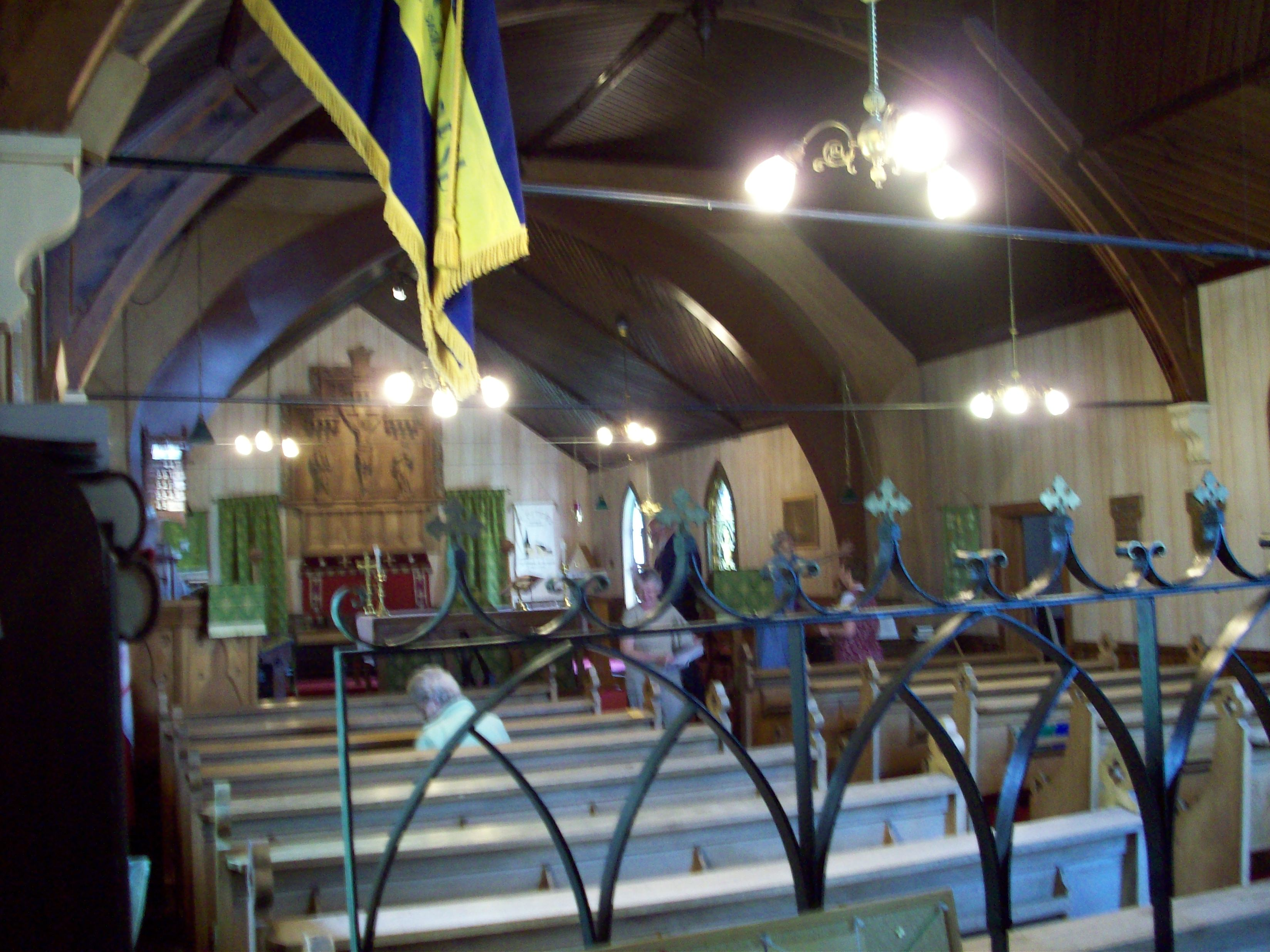
St. Peter's, Qu'Appelle, interior, 2008

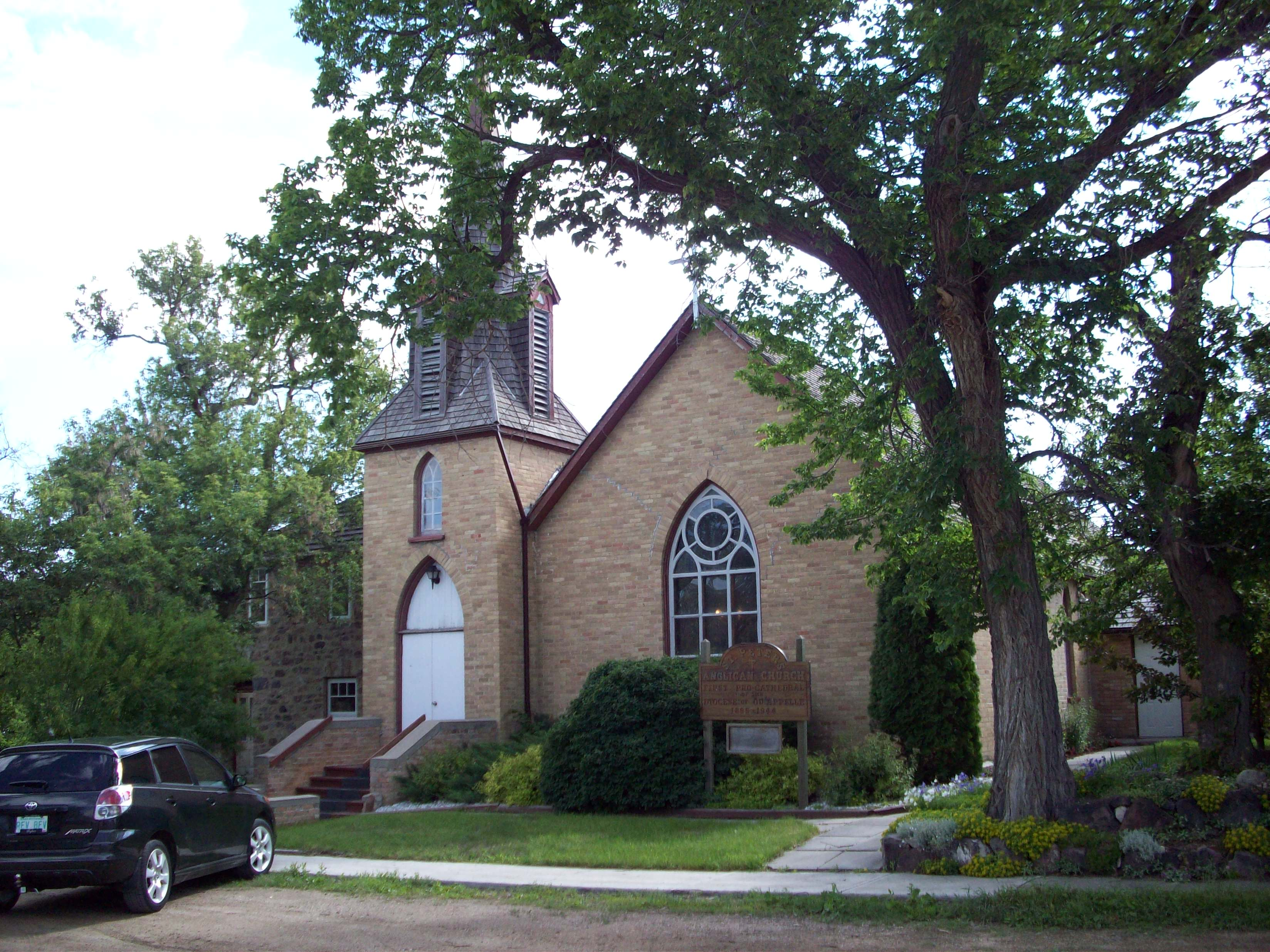
St Peter's (former) Pro-Cathedral, Qu'Appelle, 2008

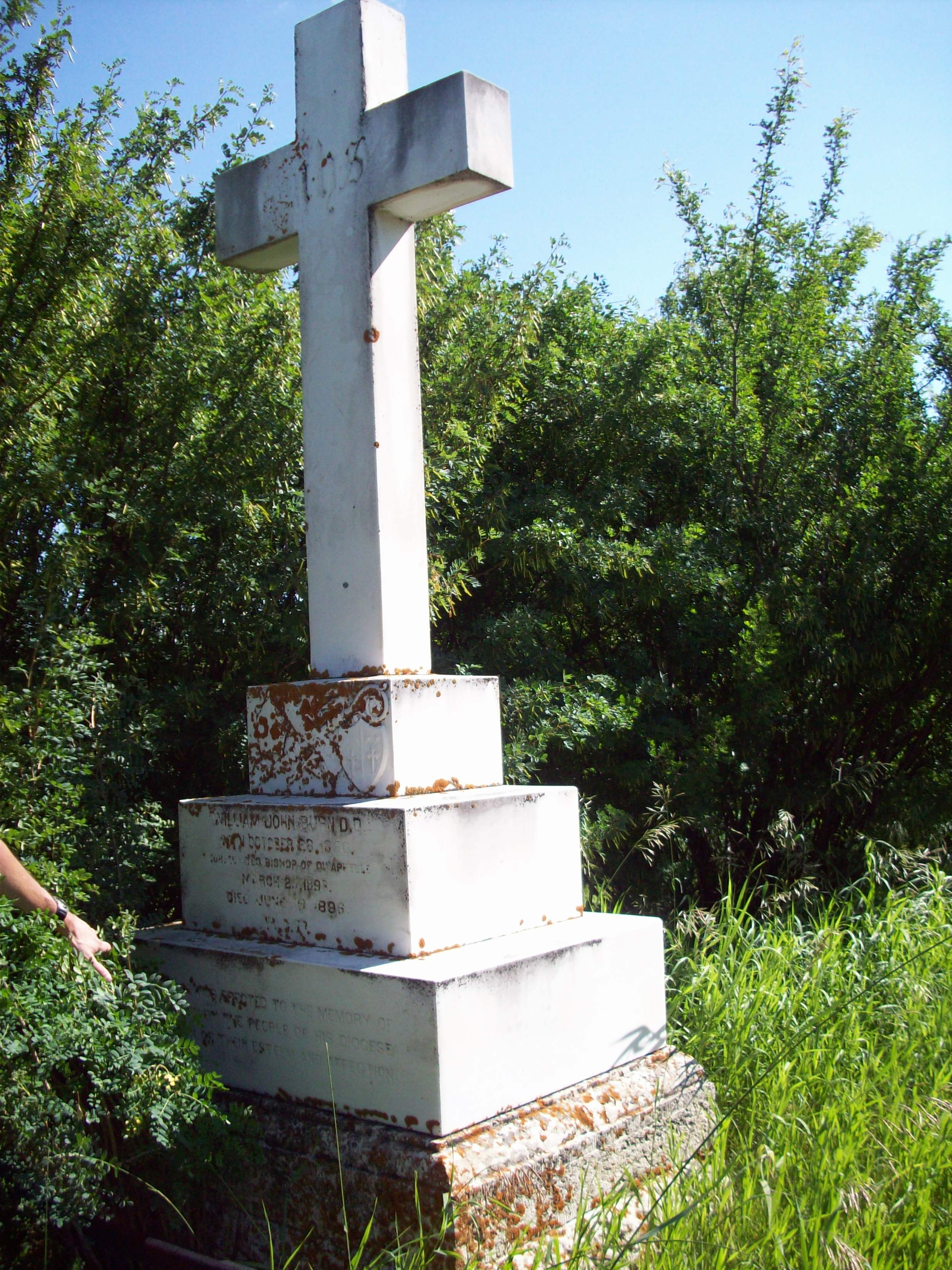
Grave of Bishop John Burn, who died in 1896

In anticipation of its presumed eventual urban importance the Anglican ecclesiastical province of Ruperts Land designated the village of Qu'Appelle as the cathedral city of the new diocese of Qu'Appelle of the Church of England (since 1955 the Anglican Church of Canada). The diocese of Qu'Appelle still retains that name, though the historic association with the town of Qu'Appelle other than as a subsidiary congregation of the parish of Indian Head is long past. St Peter's, the pro-cathedral, was built in 1885. Its stone rectory next door, built in 1894, is now in private hands, the church (as with the other three denominations) having long since withdrawn any full-time residential clergy from the town.

Bishop Adelbert Anson, the first Bishop of Qu'Appelle (1884), cultivated a relationship between Qu'Appelle and his home Diocese of Lichfield in England and with wealthy friends there. They briefly took on both Diocese of Qu'Appelle as a mission field and the parish of St Peter's Pro-Cathedral as a particular focus of interest. Much of the early development of the St John's College Farm and the furnishing of St Peter's Pro-Cathedral are attributable to that early connection. The diocese briefly operated a training facility for Anglican clergy in the town and the St John's College Farm, a model farm immediately to the west of town. Bishop Burn, who lacked Bishop Anson's connections with patrons in the Diocese of Lichfield, closed both of these facilities in 1895. The parish church of St Peter's, however, continued as the pro-cathedral for southern Saskatchewan until 1944. The original Bishop's Court, the official residence of the diocesan bishop, was also in Qu'Appelle. It was moved by John Burn, the second bishop of Qu'Appelle, to Indian Head, some 13 km (8 mi) to the east of Qu'Appelle, in 1896 when he closed the college. It had become apparent that

1. diocesan debt was becoming disproportionate to anticipated resources in the largely non-Anglican District of Assiniboia and
2. the sponsoring Diocese of Lichfield in England was unwilling to underwrite the expenses of such programs indefinitely.

Early on, the bishop's residence was further relocated from Indian Head to the new diocesan property in Regina. Still, when Bishop Burn died he was buried in Qu'Appelle Cemetery, where his grave monument remains the largest. Ultimately, with the ecclesiastical hierarchy and the provincial metropolis long since having been removed to Regina, pro-cathedral status was removed from St Peter's, Qu'Appelle and conferred on St Paul's, Regina in 1944. (However, even Regina's continuing status as an episcopal see city and that of St Paul's, Regina as a cathedral may now be in doubt as the further declining Anglican Church rationalises its increasingly top-heavy episcopal structure.)

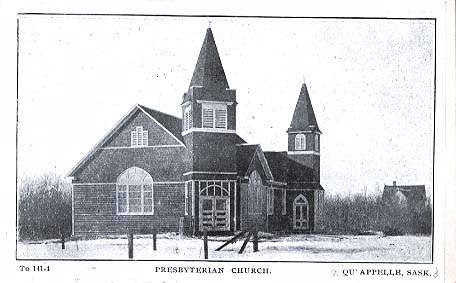
Knox Presbyterian, later United, Church, Qu'Appelle, circa 1910.

=== Qu'Appelle Methodist, Knox Presbyterian and from 1925 United; St Andrew's Presbyterian ===
The Church of England parish of St. Peter's having been substantially constituted by English immigrants, the native Canadian Protestant arrivals at Qu'Appelle established two churches:

1. The Qu'Appelle Methodist Church, which opened in 1883 as part of a circuit that included Edgeley, Saskatchewan Methodist Church. and
2. The Knox Presbyterian Church, built in 1884.

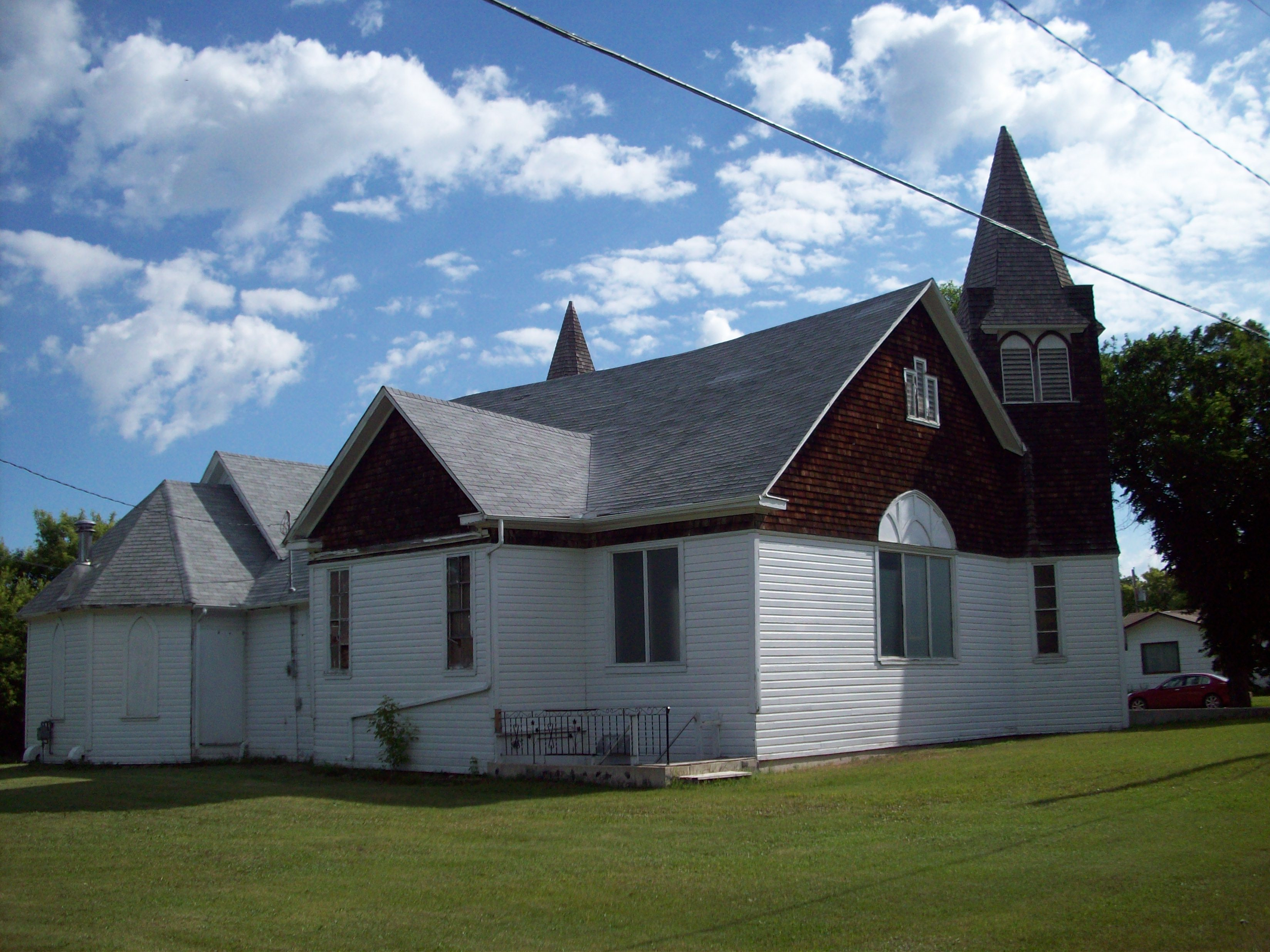
Knox Presbyterian-cum-United Church, 2008.

The Presbyterian and Methodist congregations merged in 1925 to become a congregation of the United Church of Canada. They maintained the Presbyterian church building as its facility and with the minister of Qu'Appelle Methodist Church continuing at the present day Knox United.

The Presbyterians of Qu'Appelle were so substantial a body that when a non-concurring minority of their congregation seceded and re-constituted themselves a separate continuing Presbyterian congregation, building a new meeting house on Main Street for their St Andrew's Presbyterian Church, both congregations remained viable:

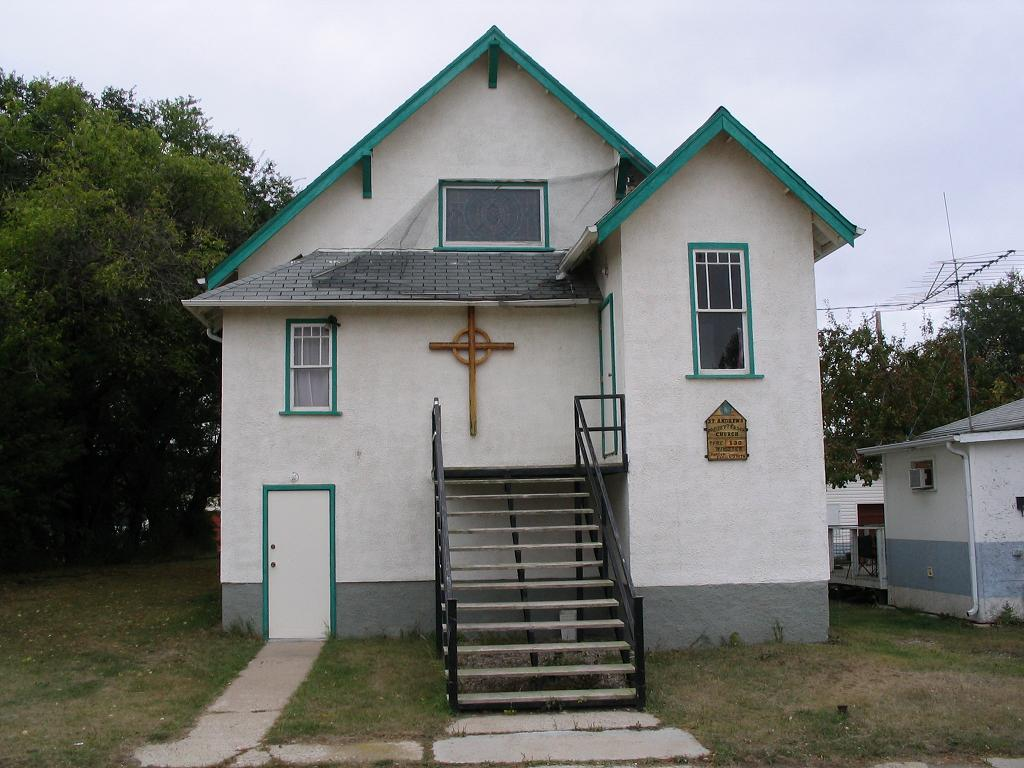
St. Andrew's continuing Presbyterian, Main Street, Qu'Appelle, after 1925.

Those who went into the union still constituted a majority of the United Church congregation and both were able to maintain a vital presence in the town for many years, with St. Andrew's continuing Presbyterian congregation sharing a minister with Indian Head. From the beginning of the church union in 1925 it was clear that the continuing Presbyterians could no longer support their own local clergyman and Indian Head supplied the Qu'Appelle Presbyterians with a commuting minister who travelled to Qu'Appelle each Sunday.

For a generation the church union issue raised hackles in Qu'Appelle among uniting and non-concurring Presbyterians and many firm friendships were sundered. Nowadays as elsewhere in Canada, as the matter has passed into history and matters of denominational affiliation have largely become moot in Canada's increasingly secular society, the issue is largely forgotten. In 2013 "[congregation] of Qu'Appelle ...[moved towards] congregational closure and sale of the church [building]."

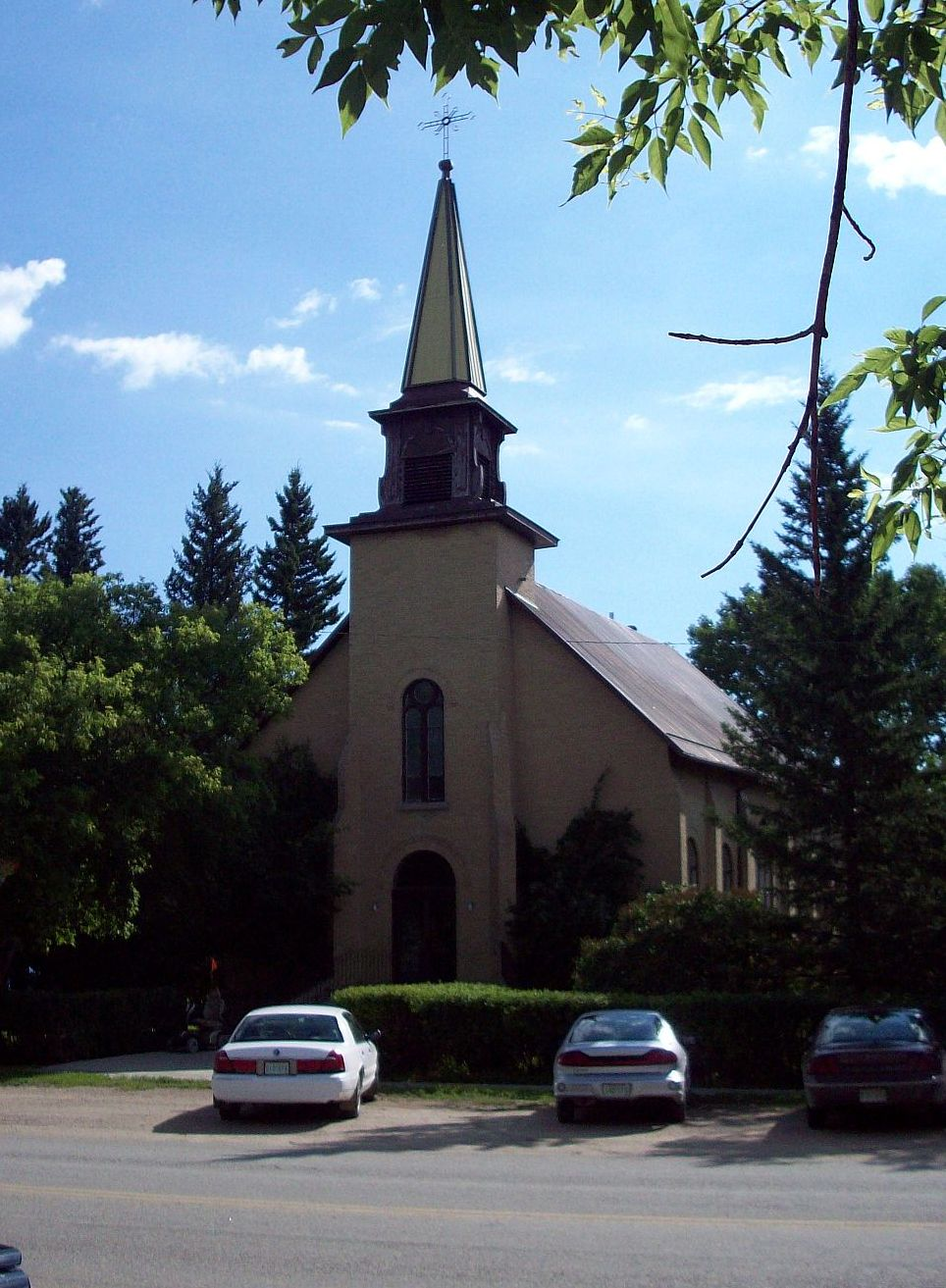
Roman Catholic Church of the Immaculate Conception, 2008

=== Roman Catholic Church of the Immaculate Conception ===
The Roman Catholics built the fine Immaculate Conception Church on Main Street in 1906 (consecrated in 1907). The building is in the same yellow brick as the town hall and former school, the pro-cathedral and numerous houses and Main Street businesses, which once characterised the town's not-unimpressive yellow brick style.

Immaculate Conception parish began in 1886. Its original church building survives as a private residential dwelling. Whereas Presbyterian and Methodist, and later United, churches maintained rural congregations in which farm families locally worshipped and conducted community events, Roman Catholics as with Anglicans came to town for Sunday services and liturgical festivals and from the outset the Catholic Church in Qu'Appelle had a substantial urban presence.

The Roman Catholic constituency in Qu'Appelle was originally French, German and Métis. As Canadian denominational affiliation has become increasingly amorphous, the Church of the Immaculate Conception's Catholicism has largely ceased to have ethnic significance.

The Parish of the Immaculate Conception has the largest church building in the town, seating up to 225. It has the most vital single surviving congregation in the town, albeit as with the Anglican, United Church and continuing Presbyterian congregations, long since without a resident clergyman.

The Qu’Appelle Deanery is one of 9 deaneries within the Archdiocese of Regina. [The]...deanery is comprised of 19 rural parishes" including "Indian Head - St. Joseph[,] Wolseley - Ste. Anne[,] Grenfell - St. Columbkille[,] Qu'Appelle - Immaculate Conception[.]

== Cultural events and entertainment ==
In Qu'Appelle's early days, churches as well as the school constituted a major focus of community social as well as religious life through the year. Social events involving the whole community occurred when the town organised

Maypole Dance, Qu'Appelle, 1 May 1919

- St George's Day celebrations on April 23,
- May Day celebrations on May 1,
- Victoria Day fireworks on May 24,
- a parade for Dominion Day on July 1,
- a summer agricultural fair in July,

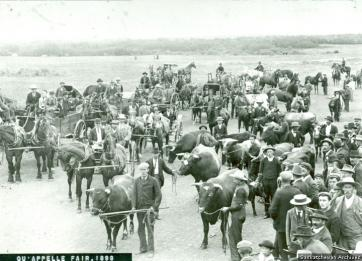
Cattle display at Qu'Appelle Summer Fair, 1898

- school plays and concerts at Christmas and in the spring,
- amateur community concerts and theatricals in the "opera house" in the Town Hall;
- cricket matches and later, as the English constituency waned,
- community baseball games
- hockey games in the indoor community rink.

The town's churches mounted parish, congregational, Sunday School and other events through the year which were a focus of social activity for members of the four religious denominations of the town: the Church of England, Roman Catholics, Presbyterians, Methodists (later United Church, containing all the Methodists and the majority of the Presbyterians) and, after the 1925 church union, the continuing Presbyterian congregation.

There was also the previously mentioned cinema on Main Street; during the early years of the building's existence a horseshoe pitch was set up and used alongside. A curling club and curling rink were established in the late 1880s.

== Sports and other recreation ==
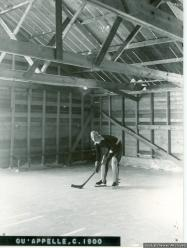
Qu'Appelle Hockey rink, 1903

Dealing again with Qu'Appelle's lively historical past, horse racing and harness racing were the earliest recreational activities in the area, with several avid horsemen competing in annual events. Cricket matches and hockey games were early community activities; lantern slides and movie shows were enjoyed in the late 19th century and onward when church halls and, later, when in the 1900s through the 1950s the town cinema on Main Street provided movies.

Moving to today's diminished liveliness within the town, the Recreation and Culture Committee oversees the activities at the skating rink, Centennial and Capital Day Parks, Community Hall, tennis court and library.

== Infrastructure ==
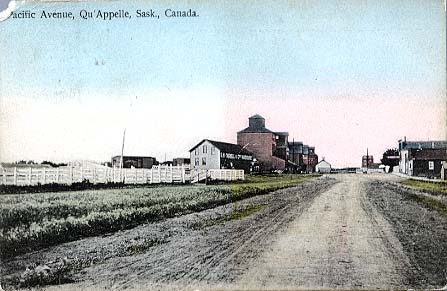
Pacific Avenue "highway" from Indian Head to the east to McLean, Balgonie and Regina to the west, passing through Qu'Appelle at the south end of Main Street circa 1910. This was the predecessor of Trans-Canada Highway, whose relocation a quarter of a mile (400 m) south further hastened the end of Qu'Appelle's commercial viabity.

=== Transport ===
When the rail arrived in 1882, the Troy (Qu'Appelle)-Prince Albert trail served freight and stagecoach transport to the north-west and onwards to Edmonton. The CPR formerly provided passenger service east and west from Qu'Appelle and generally throughout the province.

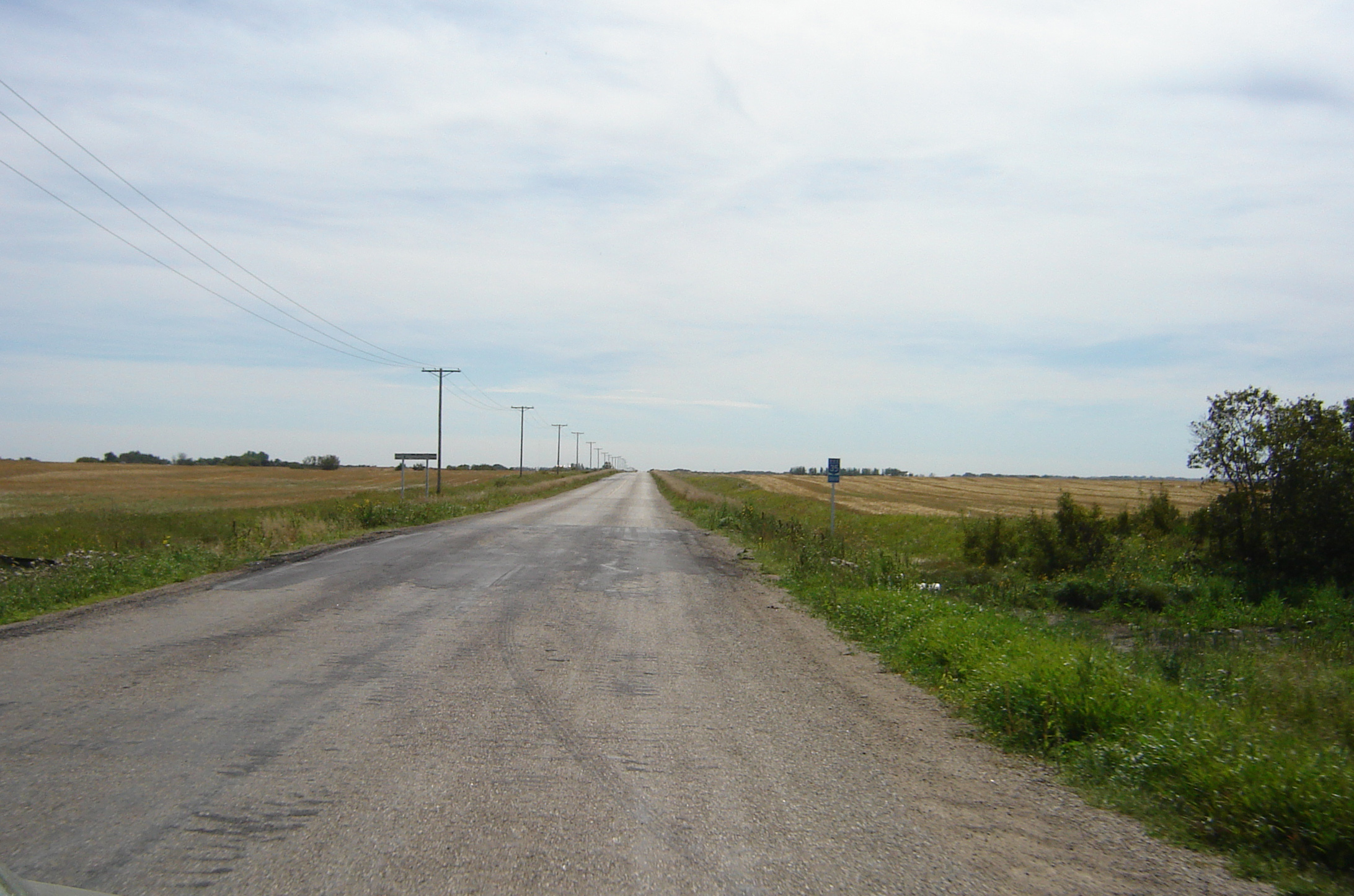
Highway 35 in 2008, four decades after Highway 10 from Balgonie northeast to and beyond Fort Qu'Appelle eliminated the vast proportion of no. 35's significance on the Regina to Qu'Appelle Valley route.

Early bishops of the Church of England Diocese of Qu'Appelle were able to travel by train from their original see "city" of Qu'Appelle to parishes throughout what was then the District of Assiniboia in the North-West Territories, in 1905 becoming southern Saskatchewan. CPR passenger services were heavily used before the arrival of widespread private motor vehicle ownership and again during the Depression from 1929 through World War II; the CPR continues to run past Qu'Appelle but no longer maintains a station or indeed routine passenger facilities; nor are there any longer grain elevators.

The Trans-Canada Highway was built some one kilometre to the south of both the CPR tracks and the old east–west highway, bypassing Qu'Appelle and significantly reducing traffic through the town. Highway 35 runs south to Weyburn unpaved and north to Fort Qu'Appelle; while no longer heavily trafficked since the opening of Highway 10 from Balgonie to the Valley, it is still paved on the northward sector, although with the drastically depleted traffic demand with reduced population both in town and on farms, largely eliminated Regina-to-Qu'Appelle Valley traffic and loss of grain elevators, gasoline and vehicle repair stations (into the 1960s there was still one gasoline station in town and one on each side of number 1 highway), retail stores, post office, bank, hospital, high school and movie theatre it is inevitably falling into reduced maintenance of pavement.

=== Utilities ===
Qu'Appelle was home to a North-West Mounted Police barracks established by Major Walsh in 1882 and until the 1950s there was a resident RCMP town constable. Early water was supplied by digging wells 3.0 to 6.1 m (10 to 20 ft) deep, until the 1930s when a 91 m (300 ft) well was dug. 1962 saw the construction of a 2,300 L (500 imp gal) water tower as well as the first town fire hydrant. The town foreman co-ordinates and manages the Public Works & Utilities Department. Qu'Appelle and the surrounding rural municipality of South Qu'Appelle No. 157 are served by the Qu'Appelle Volunteer Fire Department, who are trained in health care and fire rescue practices. Today the Indian Head RCMP detachment provides police protection for the community.

=== Healthcare ===
Nowadays of course the population is far too thin to demand the medical services that were readily provided in past years. The town had a medical doctor living in the town from the early 1880s until the mid-1960s and for many years virtually all town and hinterland births occurred in Qu'Appelle Memorial Hospital, which opened on March 3, 1946, and closed March 1, 1969. Diphtheria, smallpox, measles, scarlet fever and typhoid fever were early epidemics to hit the town. Midwives were employed in childbirth deliveries.

The Regina Qu'Appelle Regional Health Authority assesses and provides health care within the Regina-Qu'Appelle region. Regina and Indian Head both have hospitals and special care homes in the Regina Qu'Appelle Regional Health Authority region which are near to Qu'Appelle. Fort Qu'Appelle is home to the Fort Qu'Appelle Community Health Services Centre, All Nations' Healing Hospital and the Echo Lodge Special Care Home.

== Notable people ==
Edward A. Rawlinson

- Vernon Barford, (10 September 1876 - 22 April 1963) organist, choirmaster, teacher, homesteader in the Qu'Appelle district between 1895 and 1900.
- Annie Babbitt Bulyea (1863-1934), Canadian temperance leader, moved to Qu'Appelle with husband, George H. V. Bulyea
- George H. V. Bulyea, Canadian politician moved to Qu'Appelle, District of Assiniboia, North-West Territories in 1893. He taught at Qu'Appelle High School. In 1905, he was appointed the first Lieutenant Governor of Alberta. He, his wife Annie and their only son are buried in the Qu'Appelle Cemetery
- Percival Gordon, a judge of the Saskatchewan Court of Appeal, born and educated as to primary and high school in Qu'Appelle.
- Group Captain Claude Hilton Keith (1891–1966), born in Qu'Appelle, was an early pioneer of air gunnery who played a central role in the preparation of the Royal Air Force for World War Two. His career ended prematurely after championing the rights of R.A.F personnel posted in Canada.
- Edward Rawlinson, (June 2, 1912 – 1992), born in Qu'Appelle showed leadership in broadcasting across several radio stations to Saskatchewan and was the youngest chartered accountant in Canada.

== See also ==
- List of communities in Saskatchewan
- List of towns in Saskatchewan
- Anglican Diocese of Qu'Appelle
- Anglican Church of Canada
