= Barford =

Barford may refer to:

== Places ==
=== England ===
- Barford, Hampshire
- Barford, Norfolk
- Barford, Warwickshire
- Barford St. John, Oxfordshire
  - The parish of Barford St. John and St. Michael, Oxfordshire
- Barford St Martin, Wiltshire
- Barford St. Michael, Oxfordshire
- Great Barford, Bedfordshire, which gives its name to the Hundred of Barford
- Little Barford, Bedfordshire
  - Little Barford Power Station

=== Canada ===
- Barford, Quebec, former township, now part of Coaticook

== People ==
- Anne Barford, American rugby union player
- David Barford, British medical researcher
- Ian Barford, American actor
- John Leslie Barford (1886-1937), English poet
- Serie Barford, New Zealand performance poet
- Vernon Barford (1876-1963), English photographer and musician
- William Barford (died 1792), English scholar and clergyman

== Other uses ==
- Barford Park, country house and park near Bridgwater, Somerset, England

== See also ==
- Barfield (disambiguation)
