= Sabena technics =

1968 Independent MRO provider

- Industry: Avionics; Aircraft maintenance
- Founder: Michel Marchais
- Headquarters: France, Paris
- Key people: Rodolphe Marchais
- Number of employees: 3000
- Website: sabenatechnics.com

Created in 1968, Sabena technics is an independent MRO (maintenance, repair, and overhaul) provider offering services to civil and military aircraft operators.

== History ==
1968: Founding of Touraine Air Transport by Michel Marchais

The air transport company Touraine Air Transport (TAT) was born in 1968 thanks to Michel Marchais (father of Rodolphe Marchais), a pioneer in the developments which were to lead the way in the air transport sector. TAT was to become the first independent regional company in Europe. TAT let go of its airline company in 1996 to focus on industrial activities: aircraft maintenance (TAT Industries) and leasing of aircraft (TAT leasing) provided to third-party airlines.

2000: TAT Industries acquires AOM Industries

The acquisition of the maintenance and engineering company AOM Industries, based in Nîmes and originally the maintenance department of the AOM airline, allows TAT Industries to develop its activities in airframe maintenance as well as its presence in the military sector.

2005: TAT Industries acquires Sabena technics

Sabena Technics, the maintenance department of the former Belgian national airline, based in Brussels and specialized in the maintenance of narrow and widebody aircraft, gives TAT Industries the opportunity to extend its offer, to develop its manufacturing base and to secure a strategic opening into central and northern Europe markets. The Brussels site left the group in July 2014, becoming an independent company under the name Sabena Aerospace, a name that reflects Belgium's deep connection to the original Sabena airline (Sabena being an acronym for "Société Anonyme Belge d'Exploitation de Navigation Aérienne").

2007: The EADS Sogerma sites in Mérignac and in Tunisia as well as EADS Barfield join Sabena technics Group

Sogerma services, originally the MRO services provider at EADS Sogerma and based in Bordeaux, brings to the group a new structure capable of providing further support to both civil and military customers as well as an important design office and an entity dedicated to the training and certification of technicians working on all types of Airbus.

Barfield, renamed “Barfield, a Sabena technics company,” based in Miami, Phoenix, Louisville and Bogotá, specializes in the maintenance and repair of components, customized global support packages, management and distribution of spare parts, and Ground Support Test Equipment. The acquisition of this company consolidates the presence of Sabena technics across the Atlantic. This pooling of expertise and resources allows an improved response to the requirements of airlines based in North and South America.

== Sites ==
Sabena technics is present across 15 sites worldwide and its head office is based in Paris. The group also provides its customers with line maintenance operations at many other airports. This deployment is part of a key principle for the company, service proximity.

At Dinard-Pleurtuit-Saint-Malo airport, the facilities extend over a surface area of 35,000 m^{2}, with a workforce of 650. More specifically aimed at regional transport and narrow-body aircraft, these facilities include, in particular: three hangars which can accommodate up to 11 aircraft at the same time, and a painting hangar approved by Airbus, which can accommodate all aircraft up to the Boeing 757. This site also houses its JV (Hydrep) with Messier Services, in charge of regional and corporate aircraft and helicopter landing gear overhaul.

At Nîmes-Garons airport, Sabena technics has 20,000 m^{2} facilities, with a workforce of over 400. Sabena technics also benefits from a site in Marseille (2,170 m^{2}) where follow-up services are carried out on all fire-fighting aircraft belonging to the French Civil Security (Tracker and Canadair) during the forest fire season. The activities in Nîmes are more focused on base maintenance of narrow and wide-body aircraft (including the B767/757 and the KC-135), as well as engineering. A main hangar, divided into three bays, can accommodate four large aircraft at once. It is in Nîmes that the heavy maintenance of the Canadair water bombers of the French Civil Security is carried out during winter time.

At Bordeaux-Mérignac airport, the group has maintenance capacities for all types of Airbus aircraft as well as military aircraft like the C-130. The airframe maintenance activities are carried out within four hangars, which extend over 86,000 m^{2} of technical facilities. Overhaul and repair services of components are provided by workshops specialized in avionics, electromechanics, mechanics, hydraulics, helicopter landing gear, air conditioning and fuel. All of these operational activities are supported by the company's own backshops such as sheet metal working, machining, surface treatment workshops and painting.

The sites in Papeete and Nouméa, which represent a total surface area of 4,800 m^{2} and employ a workforce of 100, are dedicated to the management and maintenance of aircraft belonging to the French Ministry of Defence.

Sabena technics is also present in Monastir via its Nouvelair joint venture and in Liège via its joint venture (X-air services) with TNT Airways.
