= Percival Gordon =

Canadian lawyer

Percival H. Gordon

Justice of the Saskatchewan Court of Appeal
- In office 1935–1961

Personal details
- Born: January 27, 1884 Qu'Appelle, North-West Territories, Canada
- Died: April 6, 1975 (aged 91)

Percival H. Gordon, OC (January 27, 1884 – April 6, 1975) was a Canadian lawyer and a Justice of the Saskatchewan Court of Appeal.

Born in Qu'Appelle, North-West Territories of Scottish-Presbyterian immigrant parents and completing primary and high school in the town, he graduated with a Bachelor of Arts degree from the University of Toronto in 1905 and a master's degree in 1906. He was called to the Saskatchewan bar in 1908 and appointed King's Counsel in 1927. He "served as chancellor of the Anglican diocese of Qu’Appelle from 1921 to 1942 and as executive chairman of the Canadian Red Cross." He was appointed to the Saskatchewan Court of Appeal in 1935 and retired in 1961.

In 1968, he was made an Officer of the Order of Canada.
