= Barfield (company) =

American aircraft maintenance company

Barfield, Inc.
- Type: Public (subsidiary of AFI KLM E&M)
- Industry: Aviation; Aircraft maintenance
- Founded: Miami, Florida, U.S. (1945)
- Founder: James W. Barfield
- Headquarters: Miami, Florida, U.S.
- Area served: North America
- Key people: Tommaso Auriemma (CEO)
- Services: Component Repair, Ground support Test Equipment, Distribution, Trading
- Number of employees: 500 (2020)
- Parent: AFI KLM E&M
- Website: barfieldinc.com

Barfield, Inc., is an aircraft maintenance company with a concentration in repair overhaul and support. Its services include component repair and overhaul, ground support test equipment, and airline service programs.

Barfield's business concentration includes support programs for regional and longer haul airlines, comprising narrow and wide body fleets, and also manufactures and distributes a full line of ground support test equipment. Among its other capabilities, the company manages a distribution network for OEMs.

== History ==
The company was founded in 1945, with the creation of the instrument and avionics facility in Miami, Florida. Additional locations were created at Tempe, Arizona, in 2000 and Louisville, Kentucky, in 2003.

In 2003, the company was incorporated into EADS North America under the division name EADS Sogerma Barfield. EADS Barfield was then bought in 2007 by the TAT Group subsidiary of Sabena technics, upon which the company returned to its original name.

Since July 1, 2014, Barfield, Inc., has been acquired by the Air France Industries KLM Engineering & Maintenance Group (AFI KLM E&M). The Franco-Dutch group has taken full control of Barfield. Together with its sister company Aero Maintenance Group, Barfield is now part of the AFI KLM E&M network, a major MRO provider. With a workforce of 14,000, AFI KLM E&M offers technical support for airlines, ranging from airframe maintenance to engine overhaul and repair and supply of components.
