= Vernon Barford =

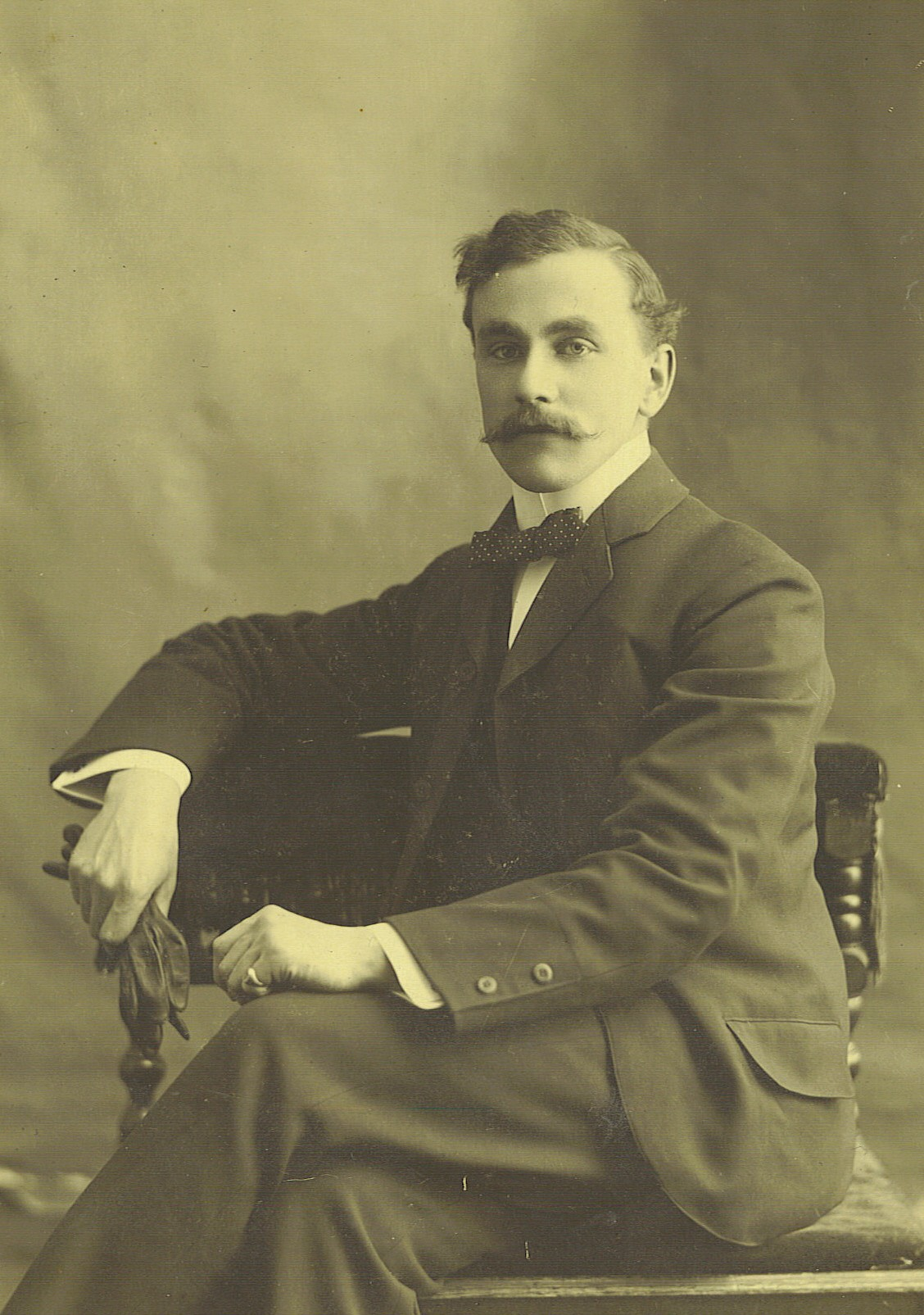
- Born: 10 September 1876; Crowthorne in Berkshire, England
- Died: 22 April 1963 (aged 86); Edmonton, Alberta
- Occupations: Photographer, Musician; Organist, Choirmaster; Teacher, Farmer
- Spouse: Agnes Lynch
- Children: Marjorie, Cuthbert Alan, Jack, Jim

Vernon West Barford (10 September 1876 – 22 April 1963) was an English photographer, musician, organist, choirmaster and teacher. Barford, nicknamed "Man of Many Talents," was born in Crowthorne in Berkshire, England.

== Early life ==
He began piano lessons at four and attended the choir school of Worcester Cathedral from 1887 to 1892. Having failed entrance exams to Oxford University, he moved in 1898 to Qu'Appelle, District of Assiniboia in the North-West Territories (most which became the southern third in territory, half of population, of the province of Saskatchewan, Canada in 1905 after his departure). He began to farm and after a year, he began to teach piano.

On 15 January 1900 he moved to Edmonton, Alberta and became choirmaster for All Saints parish church, which became pro-cathedral of the Church of England in Canada in 1914, and stayed in that post for fifty-six years. In 1903 Barford organized the Edmonton Amateur Operatic Society, and was musical director for seven years. In 1904 he created Edmonton's first opera, The Chimes of Normandy. On 1 September 1905, when Alberta had joined the Dominion of Canada, Barford conducted the first official concert at Thistle Rink. in 1908 Barford worked with three others to create the Alberta Provincial Festival (now known as the Edmonton Kiwanis Music Festival) and was president of it for seven years. In 1912, Barford began the University of Alberta Glee Club. Then in 1924 he was awarded with the honorary degree by the U of A. In the 1927–1929 season, Barford was the first conductor of the Edmonton Symphony Orchestra, and from 1932 to 1937 Vernon gave several series of lectures, 60 lectures in total over the radio with CKUA. In 1945 he was made a fellow in the Canadian College of Organists. In 1955 he conducted another concert for the 50th anniversary of the province of Alberta, like the one he did in the year 1905. On 22 April 1963, Barford died at the age of 87. Vernon Barford Junior High School is named in his honour.
