= Barfield, Tennessee =

Unincorporated community in Tennessee, US

Coordinates: 35°47′06″N 86°25′36″W

Barfield is an unincorporated community in Rutherford County, Tennessee, in the United States.

== History ==
The community may have been named for Frederick Barfield, a local landowner.
