= The Legend of Qu'appelle Valley =

Poem by Emily Pauline Johnson

"The Legend of the Qu'Appelle Valley" is a poem written by Emily Pauline Johnson that tells the tale of a young First Nations' man who, upon returning from a hunting trip and anxious to be home where his betrothed awaits him, hears a voice, soft and tenderly, saying his name. He replies, "Qu'Appelle?", or, in French, "Who calls?", but receives no answer, save his own echo. When he arrives to his village he discovers that the young woman he was to marry died suddenly, and with her dying breath cried out his name.

And thus, the Qu'Appelle Valley received its name. Although fictional, this story is based upon the unusual phenomenon reported by Métis trader Daniel Harmon, in which the Indigenous people of the area, whenever they heard (or thought they heard) a voice would reply: "Kâ-têpwêt?", "Who calls?", or "Qui appelle?", in Cree, English, and French respectively.
