= Wanda Barfield =

American pediatrician

Wanda D. Barfield
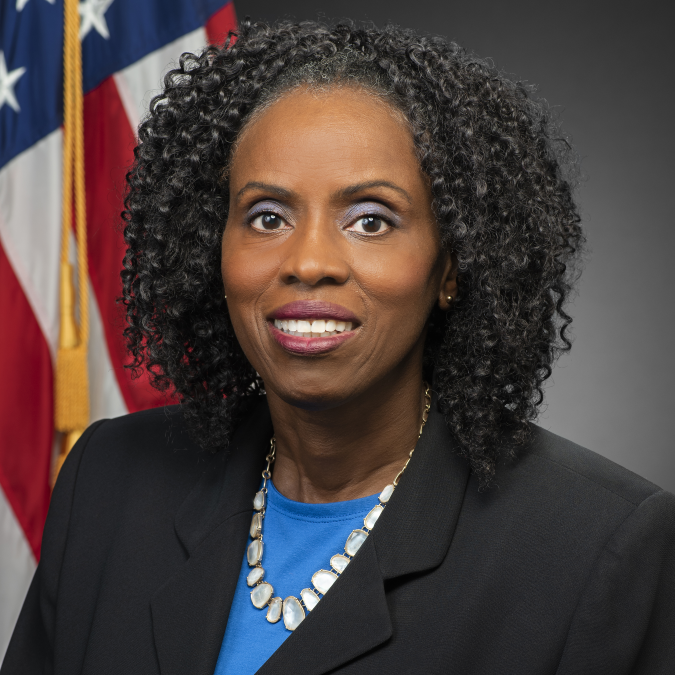
- Official photograph as Director of the Division of Reproductive Health at the CDC, 2024
- Education: Harvard University; University of California, Irvine
- Scientific career
- Workplaces: Walter Reed Army Medical Center; Centers for Disease Control and Prevention

Wanda D. Barfield is an American pediatrician who is the Director of the Division of Reproductive Health in the Centers for Disease Control and Prevention National Center for Chronic Disease Prevention and Health Promotion. She is Assistant Surgeon General in the United States Public Health Service. Barfield works to improve healthcare provided to women and infants. She was elected to the National Academy of Medicine in 2025.

== Early life and education ==
Barfield earned her bachelor's degree at the University of California, Irvine. She studied medicine and public health at Harvard University. She was a pediatric resident at Walter Reed Army Medical Center and served as a Rear Admiral in the United States Public Health Service.

== Research and career ==
Barfield worked in the Madigan Army Medical Center, where she directed the Neonatal Intensive Care Unit. She joined the Centers for Disease Control and Prevention in 2000. Her work considered neo- and perinatal health. She was promoted to Division Director in 2010. She is Director of the CDC Division of Reproductive Health, where she looks to improve the healthcare provided to women and infants. She studied how opioids, natural disasters and COVID-19 impacted pregnant and postpartum women. Barfield initiated a program called "Hear her", which supports Black women in accessing reproductive healthcare.

Barfield was elected to the National Academy of Medicine in 2025.

== Selected publications ==
- Ann R Stark; American Academy of Pediatrics Committee on Fetus and Newborn (1 November 2004). "Levels of neonatal care". Pediatrics. 114 (5): 1341–1347. doi:10.1542/peds.2004-1697. ISSN 0031-4005. PMID 15520119. Wikidata Q35936106.
- Sarah Marie Lasswell; Wanda Denise Barfield; Roger William Rochat; Lillian Blackmon (1 September 2010). "Perinatal regionalization for very low-birth-weight and very preterm infants: a meta-analysis". JAMA. 304 (9): 992–1000. doi:10.1001/jama.2010.1226. ISSN 0098-7484. PMID 20810377. Wikidata Q43859957.
- Carrie K Shapiro-Mendoza; Kay M Tomashek; Milton Kotelchuck; Wanda Barfield; Angela Nannini; Judith Weiss; Eugene Declercq (1 February 2008). "Effect of late-preterm birth and maternal medical conditions on newborn morbidity risk". Pediatrics. 121 (2): e223-32. doi:10.1542/peds.2006-3629. ISSN 0031-4005. PMID 18245397. Wikidata Q64127228.
