= Maoluo River =

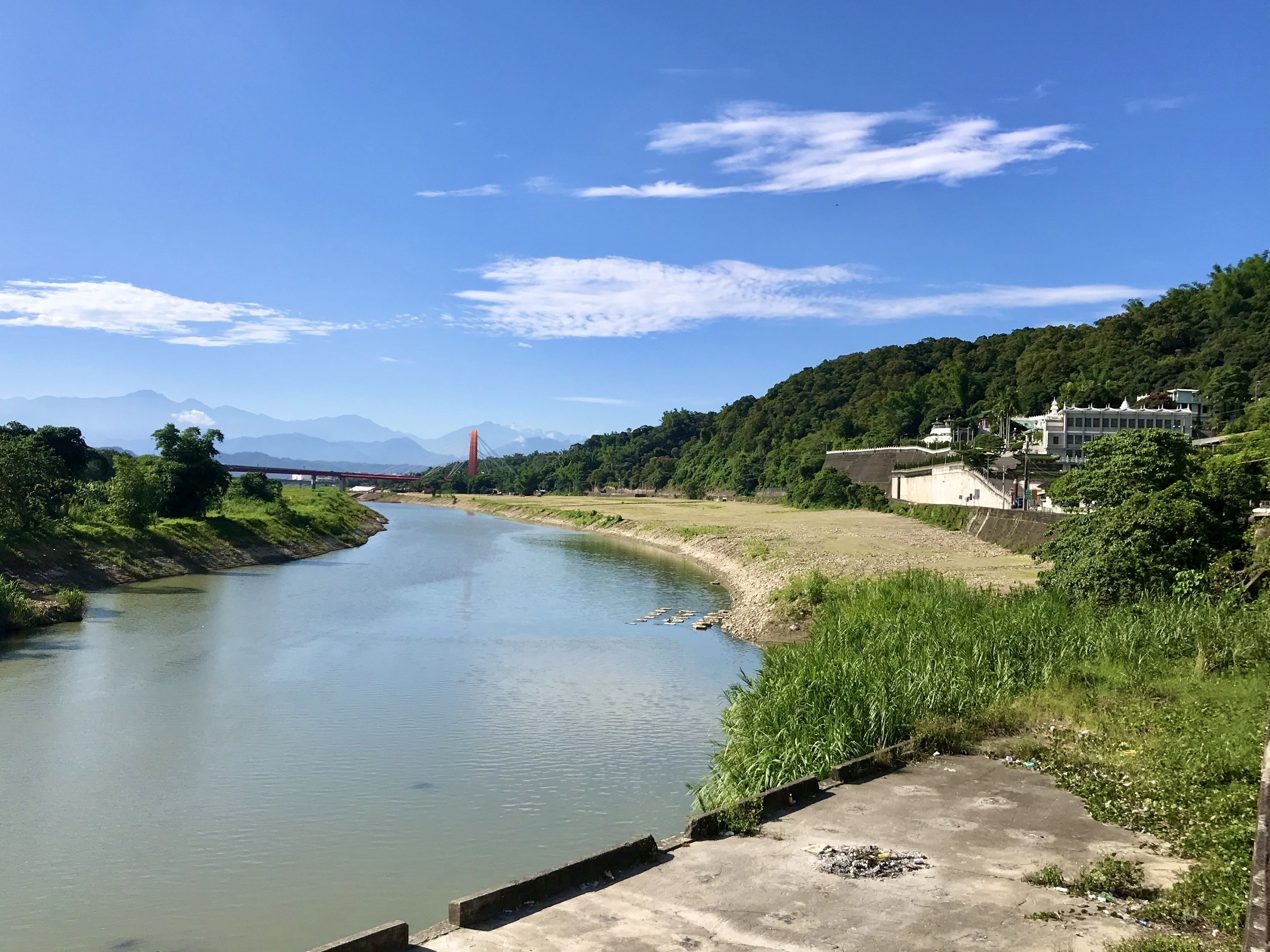

- Map showing the mouth of Maoluo River at its confluence with the Wu River

Location
- Country: Taiwan

Physical characteristics
- Source
  - location: Jiufener Mountain (九份二山), Jialishan Range
  - coordinates: 23.9358°N 120.8317°E
  - elevation: 1,178 m (3,865 ft)
- Mouth
  - location: Wu River at Wuri, Taichung
  - coordinates: 24.0603°N 120.6277°E
- Length: 47 km (29 mi)
- Basin size: 377 km^{2} (146 sq mi)

Basin features
- River system: Wu River

The Maoluo River (Chinese: 貓羅溪; pinyin: Māoluó Xī; Wade–Giles: Mao^{1}-lo^{2} Hsi^{1}) is a tributary of the Wu River (Dadu River) in Taiwan. It is the main tributary on the left bank of the Wu River. Originating from the Jialishan Range, it flows east of the Bagua Plateau through Nantou County, Changhua County, and Taichung City for 47 kilometers.

== See also ==
- List of rivers in Taiwan
