= Wanda (disambiguation) =

Wanda is a given name.

Wanda may also refer to:

== People ==
- Wanda people, an ethnic group in Tanzania
- For individual people named Wanda, see Wanda

== Geography ==
- Wanda, Illinois, United States
- Wanda, Minnesota, United States
- Wanda, Missouri, United States
- Wanda, West Virginia, United States
- Wanda Township, Adams County, Nebraska, United States
- Wanda Beach, Sydney, New South Wales, Australia
- Wanda, Burkina Faso
- Wanda, Argentina
- Wanda Mountains (完达山), in Mainland China
- Wanda River (萬大溪), in Taiwan
- Wanda (crater), a crater in the Akna Montes on Venus

== Entertainment ==
- Wanda (magazine), a weekly literature magazine in Warsaw
- Wanda (band), an Austrian indie pop band.
- Wanda (film), a 1970 American film
- A Fish Called Wanda, a 1988 British film
- Wanda, the fifth of Antonín Dvořák's 11 operas, based on a Polish legend
- Wanda, the title character of an 1883 novel by Ouida
- "Handa Wanda", song by The Wild Magnolias (1970)
- "Kinda Fonda Wanda" a song by Neil Young on his album Everybody's Rockin'

== Others ==
- 1057 Wanda, an asteroid
- Wanda Group (万达集团 / 大连万达), a Chinese conglomerate
  - Wanda Media, a film company
  - Dalian Wanda F.C. (大连万达足球俱乐部), former name of Dalian Shide F.C., a football club in Dalian, Liaoning, China
  - Wanda Metropolitano, stadium of Atlético Madrid sponsored by Wanda Group
- Wanda Films, a Spanish film distributing company
- Wanda Beach Murders, two unsolved Australian murders in 1965
- For tropical cyclones named Wanda, see List of storms named Wanda
- For Wanda the first ever captive orca, see List of captive orcas
