= Mukua =

Mukua may refer to:

- Mukua, or mucua, the fruit of the baobab Adansonia digitata as used in Angola
- Mukua River, a river in Taiwan

== See also ==
- Mukwa (disambiguation)
