= Baishuei River =

River in Taiwan

Coordinates: 23°21′01.0″N 120°28′41.0″E

- Baishuei River in Taiwan
- Native name: 白水溪 (Chinese)

Location
- Country: Taiwan

Physical characteristics
- Mouth
  - location: Jishui River
- Length: 20 km (12 mi)

The Baishuei River (Chinese: 白水溪; Hanyu Pinyin: Báishuǐ Xī; Tongyong Pinyin: Báishuěi Si; Wade–Giles: Pai^{2}-shui^{3} Hsi^{1}; Pe̍h-ōe-jī: Pe̍h-chúi-khe) is a river in Taiwan which flows through Tainan City for 20 km (12.427 mi). It is a tributary of Jishui River. Baihe Reservoir is located on Baishuei River. A church named for the river (Pe̍h-chúi-khe Kàu-hōe) was established in the 1870s.

== See also ==
- List of rivers in Taiwan
