= Nankang River =

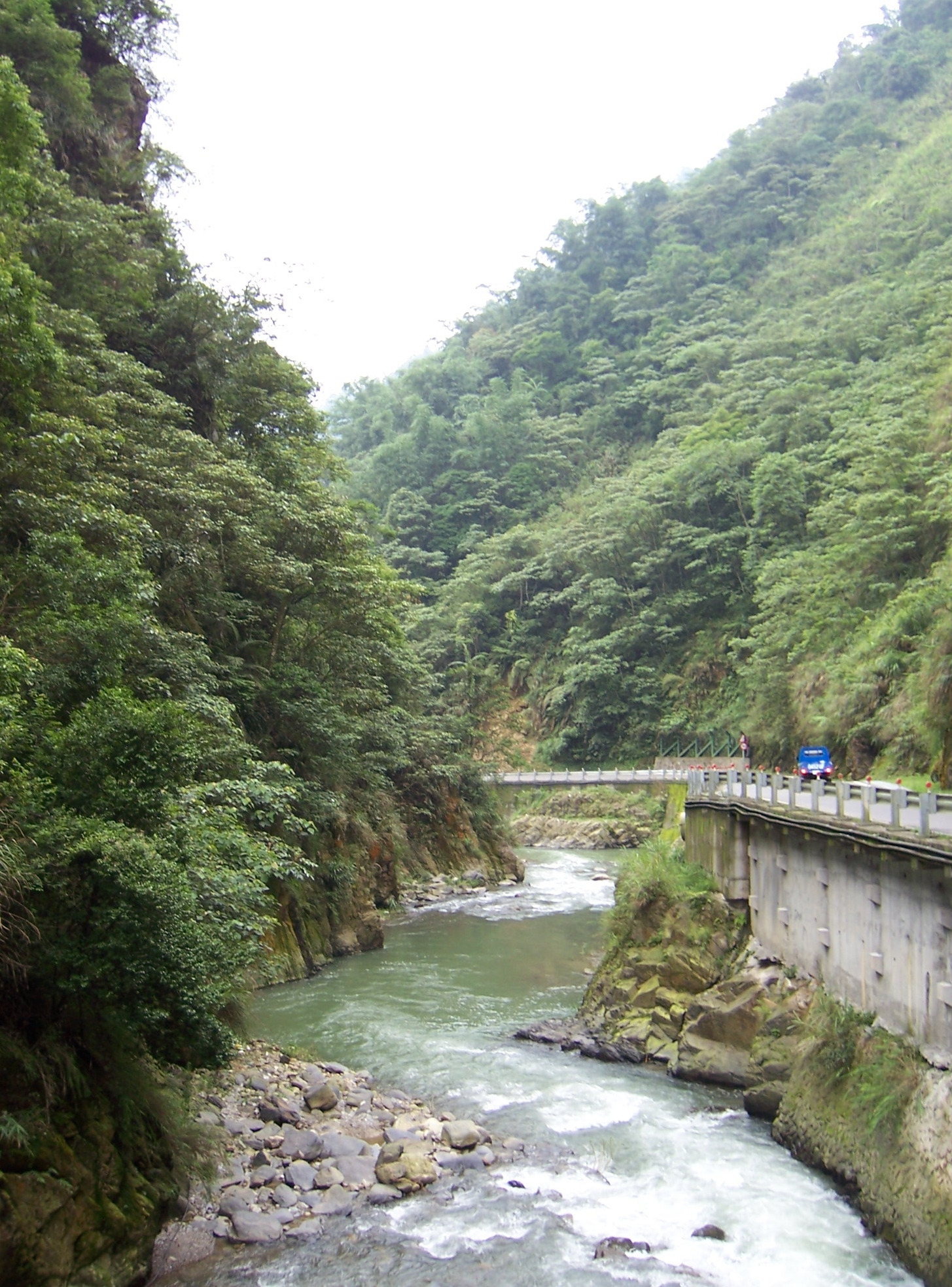
- The Nankang River flowing through the Niudong Valley in Puli Township, Nantou County

Location
- Country: Taiwan

Physical characteristics
- Source
  - location: Haben River

The Nankang River (Chinese: 南港溪; pinyin: Nángǎng Xī; Wade–Giles: Nan^{2}-kang^{3} Hsi^{1}), also called the Nanhong River, is a river that flows through Nantou County, Taiwan. Its main tributary is the Mei River. It is an important tributary for the Dadu River. It flows through Taichung City for 35 km.

== Overview ==
The river flows through the south part of Guoxing Township, through Puli Township, the eastern part of Yuchi Township, and the central-west part of Ren-ai Township. It is partially used for irrigation.

== See also ==
- List of rivers in Taiwan
