= Wanli =

Wanli was the era name of the Chinese Ming dynasty's Wanli Emperor (1563–1620), the 14th emperor of the Chinese Ming dynasty.

Wanli may also refer to:

== China ==
- Wanli District, Nanchang, district of Nanchang, Jiangxi, China
- Wan Li (1916–2015), Chinese Communist revolutionary and politician who served successively as Vice Premier, Chairman of the Standing Committee of the National People's Congress (NPC), and a member of the Chinese Communist Party (CCP) Secretariat and its Politburo.
- Fang Hui (1227–1307), or Wanli, Chinese historian
- Huang Wanli (1911–2001), Chinese hydrologist
- Yang Wanli (1127–1206), Chinese poet and politician
- Wanli Education Group, group in Zhejiang, China

== Taiwan ==
- Wanli District, New Taipei, a district in New Taipei, Taiwan
- Wanli River tributary of the Hualien River in Taiwan
