= Shangping River =

River in Taiwan

Coordinates: 24°43′46″N 121°06′30″E

Shangping River（Chinese：上坪溪）, located in northern Taiwan, is the upper reaches of Touqian River. It has a length of 44 kilometers and a drainage area of 253 square kilometers, spanning the eastern part of Zhudong Township, the western part of Hengshan Township, and the entire Wufeng Township in Hsinchu County. The upstream of Shangping River's main stream is Xakaro River, which originates from the northwestern side of Mount Kuai at an altitude of 2,512 meters in the Xueshan Range. It flows northwest to Shilu and then turns westward, and at Minsheng, it turns northward, passing through Tuchang and Qingquan. After converging with Maibala River at Taoshan, it is called Shangping River. The river continues to flow northward through Wufeng and Shangping, and after converging with Youluo River near Xiagongguan, it is renamed Touqian River.
