= Stone Dream =

2004 Taiwanese documentary by Hu Tai-li

Stone Dream (2004) is a Taiwanese documentary directed by Hu Tai-li and produced by the Taiwan Ethnographic Filmmaking Society. This film focus on Liu Pi-chia, following the Liu Pi-chia (1967) directed by Chen Yao-chi.

== Synopsis ==
The main character, Liu Pi-chia, was a soldier who came to Taiwan with the Nationalist government in the 1940s. Before retiring from the military, he joined the eastern development brigade, whose primary mission at the time was to reclaim riverbank areas for agriculture. In 1967, Liu's life was filmed with the same name Liu Pi-chia by director Chen Yao-chi, who was a student at the time. This work is acclaimed as Taiwan's first realist film.

Hu Tai-li researched veterans near the Mugua River in Hualien in 1986. While reviewing the data from the Guanghua Farm, she unexpectedly met Liu Pi-chia, who was in his seventies or eighties at the time. Starting in 1999, Hu began interviewing and filming Liu, and completed the documentary in 2004.

The film uses a first-person narration to depict this group of veterans from Mainland China who settled in Hualien, forming a new immigrant community based on their intermarriage with different ethnic groups in Taiwan. It touches on various themes such as father-son relationships, nurturing, the distinction between Han people and indigenous people, and identity issues. Besides documenting the interactions between Liu Pi-chia and his stepson A-Xing, the film also captures A-Xing and his local friends enjoying the local specialty, rose stones. "Stones" become a significant symbol in the film, connecting the father's efforts to reclaim by carrying stones and the son's pastime of collecting and admiring these stones.

== Festivals ==
- 2004 International Documentary Film Festival Amsterdam
- 2004 Golden Horse Awards – Best Documentary Film
- 2004 Golden Harvest Awards – Excellent Film Award
- 2005 Cinema South Film Festival, Iseral
- 2005 Nanook Film Fest, Italy
- 2006 Göttingen International Ethnographic Film Festival, Germany
- 2006 Musée d'ethnographie de Genève – Taiwan Film Festival
