= Tofu rocks =

Tourist attraction in Hsinchu, Taiwan

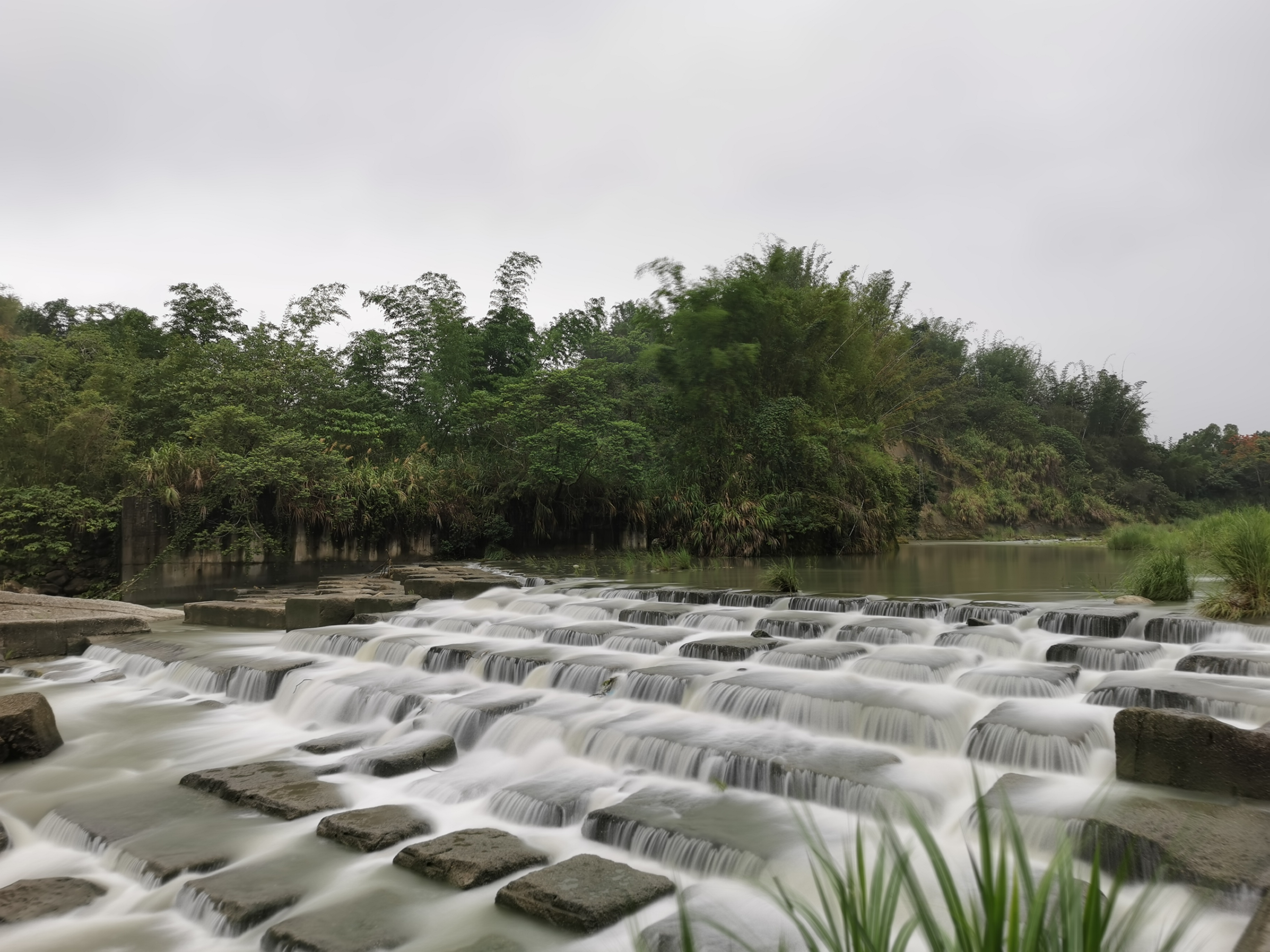
Long exposure shot of the tofu rocks in 2020.

The tofu rocks (Chinese: 豆腐岩) are concrete blocks placed at a short section of the Touqian River when it passes through Hsinchu, Taiwan. They were placed to slow the river as it nears its mouth to mitigate soil erosion as water breakers. The blocks gained their name as, over time, erosion by the river has worn the previously perfectly square blocks into tofu-looking rocks. The blocks are large enough to allow people to cross the river's width when the river level is low.

The tofu rocks gained popularity after long exposure shots of the rocks at dawn and before dusk were posted onto social media, making the rocks a tourist attraction in Hsinchu.

== History ==
The tofu rocks was the site of an environmental protest on 14 December 2019 where 300 protesters gathered to demand clean drinking water for the residents of Hsinchu County. They stood together on the riverbank as the river level was low and formed the Chinese character for water '水'. Environmental activists also tested the Touqian River's water quality, showing that it was poor quality for human consumption owing to waste water being pumped into the river upstream. The protesters demanded the Water Pollution Control Act be amended to force the government to stop factory and sewage runoffs from entering water sources used for drinking and irrigation. The protests were held ahead of the 2020 Taiwanese presidential election in the hope it would pressure politicians to act on their demands..

=== Popularity ===
The Taipei Times describes the tofu rocks as a popular subject for local photographers, who prefer taking long exposure shots of the rocks to create the effect of white mist rising from the Touqian. Dawn is the preferred time for photographers as it'll give the tofu rocks a red tint. Photos taken at that time and under that lighting condition are known as braised (hongshao) tofu photos. After photos posted online went viral on social media, the tofu rocks have attracted large crowds of tourists.

The Second River Management Office of Taiwan's Water Resources Agency has contended that the tofu rocks should not be considered a tourist attraction. It warned of the potential hazards and dangers posed by the area, especially after heavy rainfall when the rocks and slopes become slippery, and that those who explore the area should be careful. The blocks were not designed for people to stand on, so some blocks are more suitable than others.

== Gallery ==
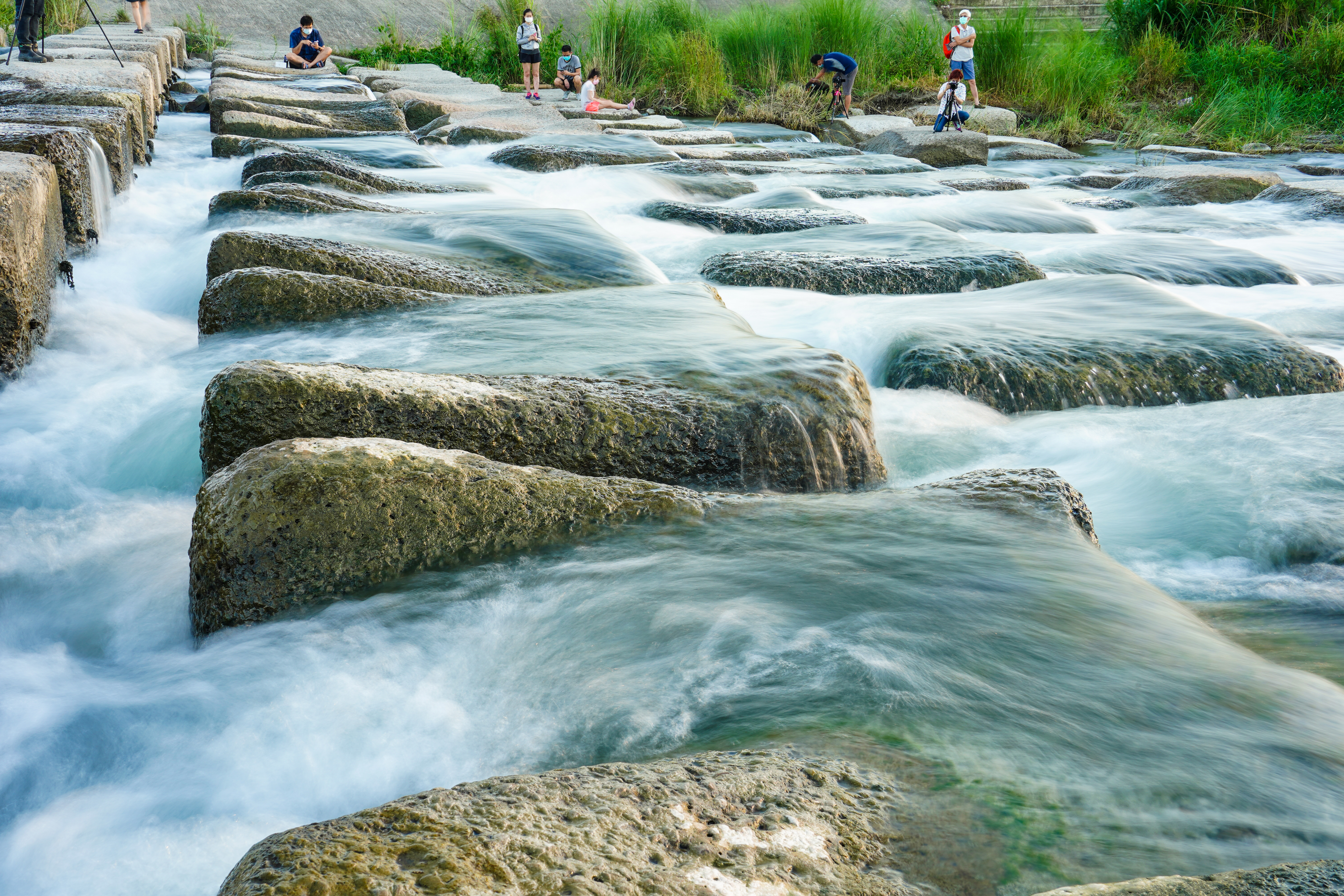

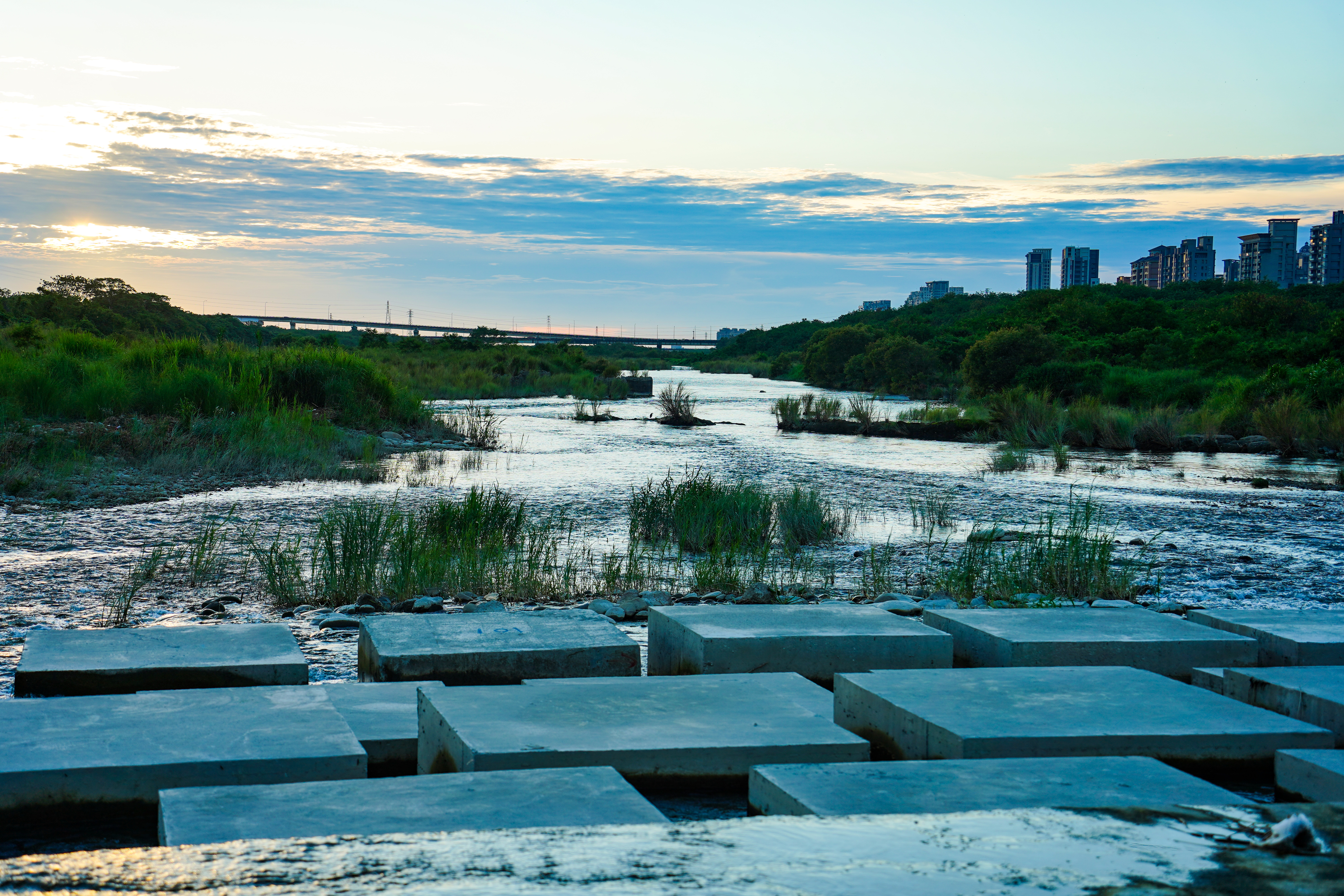

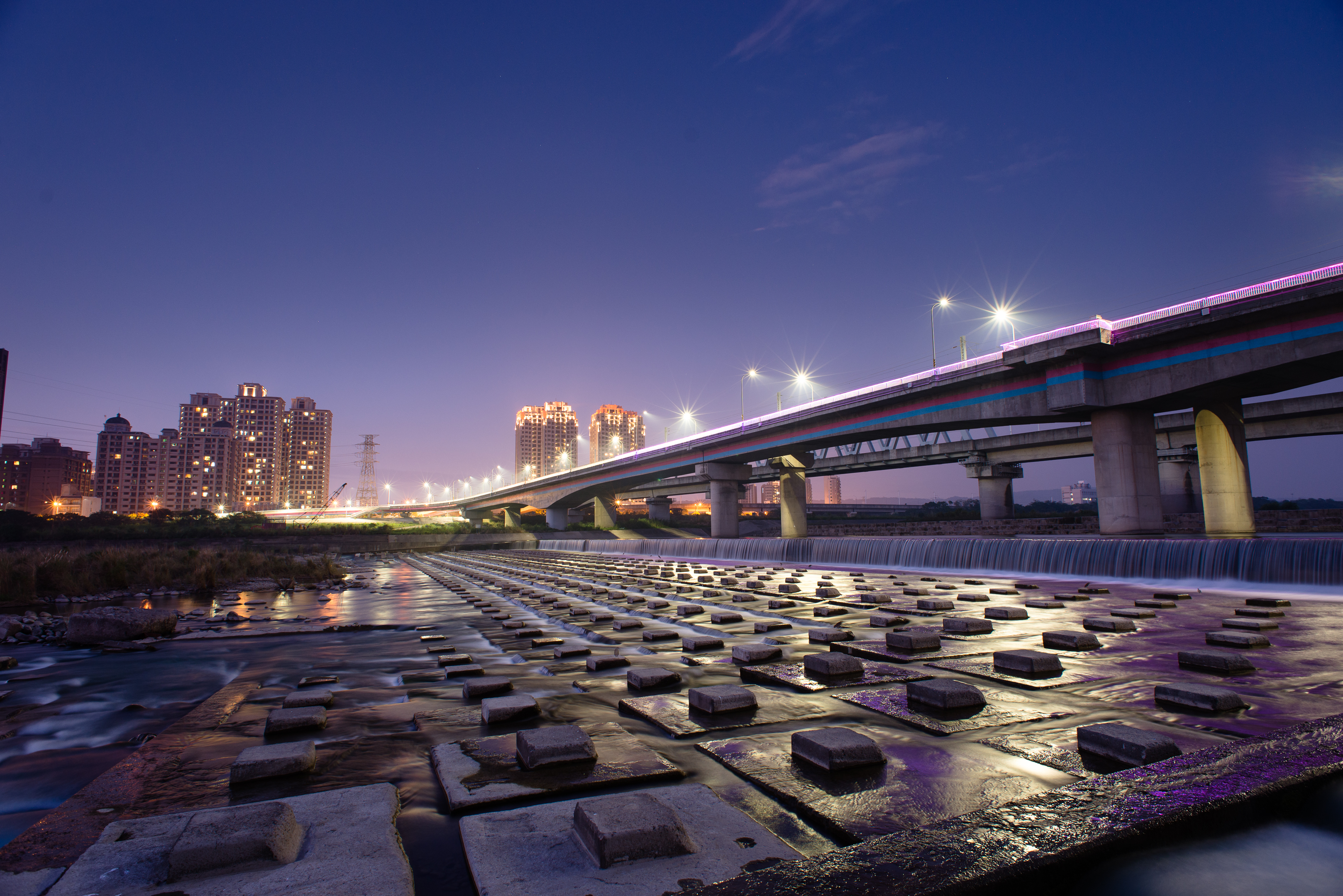

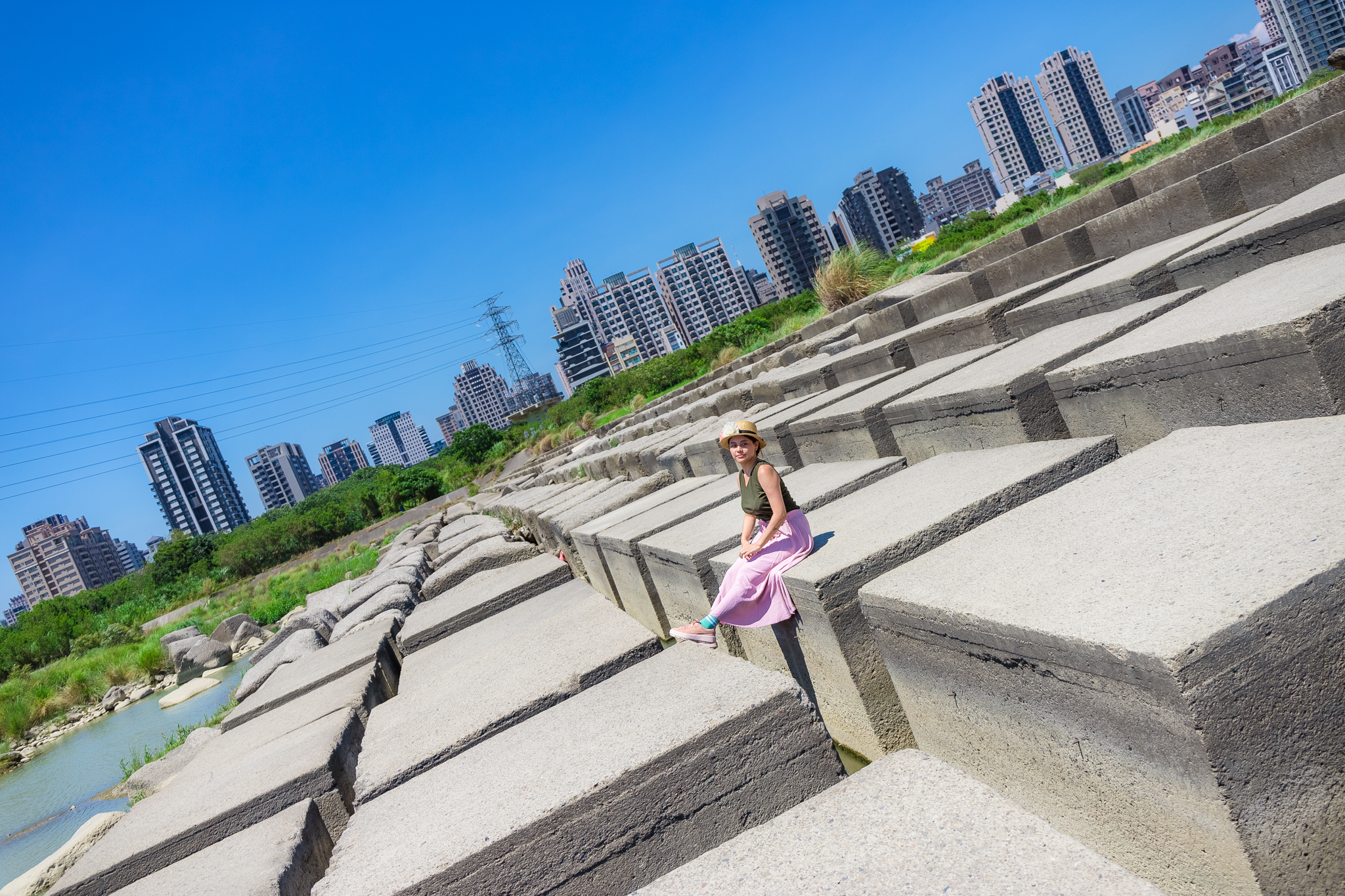
