= Mukwa =

Mukwa may refer to:

- Mukwa, Wisconsin, United States
- Mukwa (tree), Pterocarpus, also referred to as mukwa.

== See also ==
- Mukua (disambiguation)
- Mukhwas, a South Asian snack
