= List of rivers of Taiwan =

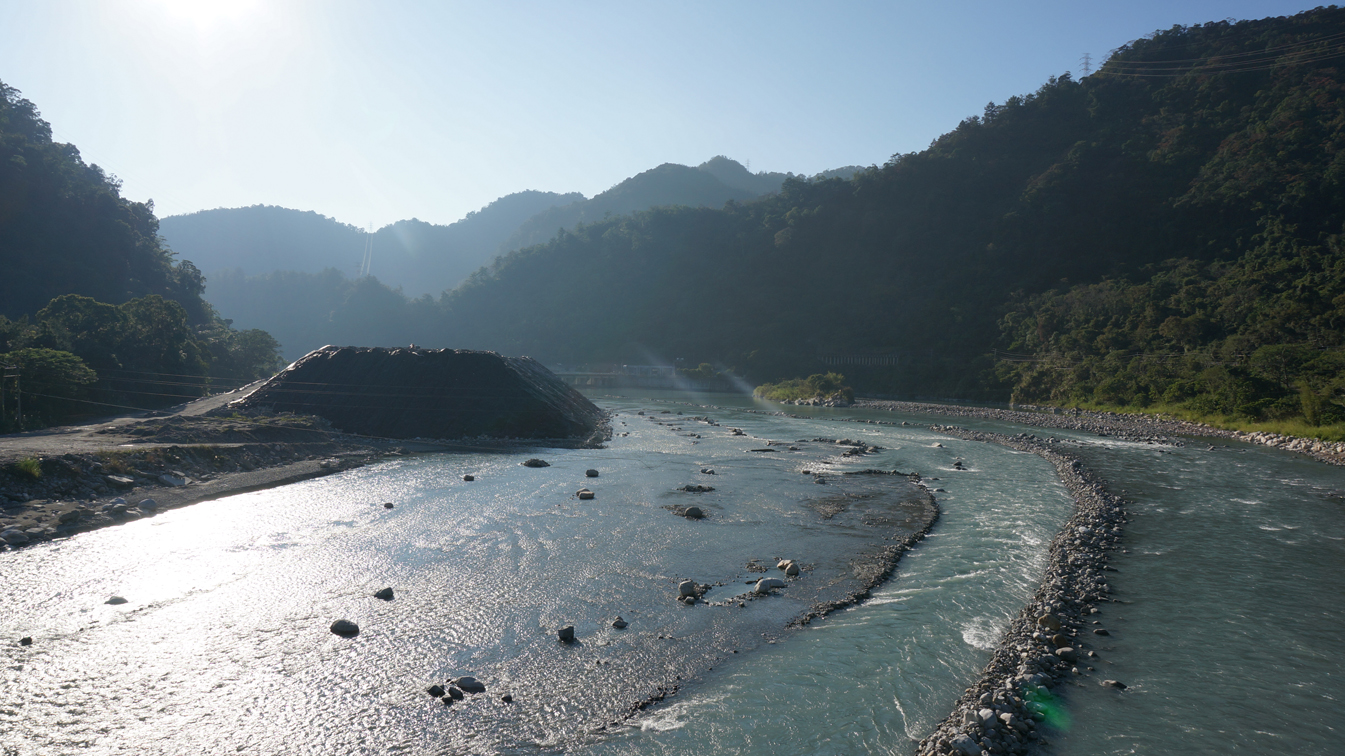
Dajia River in Taichung City

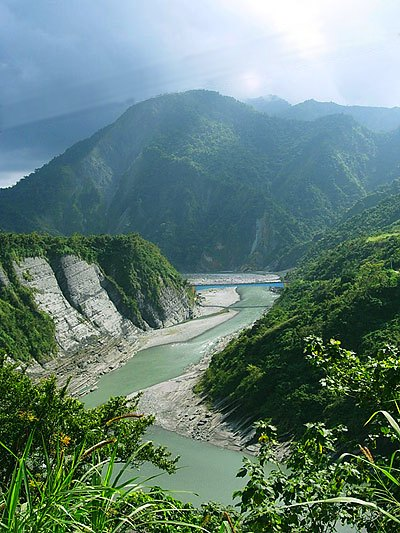
Xiuguluan River - Hualien County

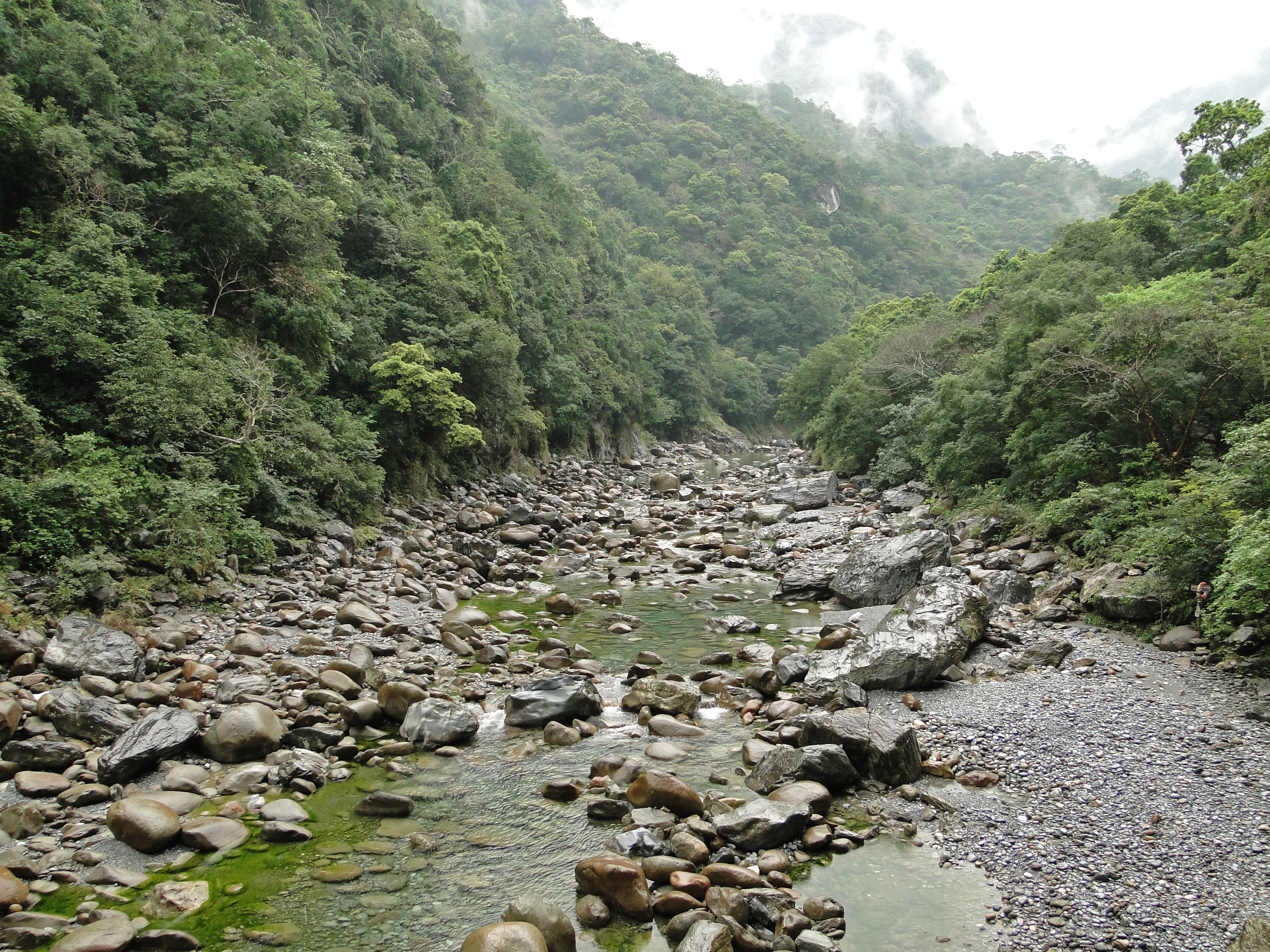
Shakadang River in Taroko National Park

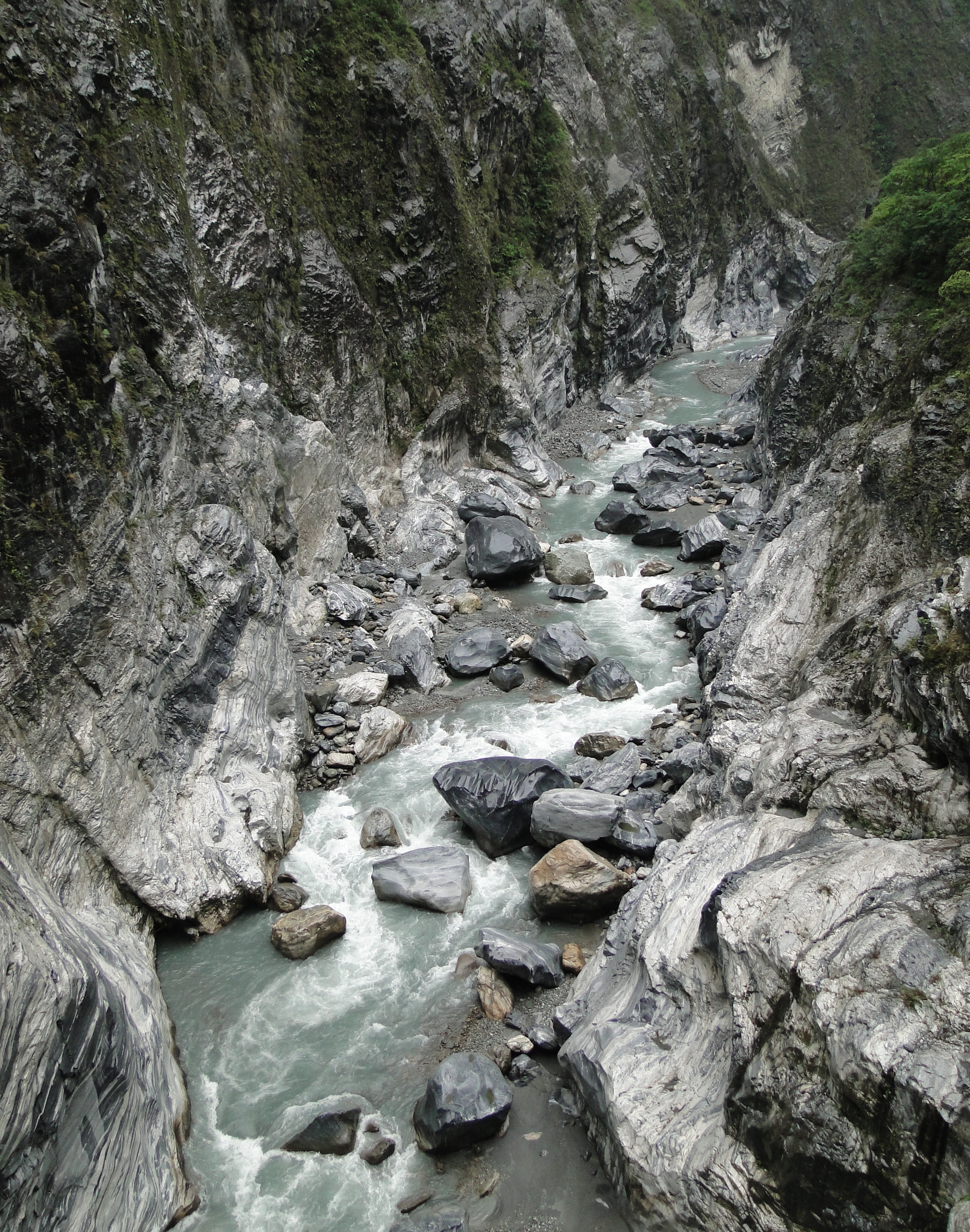
Liwu River in Taroko National Park

This is a list of rivers (溪 or 河) on Taiwan Island in the Republic of China that are longer than 19 kilometres (12 mi):

- Dongshan River - Yilan County - 24 km (15 mi)
- Lanyang River - Yilan County - 73 km (45 mi)
  - Yilan River - Yilan County - 25 km (16 mi)
  - Qingshui River - Yilan County - 25 km (16 mi)
  - Luodong River - Yilan County - 21 km (13 mi)
- Shuang River - New Taipei City - 27 km (17 mi)
- Tamsui River - New Taipei City, Taoyuan City, Taipei City, Hsinchu County - 159 km (99 mi)
  - Keelung River - New Taipei City, Taipei City, Keelung City - 89.4 km (55.6 mi)
  - Xindian River - New Taipei City, Taipei City - 82 km (51 mi)
    - Jingmei River - New Taipei City, Taipei City - 28.1 km (17.5 mi)
    - Beishi River - New Taipei City, Yilan County - 50 km (31 mi)
    - Nanshi River - New Taipei City - 45 km (28 mi)
  - Dahan River (Takekan River) - New Taipei City, Taoyuan City, Hsinchu County - 135 km (84 mi)
    - Sanxia River - New Taipei City - 22.6 km (14.0 mi)
- Nankan River - Taoyuan City - 31 km (19 mi)
- Fengshan River - Hsinchu County - 45 km (28 mi)
- Touqian River - Hsinchu County - 63 km (39 mi)
- Houlong River - Miaoli County - 58 km (36 mi)
  - Wenshui River - Miaoli County
- Da'an River - Miaoli County, Taichung City - 96 km (60 mi)
- Fanziliao River - Miaoli County
- Dajia River - Taichung City - 124 km (77 mi)
- Dadu River (also known as the Wu or Black River) - Taichung City, Changhua County, Nantou County - 116 km (72 mi)
  - Maoluo River - Taichung City, Changhua County, Nantou County - 47 km (29 mi)
  - Nankang River - Taichung City - 34 km (21 mi)
- Zhuoshui River - Nantou County, Changhua County, Yunlin County - 186 km (116 mi)
  - Qingshui River - Taichung City, Chiayi County, Tainan City - 51 km (32 mi)
  - Shuili River - Taichung City - 19 km (12 mi)
  - Wanta River - Taichung City - 37 km (23 mi)
  - Kashe River - Nantou County - 47 km (29 mi)
- Beigang River - Yunlin County, Chiayi County - 82 km (51 mi)
  - Tahukou River - Yunlin County - 33 km (21 mi)
  - Sandie River - Chiayi County - 35 km (22 mi)
- Puzi River - Chiayi County - 75 km (47 mi)
- Bazhang River - Chiayi County, Tainan City - 81 km (50 mi)
  - Touqian River - Tainan City - 28 km (17 mi)
- Jishui River - Tainan City - 65 km (40 mi)
  - Guichong River - Tainan City - 35 km (22 mi)
  - Baishui River (白水溪) - Tainan City - 20 km (12 mi)
- Zengwen River - Chiayi County, Tainan City, Tainan City - 130 km (81 mi)
  - Houku River – Nantou County, Tainan City - 51.4 km (31.9 mi)
- Yanshui River - Tainan City - 41 km (25 mi)
- Erren River - Tainan City, Kaohsiung City - 65 km (40 mi)
- Agongdian River - Kaohsiung City - 38 km (24 mi)
- Fengshan River - Kaohsiung City - 20 km (12 mi)
- Dianbao River - Kaohsiung City - 32 km (20 mi)
- Gaoping River - Kaohsiung City, Pingtung County - 171 km (106 mi)
  - Qishan River - Kaohsiung City, Pingtung County - 117 km (73 mi)
  - Ailiao River - Kaohsiung City, Pingtung County - 69 km (43 mi)
  - Wuluo River - Pingtung County
  - Laonong River - Kaohsiung City - 136 km (85 mi)
    - Zhuokou River - Kaohsiung City - 50 km (31 mi)
- Donggang River - Pingtung County - 47 km (29 mi)
- Linbian River - Pingtung County - 42 km (26 mi)
- Beinan River - Taitung County - 84 km (52 mi)
- Xiuguluan River - Hualien County - 104 km (65 mi)
  - Fuyuan River - Hualien County - 28 km (17 mi)
  - Fengping River - Hualien County - 37 km (23 mi)
  - Lekuleku River - Hualien County - 54 km (34 mi)
- Hualien River - Hualien County - 57 km (35 mi)
  - Mukua River - Hualien County - 42 km (26 mi)
  - Shoufeng River - Hualien County - 37 km (23 mi)
  - Wanli River - Hualien County - 53 km (33 mi)
- Heping River - Hualien County - 50 km (31 mi)

== See also ==
- Geography of Taiwan
- List of mountains in Taiwan
