= Nankan River =

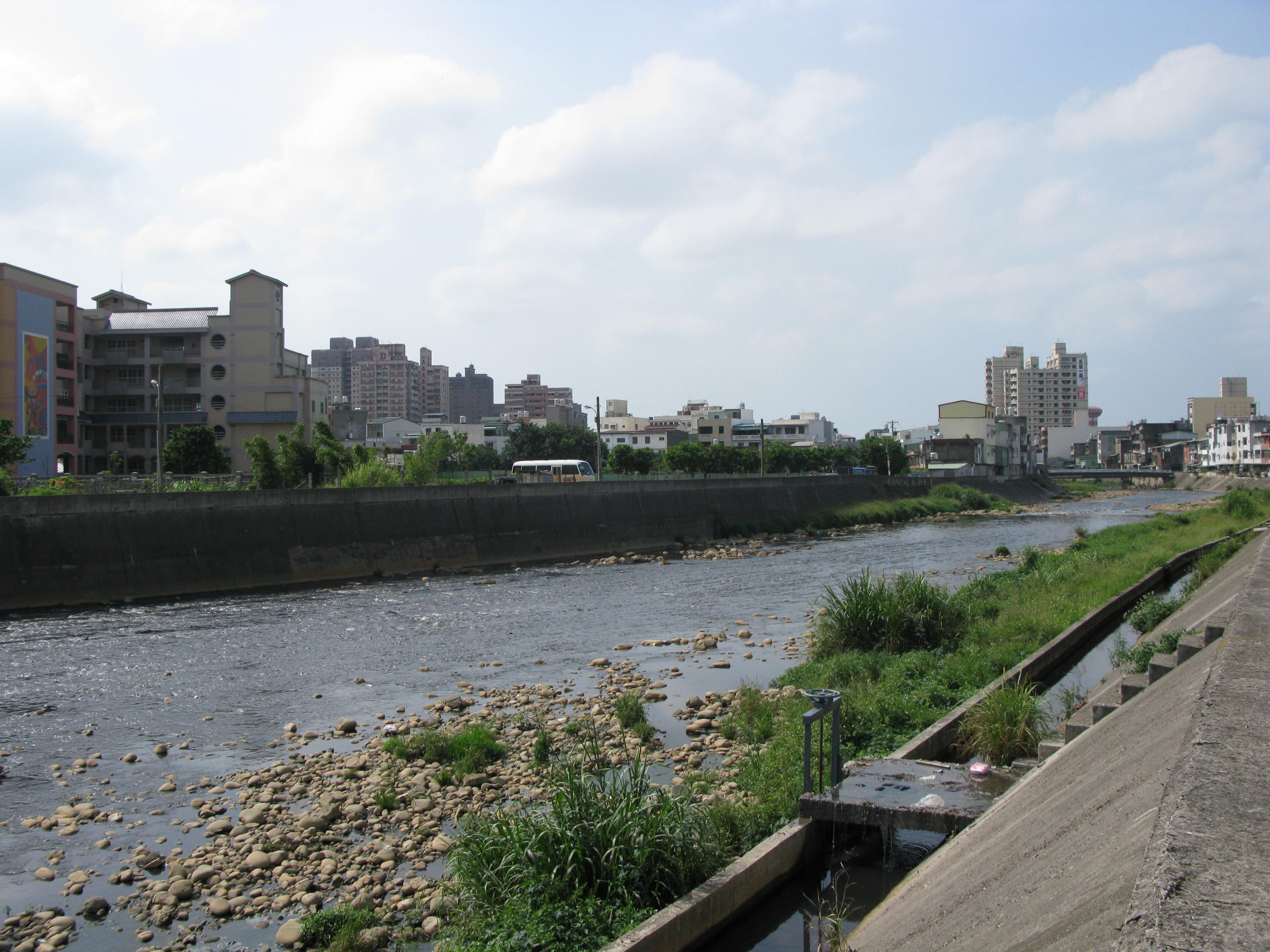

- Nankan River in Taiwan
- Native name: 南崁溪 (Chinese)

Location
- Country: Taiwan

Physical characteristics
- Mouth
  - location: Taiwan Strait: Taoyuan City, Dayuan District
  - coordinates: 25.118°N 121.249°E
- Length: 30.73 km (19.09 mi)
- Basin size: 214.67 km^{2} (82.88 mi^{2})
- Discharge
  - maximum: 1,450 m^{3}/s (51,000 cu ft/s)

The Nankan River (Chinese: 南崁溪; pinyin: Nánkàn Xī; Pe̍h-ōe-jī: Lâm-khàm Khe) is a river in northern Taiwan. It flows through Taoyuan City for 31 km (19 mi).

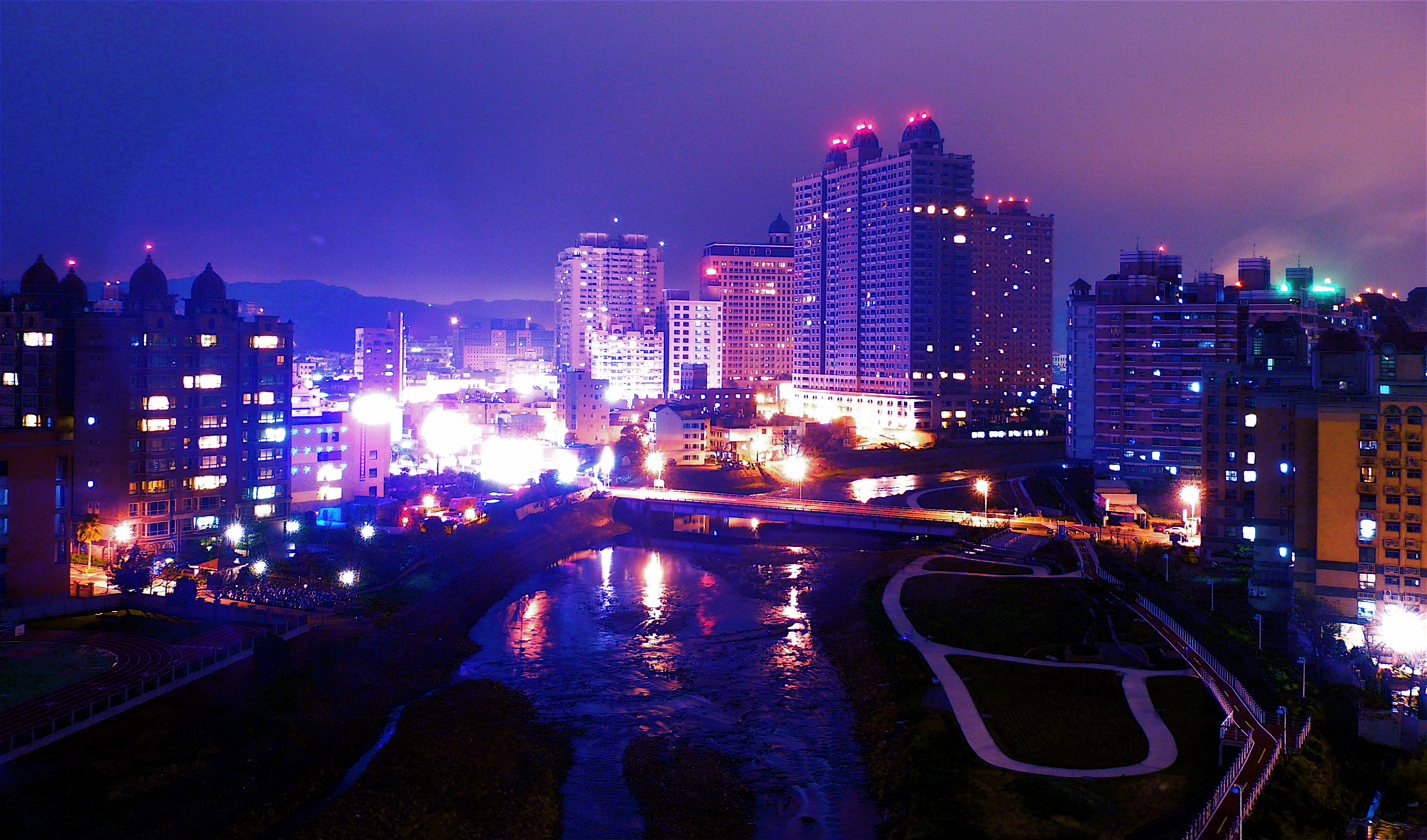
Apartment towers along the Nankan River in Luzhu District.

== See also ==
- List of rivers in Taiwan
