= Lanyang River =

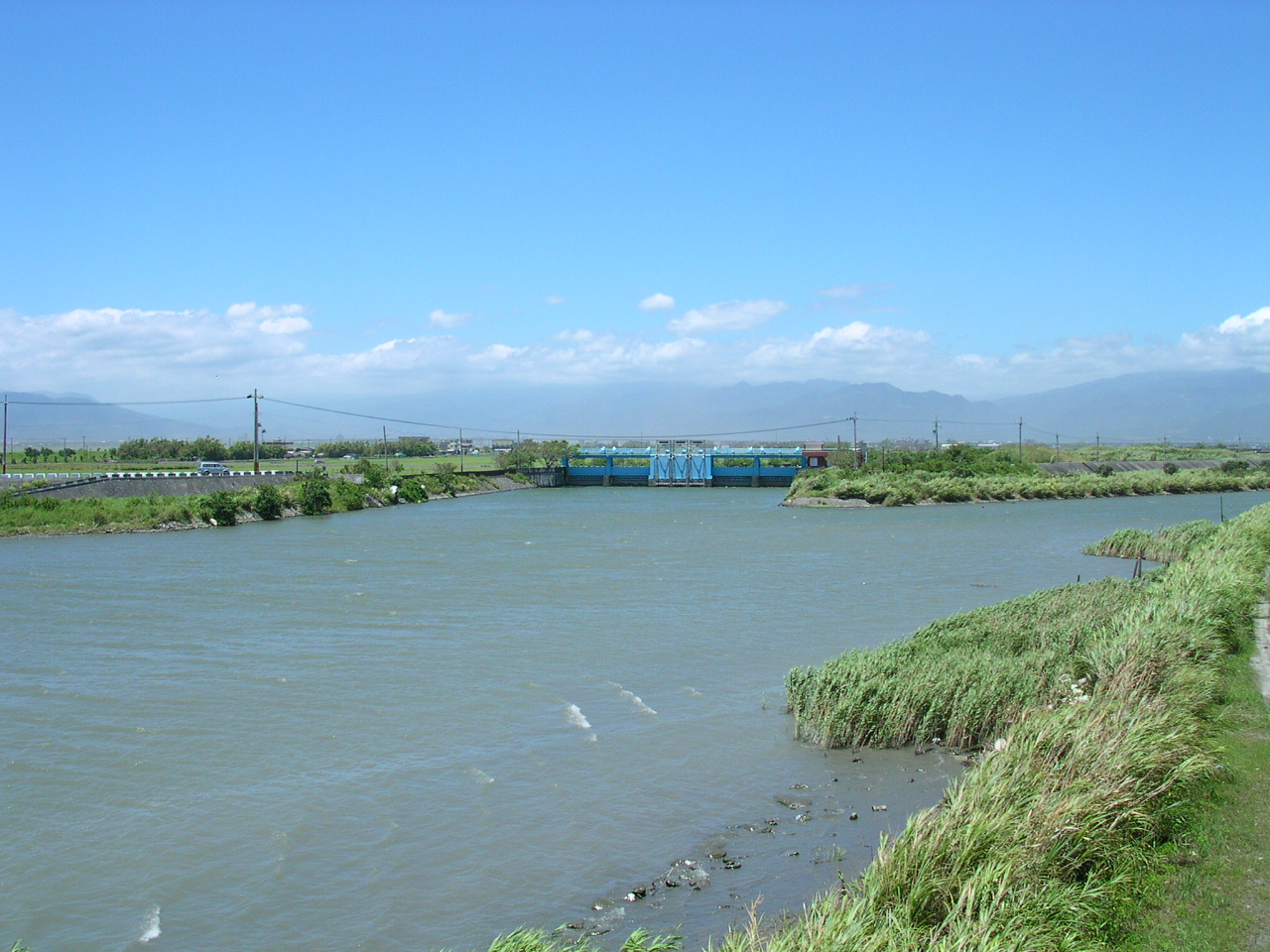

- Lanyang River in Taiwan
- Native name: 蘭陽溪 (Chinese)

Location
- Country: Taiwan

Physical characteristics
- Source
  - location: Nanhu Mountain
  - elevation: 3,536 m (11,601 ft)
- Mouth
  - location: Pacific Ocean: Yilan
  - coordinates: 24.715°N 121.834°E
- Length: 73 km (45 mi)
- Basin size: 978 km^{2} (378 sq mi)
- Discharge
  - minimum: 2.85 m^{3}/s
  - maximum: 5,420 m^{3}/s

Basin features
- Tributaries
  - left: Yilan River
  - right: Dongshan River

The Lanyang River (Chinese: 蘭陽溪; pinyin: Lányáng Xī) is a river in northeast Taiwan.

== Geology ==
The river flows through Yilan County for 73 kilometers, before discharging into the Pacific Ocean. It has a drainage basin area of 978 km^{2} with maximum peak flow of 5,420 m^{3}/s.

== See also ==
- List of rivers in Taiwan
