= Yilan River =

River in Yilan County, Taiwan

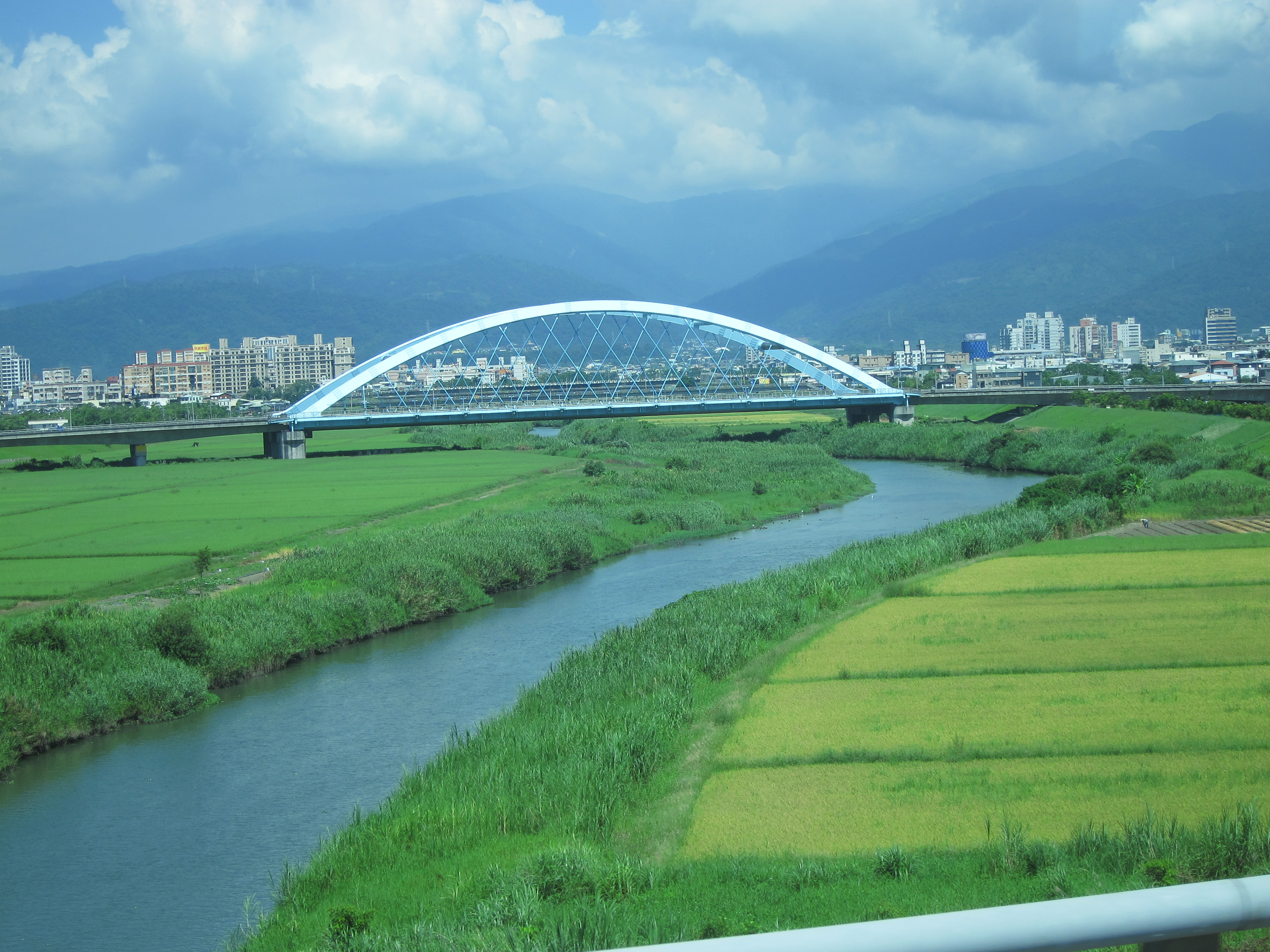

- Map showing the mouth of Yilan River at its confluence with the Lanyang River

Location
- Country: Taiwan

Physical characteristics
- Mouth
  - location: Zhuangwei, Yilan County
  - coordinates: 24.7181°N 121.8231°E
- Length: 25 km (16 mi)
- Basin size: 149 km^{2} (58 sq mi)

Basin features
- River system: Lanyang River

The Yilan River (Chinese: 宜蘭河; pinyin: Yílán Hé; Wade–Giles: I^{2}-lan^{2} Ho^{2}) is a tributary of the Lanyang River in Yilan County, northeast Taiwan. It flows through Yilan for 25 kilometers.

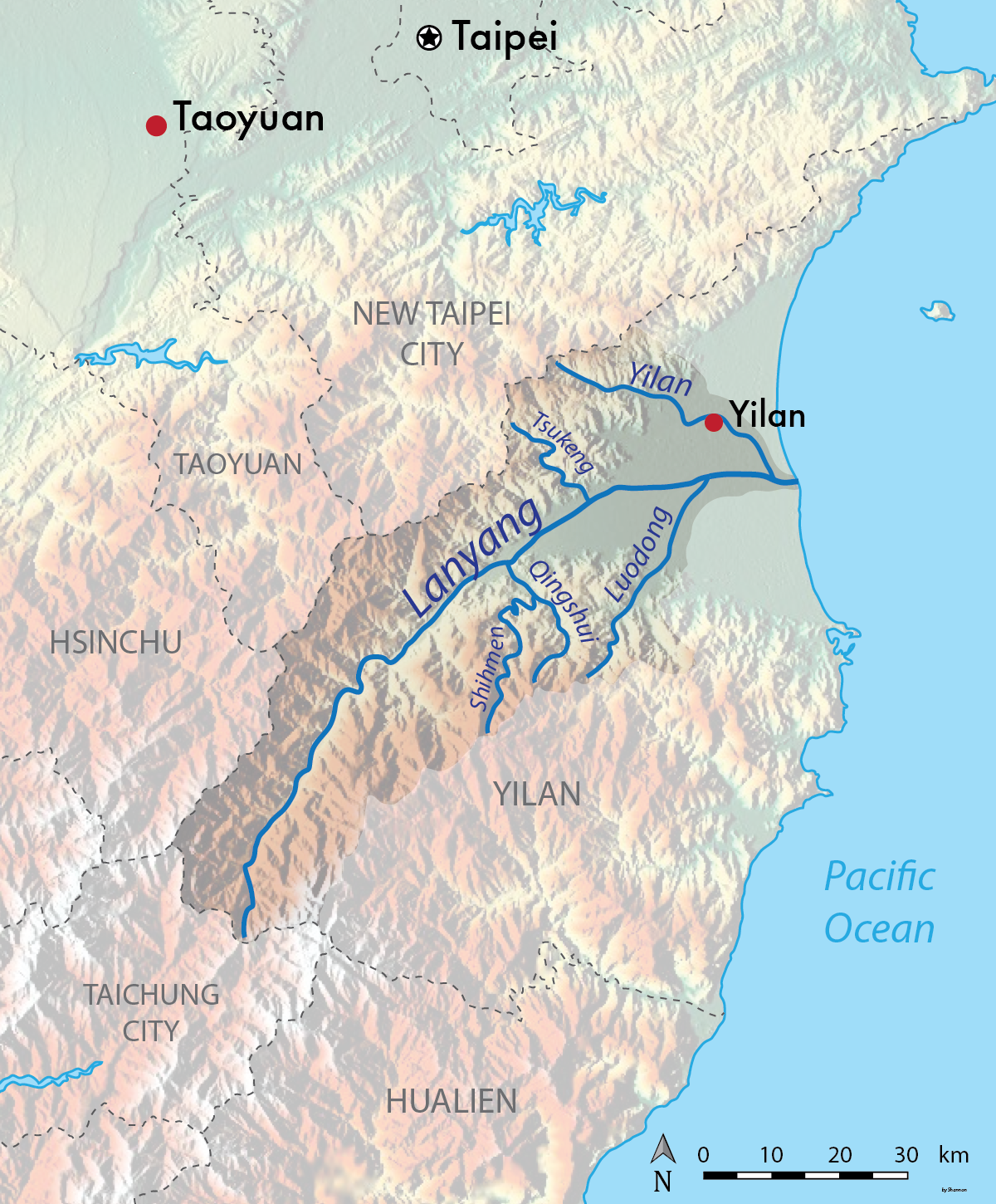
Map of the Lanyang River basin

== Fauna ==
Three turtle species occur in the Yilan River: the native Chinese stripe-necked turtle and yellow pond turtle, and the introduced red-eared slider, which outnumbers the native species. Glass eels of two eel species, Anguilla japonica and Anguilla marmorata, are found in the river.

== See also ==
- List of rivers in Taiwan
