= Beigang River =

River in Taiwan

Coordinates: 23°31′38″N 120°09′00″E

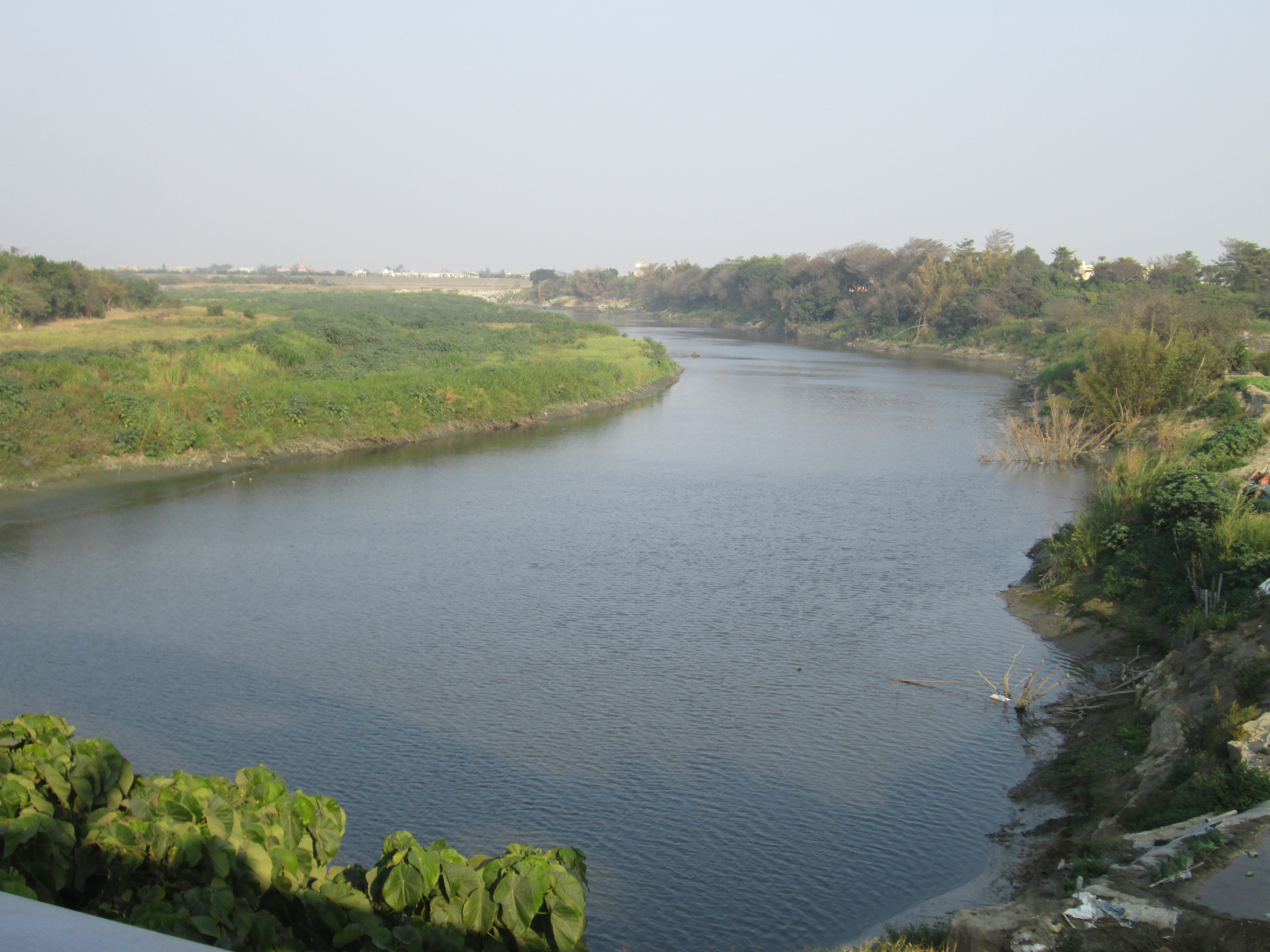

- Beigang River in Taiwan
- Native name: 北港溪 (Chinese)

Location
- Country: Taiwan
- County: Yunlin and Chiayi

Physical characteristics
- Source
  - location: Western slopes of the Alishan Range
  - elevation: 561 m (1,841 ft)
- Mouth
  - location: Pacific Ocean
  - elevation: 0 metres (0 ft)
- Length: 82 km (51 mi)
- Basin size: 645.21 km^{2} (249.12 sq mi)
- Discharge
  - maximum: 5,000 m^{3}/s (180,000 cu ft/s)

Basin features
- Tributaries
  - left: Huwei River * Tahukou River
  - right: Sandie River

Beigang River
- Chinese: 北港溪
- Literal meaning: North Port Creek
Transcriptions
Standard Mandarin
- Hanyu Pinyin: Běigǎng Xī
- Wade–Giles: Pei-kang Hsi

The Beigang River, formerly known as the Pakan from its Hokkien pronunciation, is a river in Taiwan named for Beigang, a port 20 kilometres from its mouth. It flows through Yunlin and Chiayi counties for 82 km.

At the river mouth lies the Aogu Wetland at Dongshi Township of Chiayi County.

Beigang River is moderately polluted.

== Bridges ==
- Beigang Tourist Bridge

== See also ==
- List of rivers in Taiwan
