= Tahukou River =

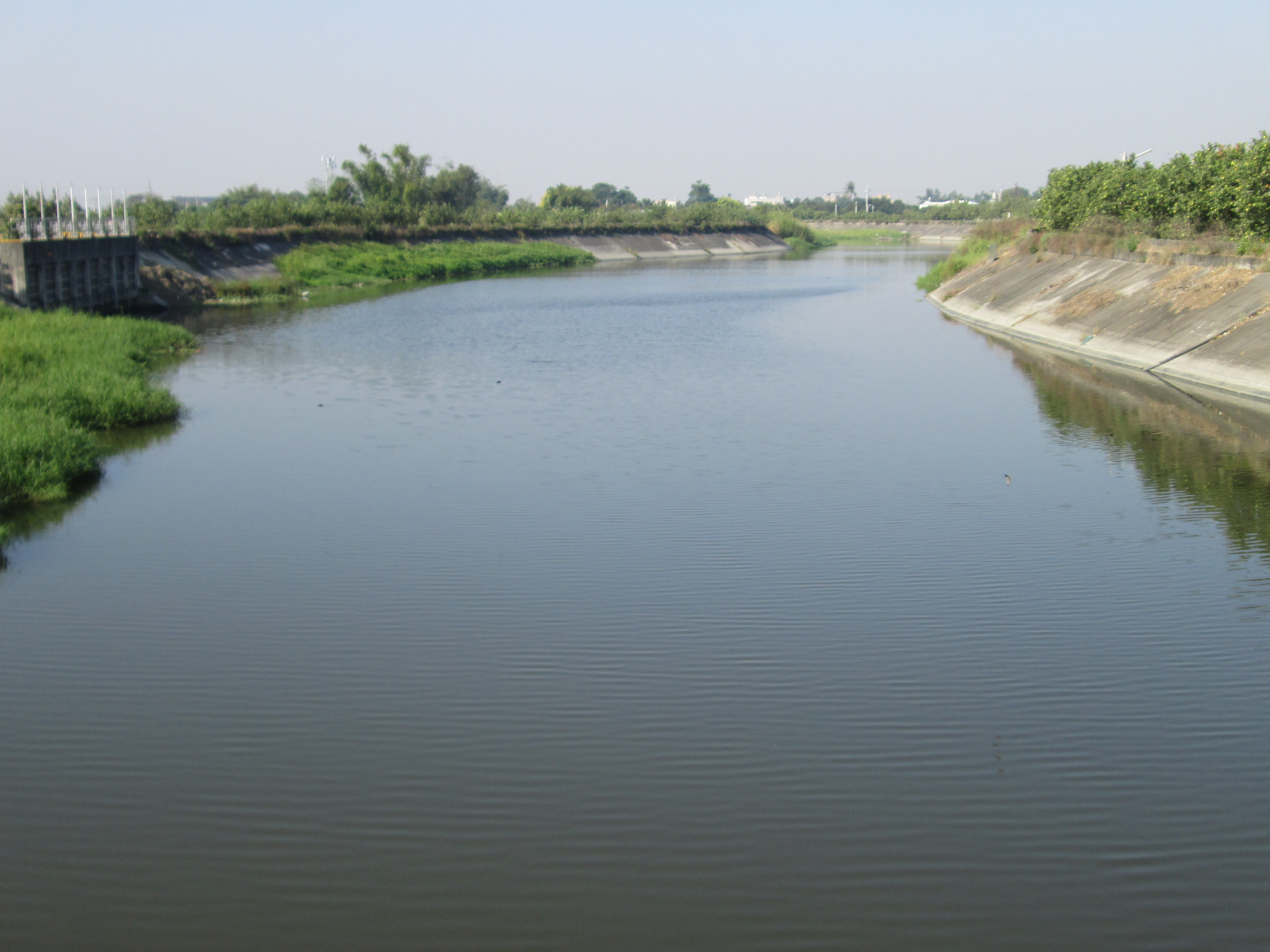

- Tahukou River at its confluence with Huwei River
- Native name: 大湖口溪 (Chinese)

Location
- Country: Taiwan
- County: Yunlin

Physical characteristics
- Mouth
  - coordinates: 23.678°N 120.419°E

Basin features
- River system: Beigang River

The Tahukou River (Chinese: 大湖口溪; pinyin: Dàhúkǒu Xī) is a river in Yunlin County, Taiwan. It is a tributary of Huwei River, which itself is a tributary Beigang River.

== See also ==
- List of rivers in Taiwan
