= Hualian River =

Hualien River
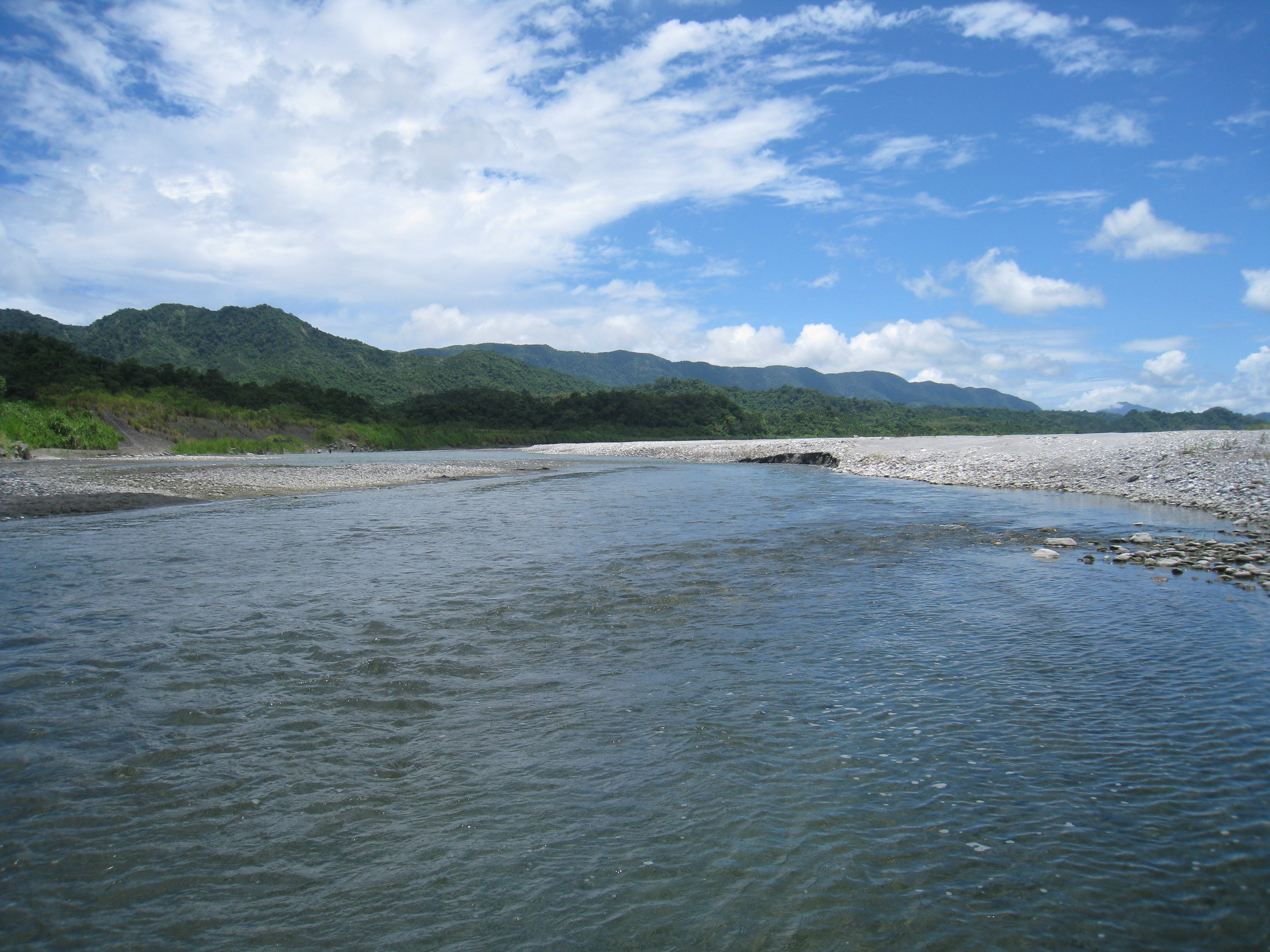
- Hualien River

- Hualien River in Taiwan
- Native name: 花蓮溪

Location
- Country: Taiwan

Physical characteristics
- Source
  - location: Central Mountain Range: Bazi Mountain (拔子山; offshoot of the Dan Mountain)
  - coordinates: 23.615119°N 121.329490°E
- Mouth
  - location: Pacific Ocean: Ji'an, Hualien
- Length: 57.28 km (35.59 mi)
- Basin size: 1,507.09 km^{2} (581.89 sq mi)

Basin features
- Tributaries
  - left: Wanli River; Shoufeng River; Mugua River
- Tributaries: Ma'an River; Guangfu River

The Hualian River, also spelled Hualien River, (Chinese: 花蓮溪; pinyin: Huālián Xī; Wade–Giles: Hua^{1}-lien^{2} Hsi^{1}; Pe̍h-ōe-jī: Hoa-liân-khe/Hoa-lian-khe) is a river in Taiwan. It flows through Hualien County for 57 kilometres (35 mi). The Hai'an Range starts at the mouth of the river.

== Tributaries ==
There are five major tributaries, listed here from mouth to source:

- Mugua River: Hualien County (42 km)
- Shoufeng River: Hualien County (37 km)
- Wanli River: Hualien County (53 km)
- Ma'an River: Hualien County (39 km)
- Guangfu River: Hualien County (15 km)

== See also ==
- List of rivers in Taiwan
