= Sandie River =

River in Chiayi County, Taiwan

- Sandie River in Taiwan
- Native name: 三疊溪 (Chinese)

Location
- Country: Taiwan
- County: Chiayi

Basin features
- River system: Beigang River

The Sandie River (Chinese: 三疊溪; pinyin: Sāndié Xī; Wade–Giles: San^{1}-tieh^{2} Hsi^{1}) is a tributary of Beigang River in Chiayi County, Taiwan.

== See also ==
- List of rivers in Taiwan
