= Gueichong River =

- Gueichong River in Taiwan
- Native name: 龜重溪 (Chinese)

Location
- Country: Taiwan

Physical characteristics
- Mouth
  - location: Jishui River
  - coordinates: 23.306°N 120.33°E
- Length: 35 km (22 mi)

The Gueichong River (Chinese: 龜重溪; Hanyu Pinyin: Guīchòng Xī; Tongyong Pinyin: Gueichòng Si; Wade–Giles: Kui^{1}-ch'ong^{4} Hsi^{1}) is a river in Taiwan. It flows through Tainan City for 35 km, before joining Jishui River.

== See also ==
- List of rivers in Taiwan
