= Heping River =

River in Taiwan

Coordinates: 24°21′52.6″N 121°37′15.9″E

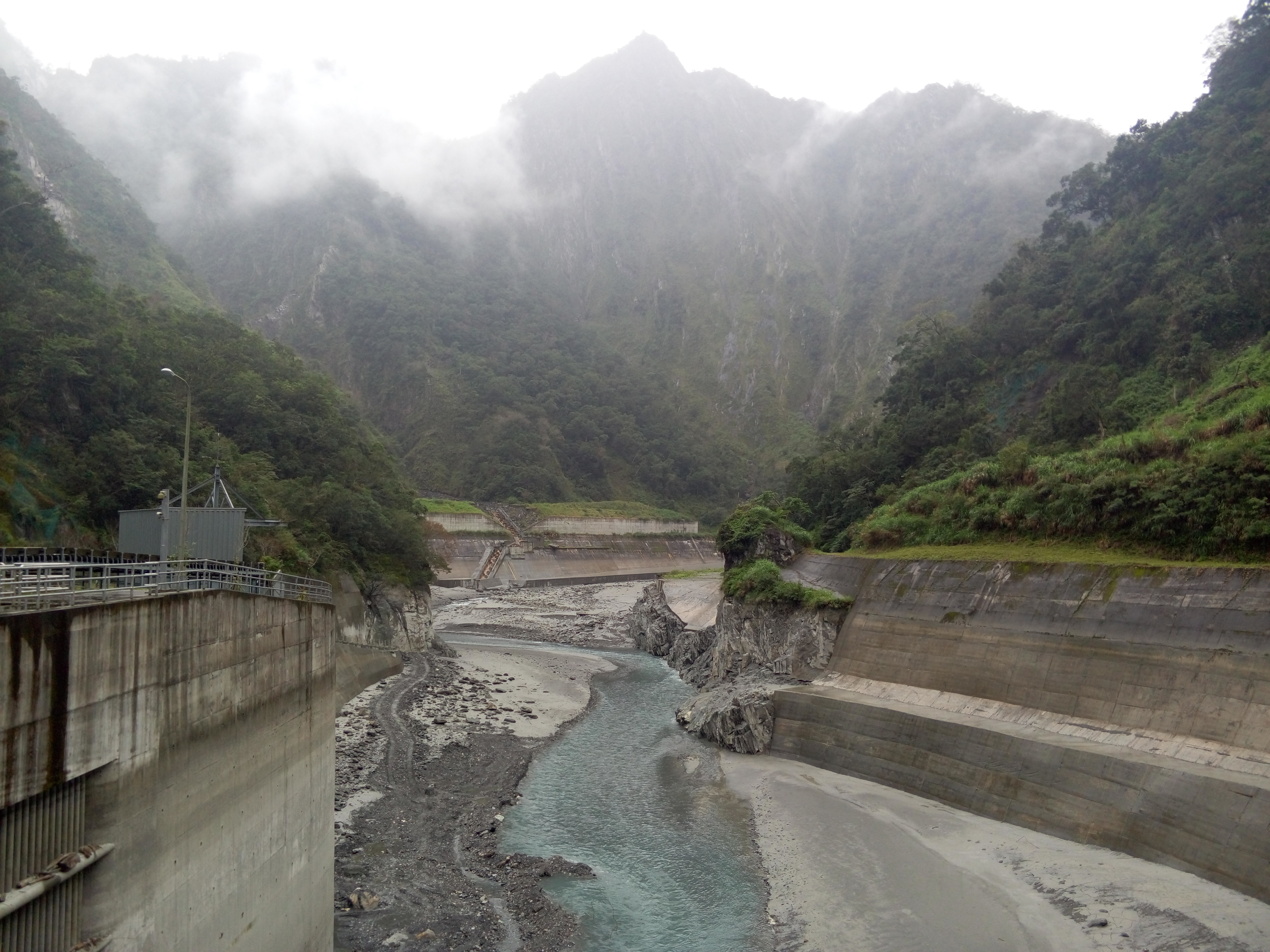
- Native name: 和平溪 (Chinese)

Location
- Location: Taiwan

Physical characteristics
- Mouth: Pacific Ocean
- Length: 50.7 km (31.5 mi)
- Basin size: 561 km^{2}
- Discharge
  - maximum: 7,900 m^{3}/s

The Heping River (Chinese: 和平溪; pinyin: Hépíng Xī) is a river in Taiwan.

== Geology ==
The river spans over a length of 50.7 km with maximum discharge level 7.900 m^{3}/s.

== See also ==
- List of rivers of Taiwan
