= Dianbao River =

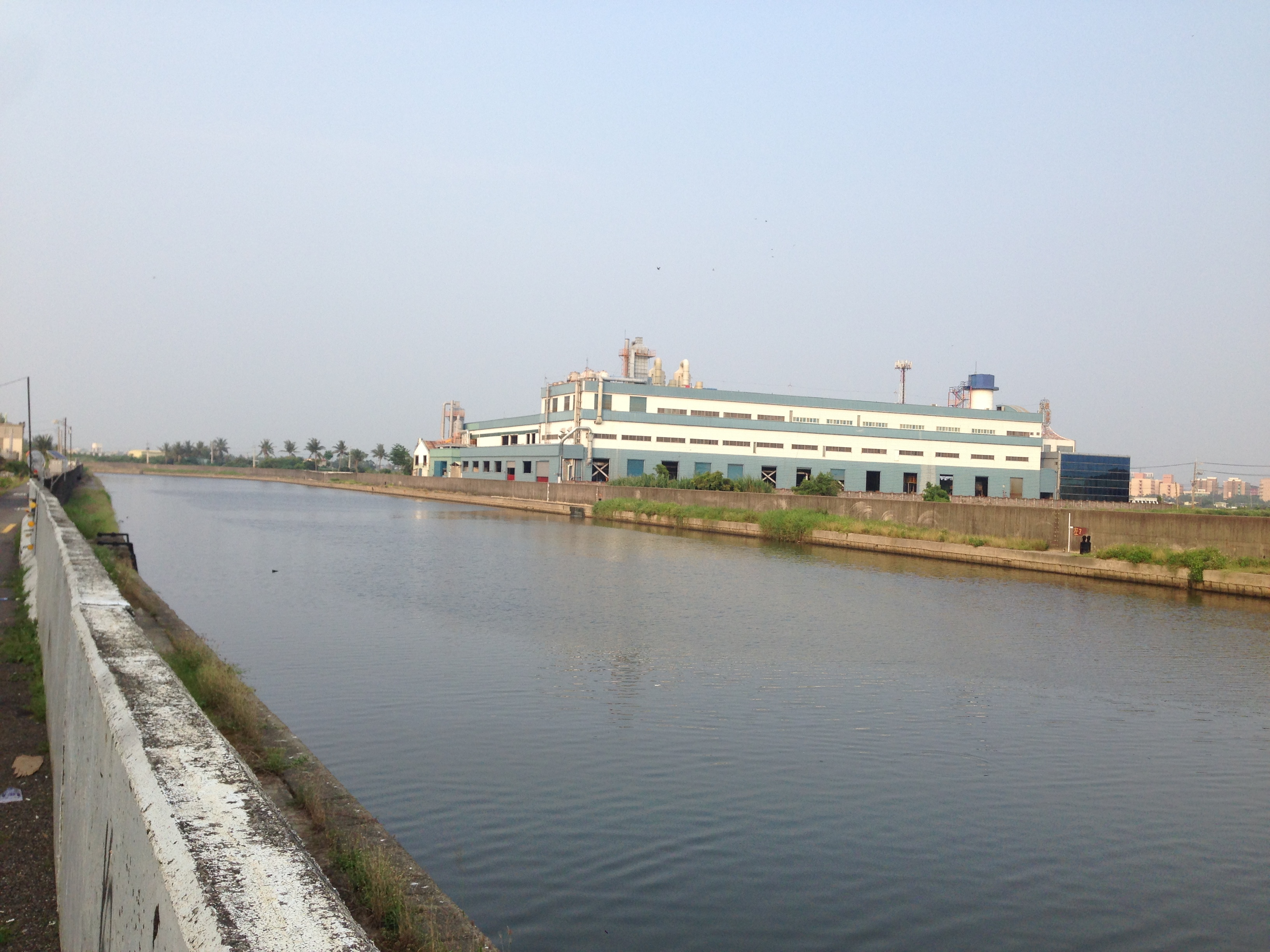

- Map showing the mouth of the Dianbao River

Location
- Country: Taiwan

Physical characteristics
- Mouth
  - location: Taiwan Strait: Nanzi District/Ziguan District, Kaohsiung City
  - coordinates: 22.7181°N 120.2547°E
- Length: 32 km (20 mi)
- Basin size: 106 km^{2} (41 sq mi)

The Dianbao River (Chinese: 典寶溪; pinyin: Diǎnbǎo Xī; Wade–Giles: Tien^{3}-pao^{3} Hsi^{1}) is a river in Taiwan. It flows through Kaohsiung City for 32 km.

== See also ==
- List of rivers in Taiwan
