= Shoufeng River =

River in Taiwan

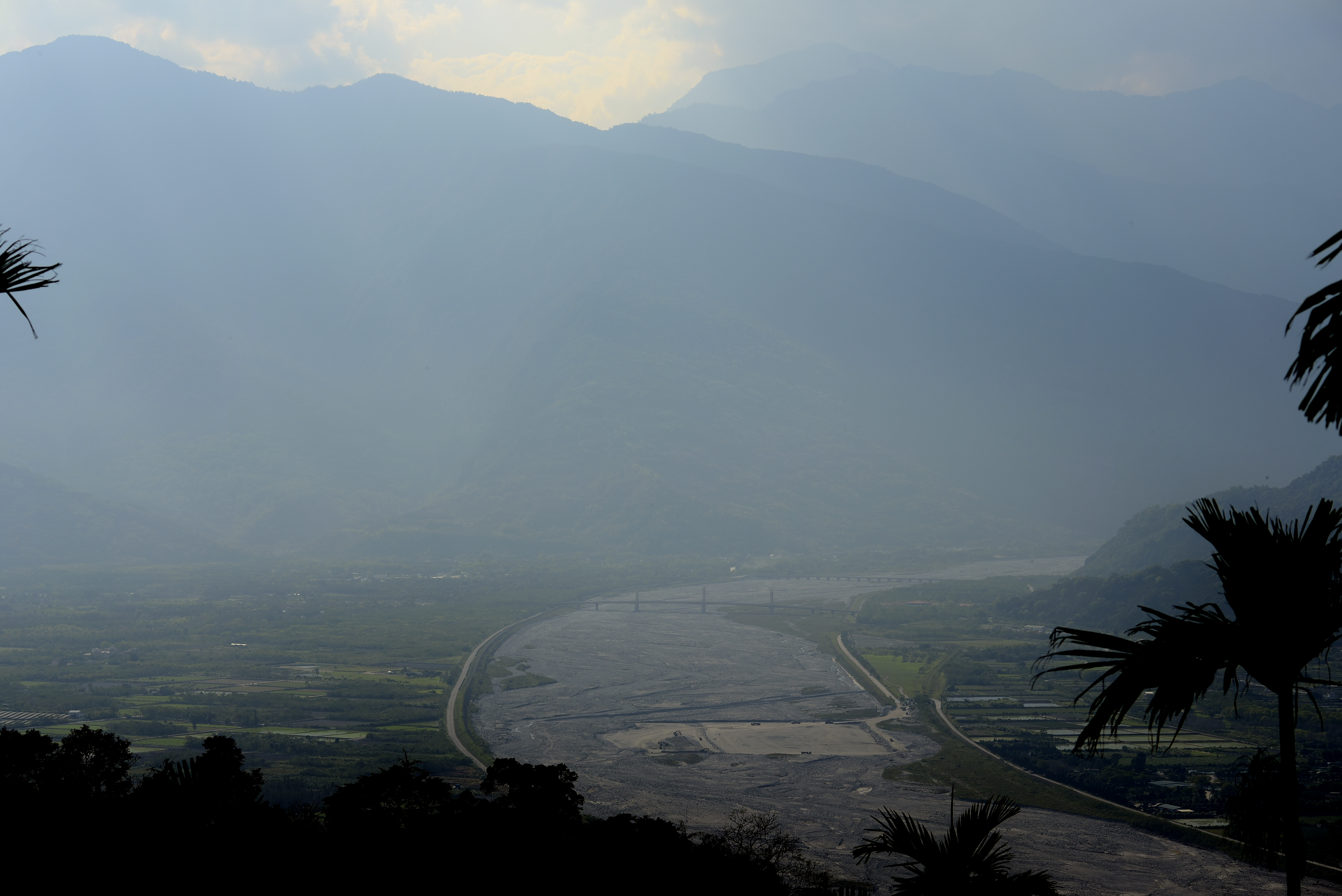

- Shoufeng River in Taiwan
- Native name: 壽豐溪 (Chinese)

Location
- Country: Taiwan

Physical characteristics
- Source
  - location: Central Mountain Range
- Mouth
  - location: Hualien River
  - coordinates: 23.821°N 121.525°E
- Length: 36.54 km (22.70 mi)
- Basin size: 275.92 km^{2} (106.53 mi^{2})
- Discharge
  - maximum: 2,920 m^{3}/s (103,000 cu ft/s)

Basin features
- River system: Hualien River basin

The Shoufeng River, also spelled Shoufong River, (Chinese: 壽豐溪; Hanyu Pinyin: Shòufēng Xī; Tongyong Pinyin: Shòufong Si) is a tributary of the Hualien River in Taiwan. It flows through Hualien County for 37 km before joining the Hualien River in Shoufeng, Hualien.

== See also ==
- List of rivers in Taiwan
