= Fanziliao River =

River in Miaoli County, Taiwan

- Fanziliao River

Location
- Country: Taiwan

Physical characteristics
- Mouth
  - location: Taiwan Strait: Tongxiao, Miaoli
  - coordinates: 24.477°N 120.662°E

The Fanziliao River (Chinese: 番仔寮溪) is a small river in Miaoli County, Taiwan.

== See also ==
- List of rivers in Taiwan
