= Jishui River =

River in Tainan, Taiwan

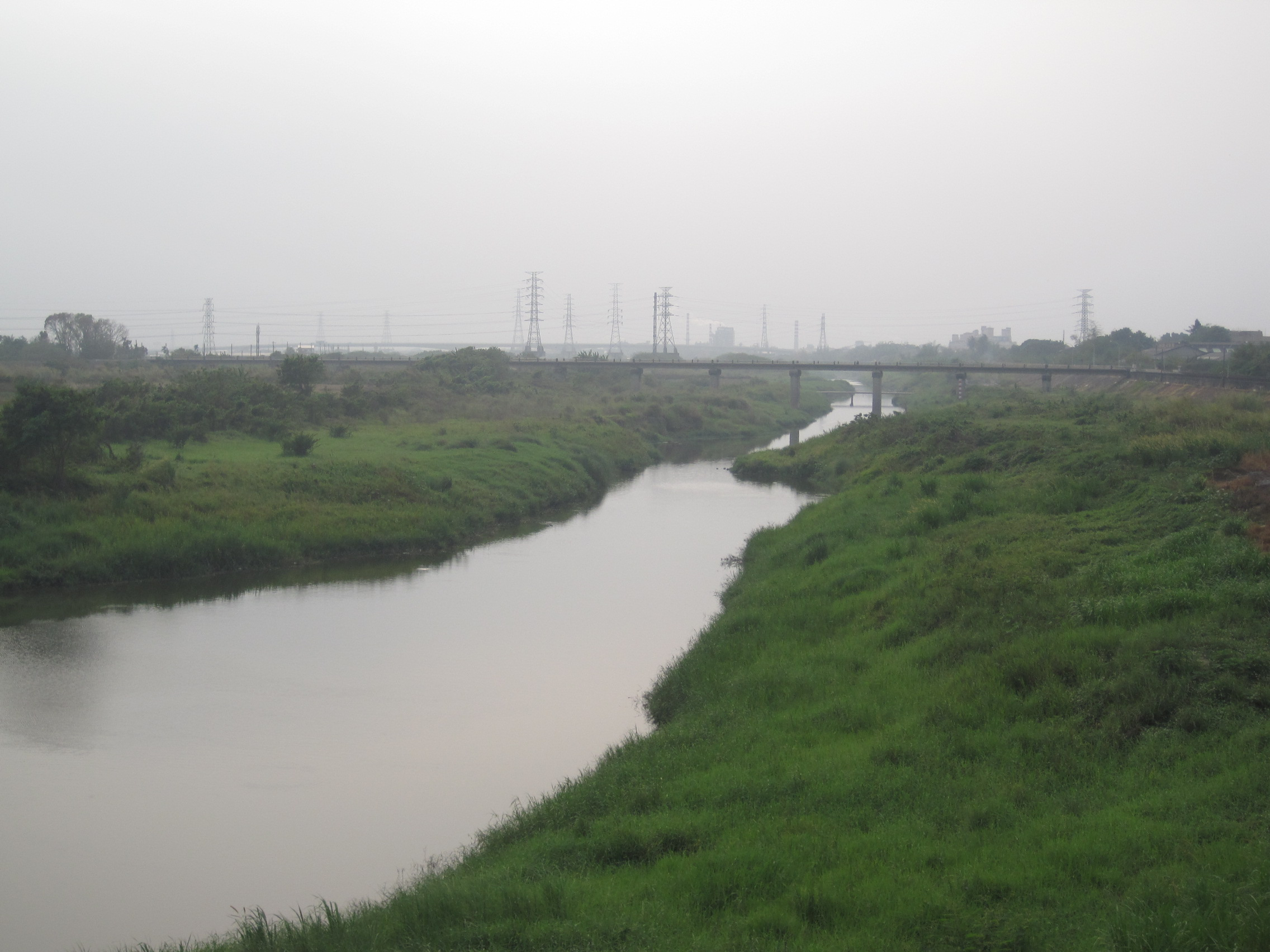

- Jishui River in Taiwan
- Native name: 急水溪 (Chinese)

Location
- Country: Taiwan

Physical characteristics
- Source
  - location: Jianshi, Hsinchu: 結山
  - elevation: 1,320 m (4,330 ft)
- Mouth
  - location: Taiwan Strait: Hsinchu County
  - coordinates: 23.298°N 120.105°E
- Length: 65 km (40 mi)
- Basin size: 379 km^{2} (146 sq mi)

Basin features
- Tributaries
  - left: Gueichong River
- Other tributaries: Baishuei River, Liuzhong River

The Jishui River (Chinese: 急水溪; Hanyu Pinyin: Jíshuǐ Xī; Tongyong Pinyin: Jíshuěi Si; Wade–Giles: Chi^{2}-shui^{3} Hsi^{1}) is a river in Taiwan. The 65 km river flows through Tainan City.

== See also ==
- List of rivers in Taiwan
