= Puzi River =

Puzi River 朴子溪
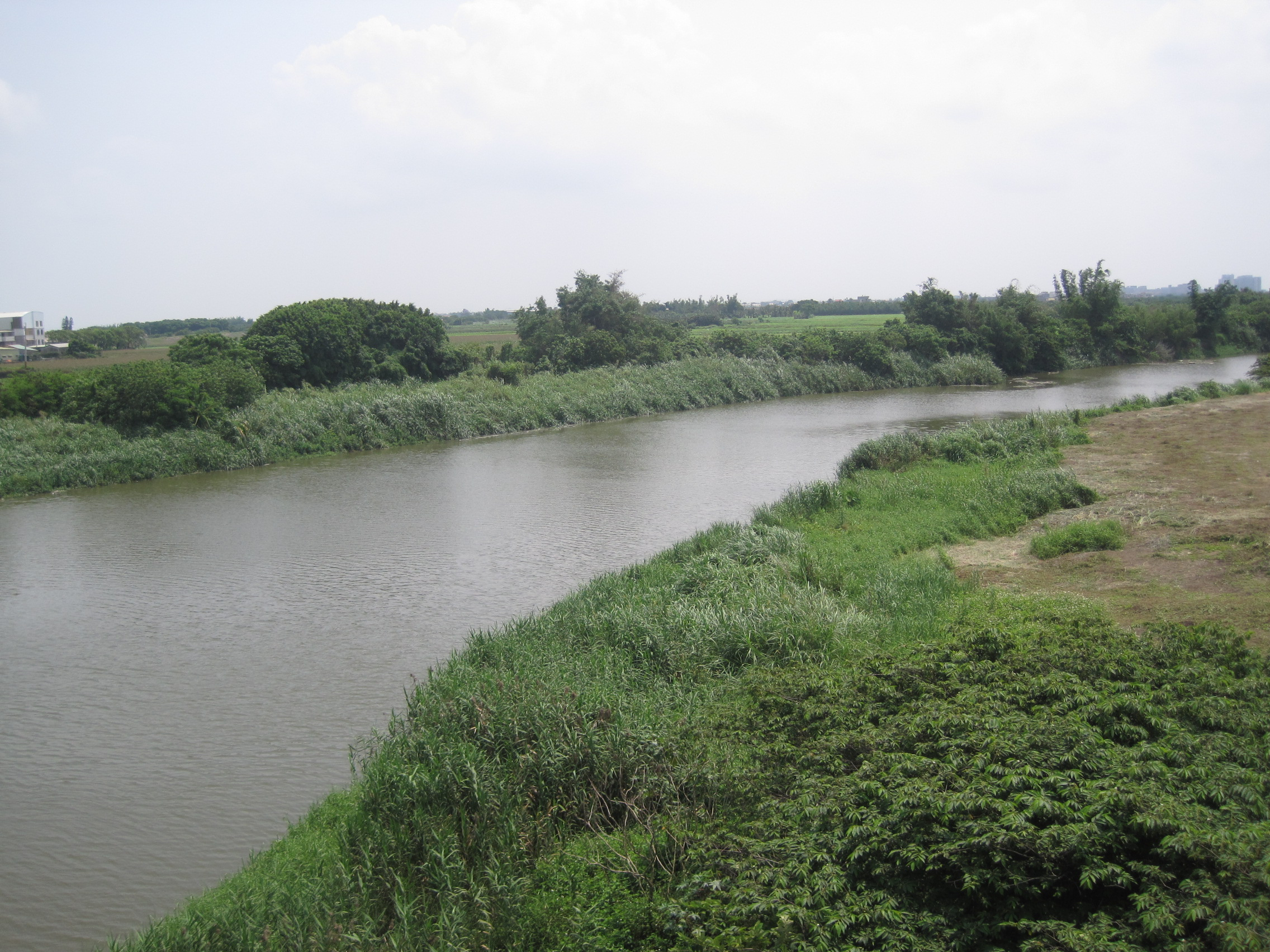

Location
- Location: Chiayi County, Taiwan

Physical characteristics
- Source: Alishan Range
  - elevation: 1,421 metres (4,662 ft)
- Mouth: Taiwan Strait
  - location: Dongshi Township, Chiayi
  - coordinates: 23.4462°N 120.1441°E
  - elevation: 0 m (0 ft)
- Length: 75.87 km (47.14 mi)
- Basin size: 426.6 km^{2} (164.7 sq mi)
- Discharge
  - average: 16 m^{3}/s (570 cu ft/s)

The Puzi River (Chinese: 朴子溪; Hanyu Pinyin: Pǔzi Xī; Tongyong Pinyin: Pǔzih Si; Wade–Giles: P'u^{3}-tzu^{5} Hsi^{1}; Pe̍h-ōe-jī: Phò-chú-khe) is a river in Taiwan. It flows through Chiayi County for 75 km.

== See also ==
- List of rivers in Taiwan
