= Wanda River =

River in Taiwan

The Wanda River, also transliterated Wanta River (Chinese: 萬大溪; pinyin: Wàndà Xī; Wade–Giles: Wan^{4}-ta^{4} Hsi^{1}) is a river in Taiwan. It flows through Taichung for 37 km.

== See also ==
- List of rivers in Taiwan
