= Wenshui River =

River in Miaoli County, Taiwan

Coordinates: 24°27′28″N 120°52′29″E

Wenshui River（Traditional Chinese：汶水溪）, located in Miaoli County, Taiwan, is a central government-managed river and the upper stream of the main stream of the Houlong River. Its basin spans Tai'an Township, Shitan Township, and Dahu Township.

The river originates in the southwestern valley of Luchang Dashan at an altitude of 2,618 meters in Meiyuan Village, Tai'an Township. It initially flows southwest, then, after converging with the Dongxishui River, a tributary originating from Dongxishui Mountain, it turns west. It flows through Shangdao, Hushan, and Baguali, then turns southwest at the Bagua'kou area, forming a semi-circular arc opening to the north as it flows through Qing'an (the location of the Tai'an Township Office) and Paoshi. After converging with the Dahu River from the south at Wenshui, it is renamed the Houlong River.
