= Wanli River =

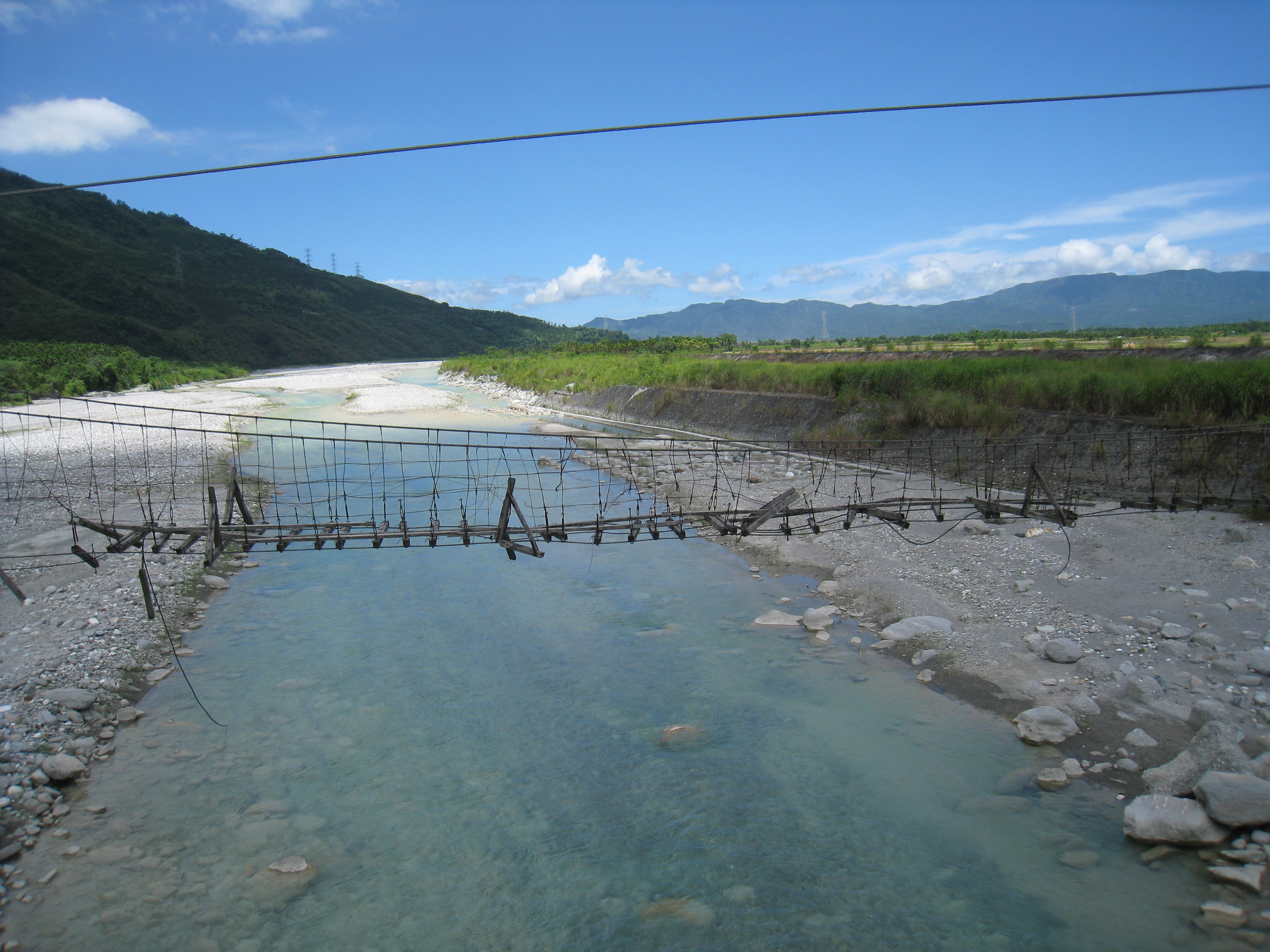

- Wanli River in Taiwan
- Native name: 萬里溪 (Chinese)

Location
- Country: Taiwan

Physical characteristics
- Source
  - location: Central Mountain Range
- Mouth
  - location: Hualien River
  - coordinates: 23.725°N 121.489°E
- Length: 53.31 km (33.13 mi)
- Basin size: 264.39 km^{2} (102.08 mi^{2})
- Discharge
  - maximum: 3,760 m^{3}/s (133,000 cu ft/s)

Basin features
- River system: Hualien River basin

The Wanli River (Chinese: 萬里溪; pinyin: Wànlǐ Xī) is a tributary of the Hualien River in Taiwan. It flows through Hualien County for 53 kilometres (33 mi) before joining the Hualien River in Fenglin, Hualien.

== See also ==
- List of rivers in Taiwan
