= Touqian River =

Coordinates: 24.8519°N 120.9300°E

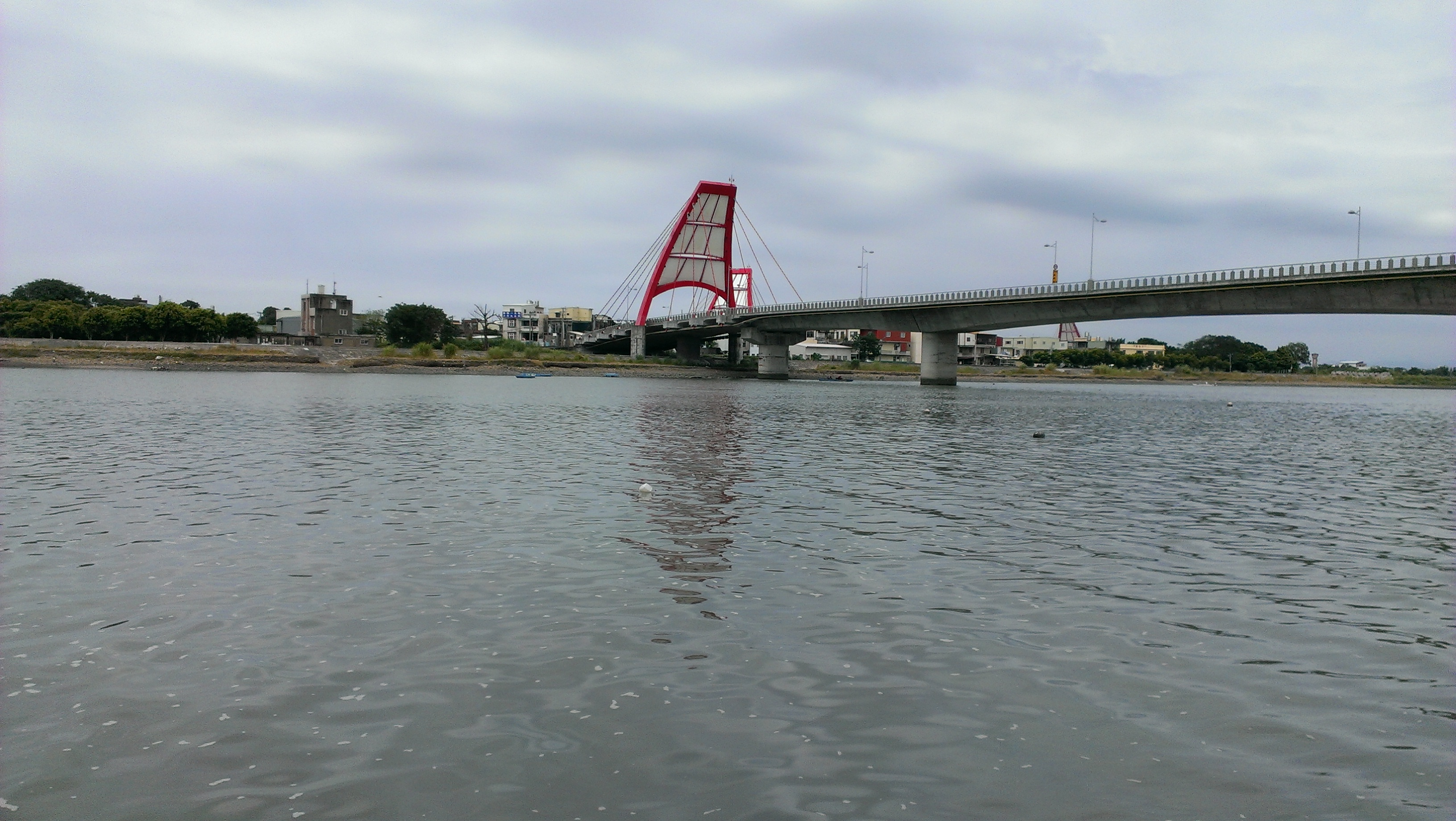
- Bridge near the river mouth

- Touqian River in Taiwan
- Native name: 頭前溪 (Chinese)

Location
- Country: Taiwan

Physical characteristics
- Source
  - location: Xueshan Range: 鹿場大山
  - elevation: 2,616 m (8,583 ft)
- Mouth
  - location: Taiwan Strait: Hsinchu County
- Length: 63.03 km (39.17 mi)
- Basin size: 565.94 km^{2} (218.51 sq mi)

The Touqian River (Chinese: 頭前溪; Hanyu Pinyin: Tóuqián Xī; Tongyong Pinyin: Tóucián Si; Wade–Giles: T'ou^{2}-ch'ien^{2} Hsi^{1}) is a river in northern Taiwan. It flows through Hsinchu County for 63 km (39 mi).

The tofu rocks are located on a section of the Touqian before it passes through Hsinchu City. They were placed as water breakers to slow the river to mitigate soil erosion of the riverbed.

== See also ==
- List of rivers in Taiwan
