= Jialishan Range =

Mountain range in Taiwan

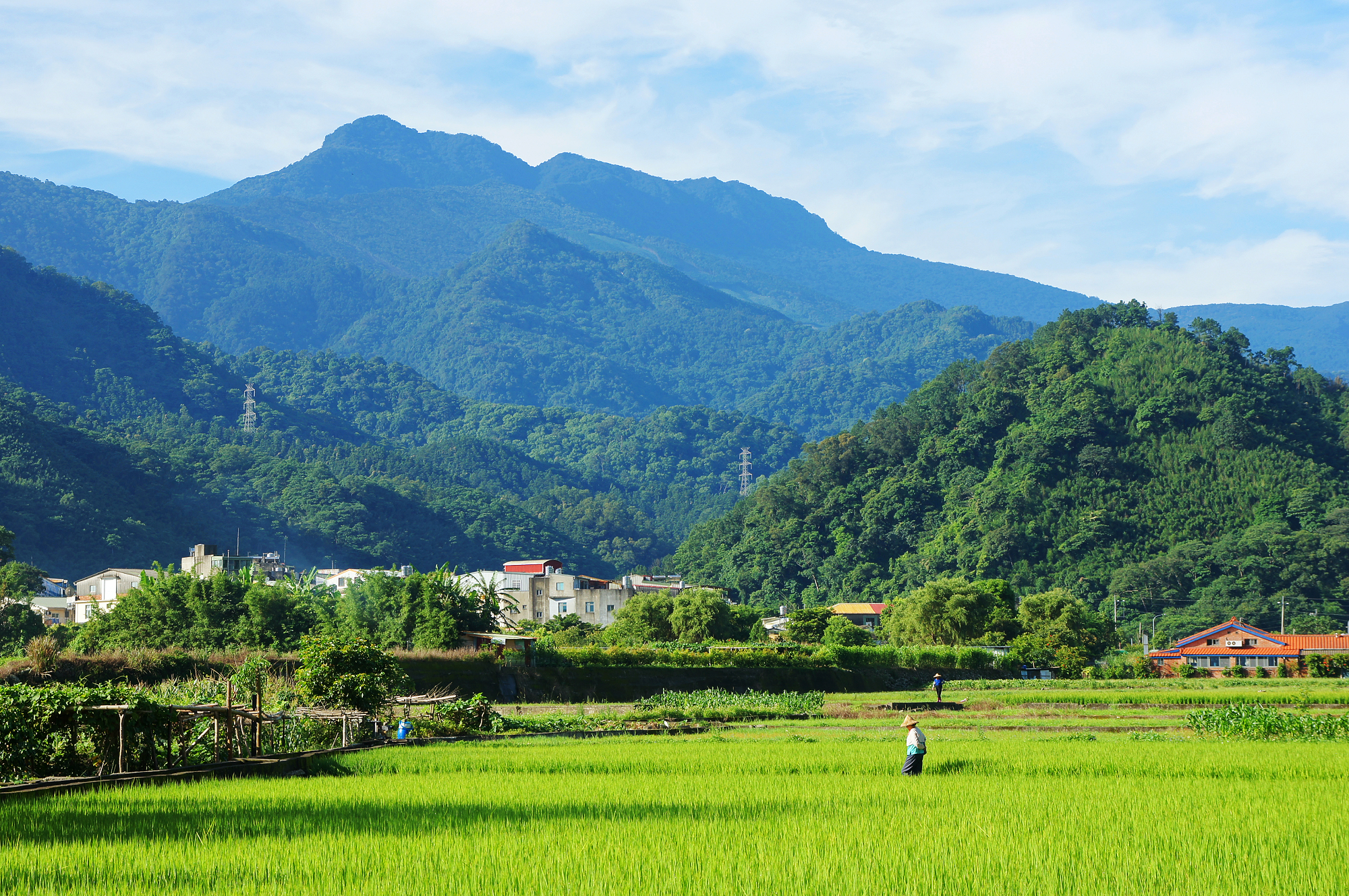
- The mountain which has a height of 2,220 m., also known as Mt. Jiali or Jiali Shan, in Miaoli County

Highest point
- Peak: Mount Le (Chinese: 樂山; pinyin: Lèshān)
- Elevation: 2,618 m (8,589 ft)
- Coordinates: 24°29′55″N 121°04′13″E

Naming
- Native name: 加里山山脈 (Chinese)

Geography
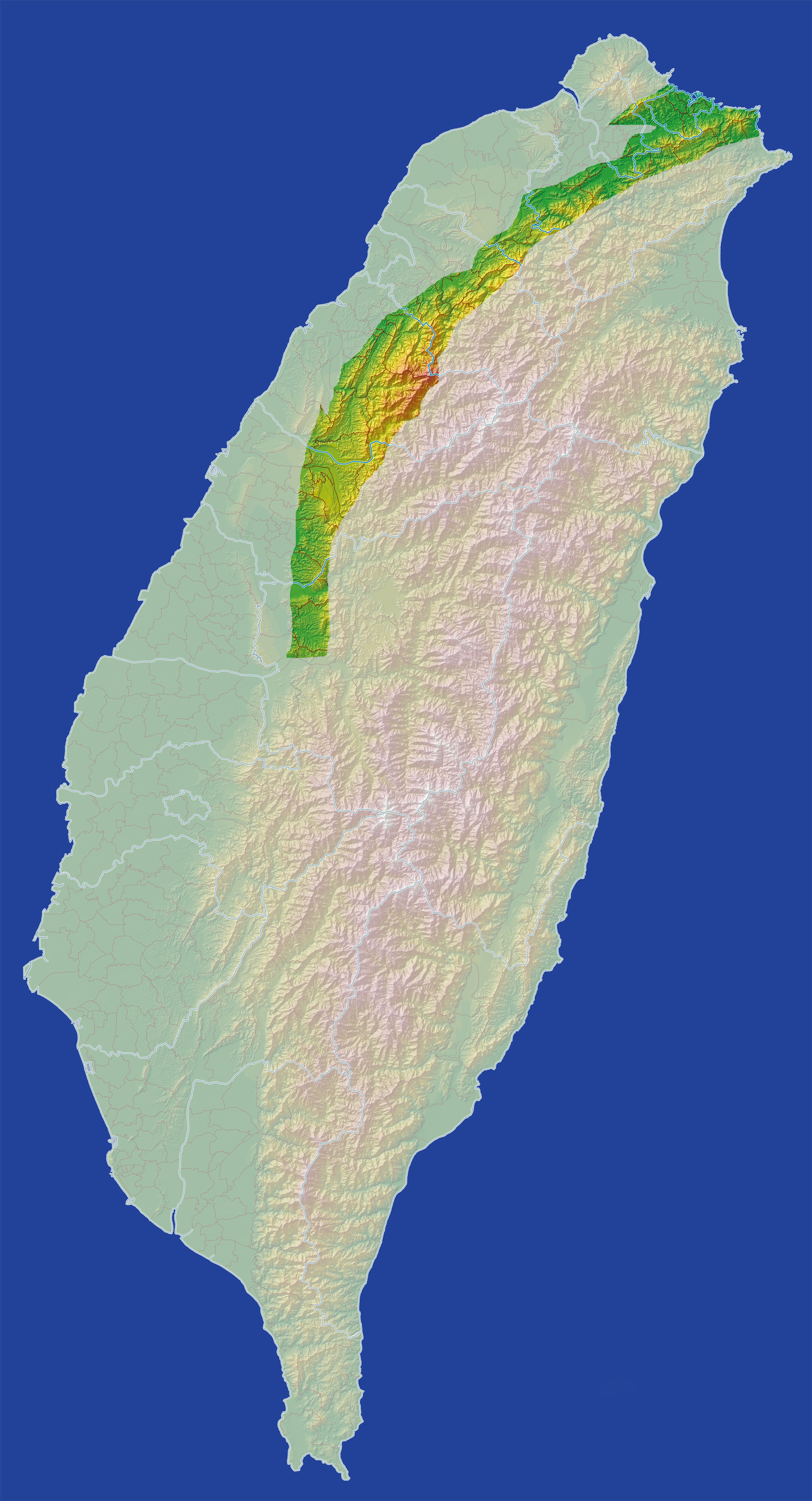
- The location of Jialishan Range.
- Location: Republic of China

Geology
- Mountain type: Mountain range

Jialishan Range (Chinese: 加里山山脈; pinyin: Jiālǐshān Shānmài) is a mountain range in northern Taiwan. It is also regarded as the northern part of "Western Thrust Fault Mountains" (西部衝上斷層山地) by Tomita Yoshirou and Lin Chaoqi.

Although it is named as "Range", some scholars think it only is a piedmont belt. It does not find a mention in the geography textbooks of elementary schools and high schools. The reason is Jialishan Range was cut by several rivers.

The tallest peak of Jialishan Range is Mount Le (樂山), which has a height of 2,618 m.

== Location ==
Jialishan Range faces the Xueshan Range on the east and Alishan Range on the south.

== Including ==
- Shen'ao Mountains
- Sandiouling Mountains
- Nangang Range
- Fushishan Range
- Wuzhishan Range
- Dajianshan Range
- Wanli Mountains
- Shanzijiou Block
- Qingshukeng Block
- Daxi Mountains
- Xiongkongshan Range
- Youloushan Range
- Leshan Range
- Shitoushan Mointains
- Baguali Range
- Malabang Range
- Bajioudong Range
- Guandaoshan Range
- Dahu Hills
- Dongshi Hills
- Fengyuan Hills
- Chuyunshan Range
- Dahengpingshan Range
- Nantou Hills
- Jijidashan Range
