= Wanda =

- Pronunciation: /ˈwɒndə/ Polish: [ˈvanda]
- Gender: Female
- Language: Polish

Origin
- Region of origin: Poland

Other names
- Nickname: Wan
- Related names: Wendy

Wanda is a female given name of Polish origin. It probably derives from the tribal name of the Wends. The name has long been popular in Poland where the legend of Princess Wanda has been circulating since at least the 12th century. In 1947, Wanda was cited as the second most popular name, after Maria, for Polish girls, and the most popular from Polish secular history. The name was made familiar in the English-speaking world by the 1883 novel Wanda, written by Ouida, the story line of which is based on the last years of the Hechingen branch of the Swabian House of Hohenzollern. In the United States, Wanda attained its highest popularity in the year 1934, peaking then at No. 47 on the list of names most frequently given to female infants. The name is popularly misinterpreted as meaning "wanderer."

== Namesakes ==
- Wanda Barfield, American pediatrician
- Wanda Barzee (born 1945), American criminal convicted of the kidnapping of Elizabeth Smart
- Wanda Coleman (1946–2013), American poet
- Wanda Cowley (1924–2017), New Zealand children's writer
- Wanda Ford, American former basketball player
- Wanda Hazel Gág (1893–1946), American author and illustrator of the children's book Millions of Cats
- Wanda Gertz (1896–1958)
- Wanda Gołkowska (1925–2013), Polish artist
- Wanda Guenette (born 1962), Canadian volleyball player
- Wanda Hatfield, Cherokee politician
- Wanda Hawley (1895–1963), American silent film-era actress
- Wanda Hendrix (1928–1981), American film actress
- Wanda Hutchinson (born 1951), American R&B singer (the Emotions)
- Wanda Jackson (born 1937), American rockabilly singer
- Wanda Jakubowska (1907–1998)
- Maria Wanda Jastrzębska (1924–1988), Polish electronics engineer and academic
- Wanda John-Kehewin, Cree-Métis author and poet
- Wanda Józefa Maria Kirchmayer (1901–1944), Polish engineer and resistance fighter
- Wanda Klaff (1922–1946), German Nazi concentration camp overseer executed for war crimes
- Wanda Kosakiewicz (1917–1989), French stage actress and love interest of both Jean-Paul Sartre and Albert Camus. Sartre dedicated his The Roads to Freedom trilogy to her.
- Wanda Krahelska-Filipowicz (1886–1968), World War II anti-Nazi Polish leader
- Wanda Lyzwinska (born 1953)
- Wanda Landowska (1877–1959)
- Wanda Malecka (1800–1860)
- Wanda Panfil (born 1959)
- Wanda Perdelwitz (1984–2025), German actress
- Wanda Piłsudska (1918–2001)
- Wanda Rewieńska (1897–1942), Polish geographer, executed by Nazi occupying forces
- Wanda Rijo (born 1979), Dominican Republic weightlifter
- Wanda Rutkiewicz (1943–1992), Polish mountain climber
- Wanda dos Santos (1932–2025), Brazilian hurdler
- Wanda Soto Tolentino, Puerto Rican politician
- Wanda Stopa (1900–1924), Polish-American attorney and murderer
- Wanda Sykes (born 1962), American actress, comedian, and writer.
- Wanda Tinasky (pseudonym)
- Wanda Toscanini Horowitz (1907–1998)
- Wanda Vazquez Garced (born 1960), Governor of Puerto Rico
- Wanda Ventham (born 1935), English actress
- Wanda Warska (1930–2019), Polish jazz singer and composer
- Wanda Wasilewska (1905–1964)
- Wanda Wiley (1901–1987), American actress in silent films
- Wanda Wiłkomirska (1929–2018)
- Wanda Young (1943–2021), American R&B singer (the Marvelettes)

== Fictional characters ==
- Princess Wanda, legendary heroine in Polish folk mythology
- Wanda Firebaugh, character from the webcomic Erfworld (2007–continuing)
- Wanda Maximoff, alter-ego of the Avengers comic-book character Scarlet Witch (1964–continuing)
  - Wanda Maximoff, a film character based on Scarlet Witch.
- Wanda, protagonist of the 1970 movie of the same name, written, directed and starring Barbara Loden
- Wanda Seldon, key character in the 1993 novel Forward the Foundation, part of Isaac Asimov's Foundation series

== Music ==
- Wanda (band) an Austrian Indie pop band
- Kinda Fonda Wanda a song by Neil Young on his 1983 album Everybody's Rockin'
