= Dadu River (Taiwan) =

Coordinates: 24°10′11.5″N 120°31′05.7″E

Dadu River Wu River Black River
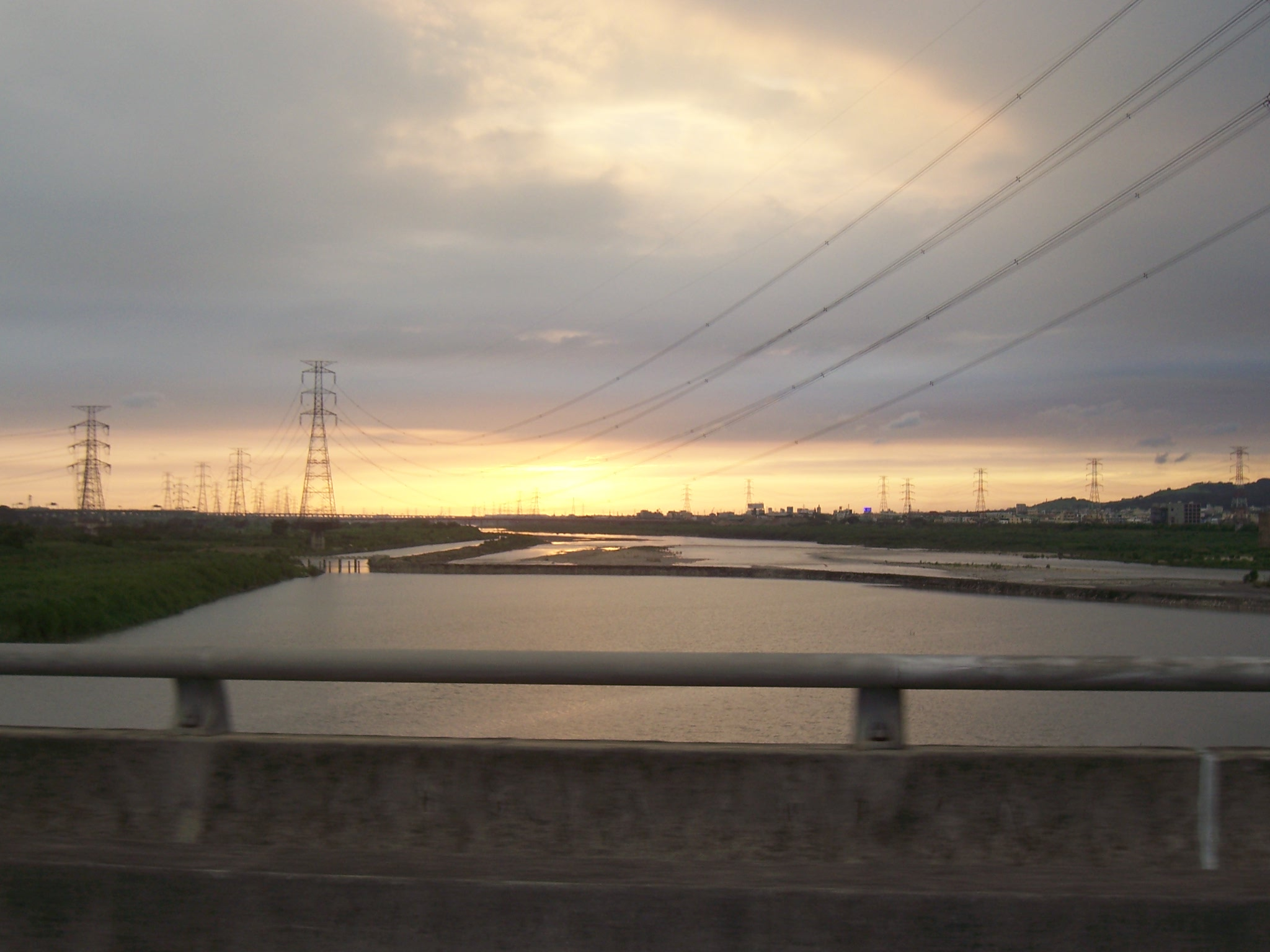
- Sunset at the lower reaches of Wu River

- Dadu River in Taiwan
- Native name: 大肚溪 (Chinese); 烏溪 (Chinese)

Location
- Country: Taiwan

Physical characteristics
- Source
  - location: Central Mountain Range: western foothills of Hehuanshan
- Mouth
  - location: Taiwan Strait: Taichung City/Changhua County border
- Length: 124 km (77 mi)
- Basin size: 2,025.6 km^{2} (782.1 sq mi)

Dadu River
- Chinese: 大肚溪
- Literal meaning: Big Belly Creek
Transcriptions
Standard Mandarin
- Hanyu Pinyin: Dàdù Xī
- Wade–Giles: Ta-tu Hsi

Black River
- Traditional Chinese: 烏溪
- Simplified Chinese: 乌溪
- Literal meaning: Black Creek; Raven Creek; Crow Creek
Transcriptions
Standard Mandarin
- Hanyu Pinyin: Wū Xī
- Wade–Giles: Wu Hsi
Southern Min
- Hokkien POJ: O͘ Khe

The Dadu River, also called the Wu River, is a major river in the Northwest of Taiwan. It is the sixth-longest river on the island with a total length of 124 km (77 mi).

== Names ==
The Dadu River is named after a former port near its mouth, now the Dadu District of Taichung.

It is also known as the Black River, a calque of its Hokkien name. The same name appears in English as the Wu River, the pinyin romanization of its Mandarin pronunciation. It received the name from the many black-winged birds that used to live along the river.

== Geography ==
It flows through Taichung City, Changhua County, and Nantou County for 119 kilometers (74 mi). It is the 6th-longest river on Taiwan Island and the 4th-largest in drainage area.

== See also ==
- List of rivers in Taiwan
