= Mugua River =

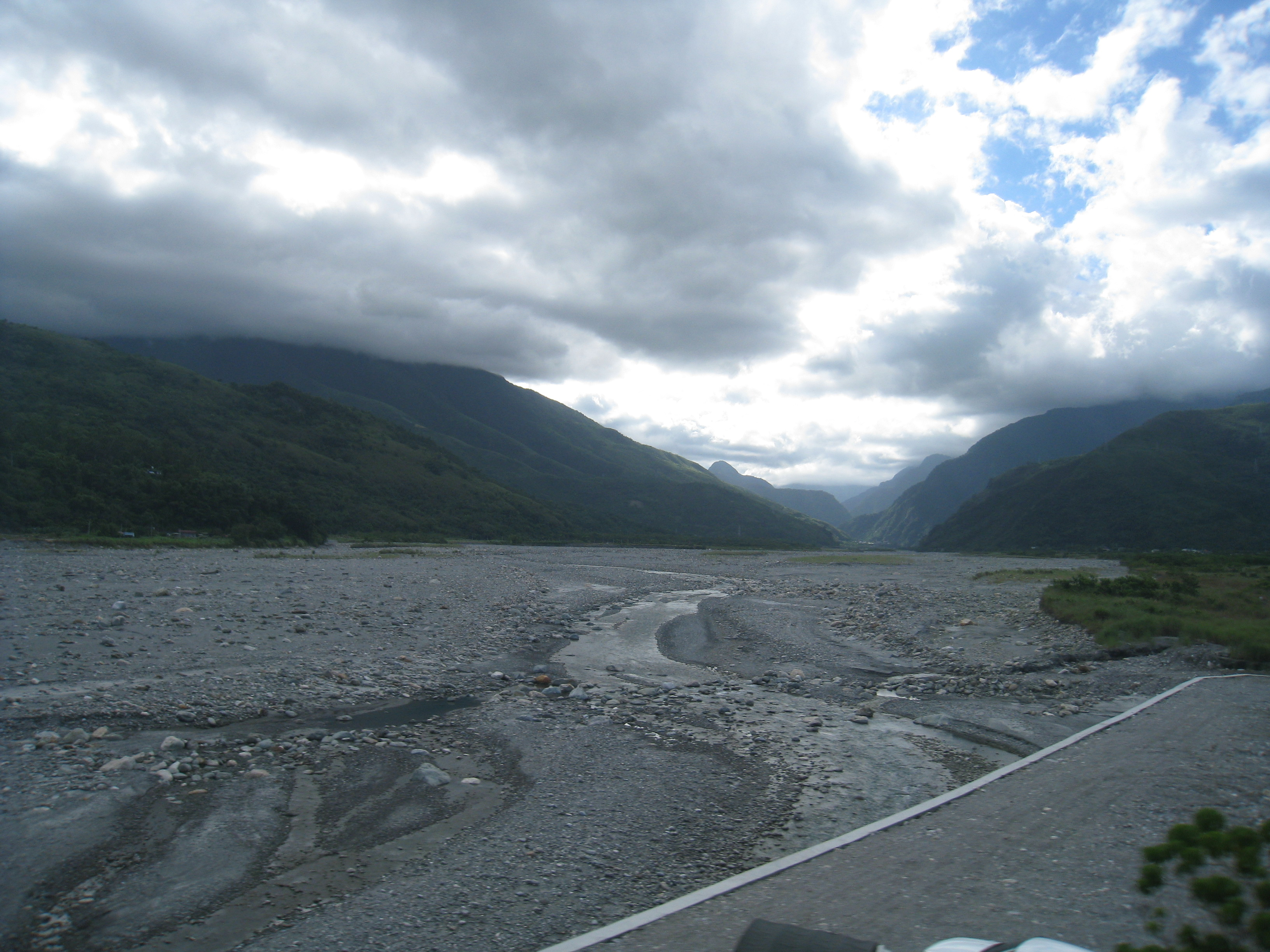
- Mugua River

- Mugua River in Taiwan
- Native name: 木瓜溪 (Chinese)

Location
- Country: Taiwan

Physical characteristics
- Source
  - location: Central Mountain Range
- Mouth
  - location: Hualien River
  - coordinates: 23.915°N 121.590°E
- Length: 41.78 km (25.96 mi)
- Basin size: 468.21 km^{2} (180.78 mi^{2})
- Discharge
  - maximum: 6,300 m^{3}/s (220,000 cu ft/s)

Basin features
- River system: Hualien River basin

The Mugua River, also spelled Mukua River, (Chinese: 木瓜溪; pinyin: Mùguā Xī; Wade–Giles: Mu^{4}-kua^{1} Hsi^{1}; Pe̍h-ōe-jī: Bo̍k-koe-khe; lit. 'Papaya River') is a tributary of the Hualien River in Taiwan. It flows through Hualien County for 42 km before joining the Hualien River in Ji'an, Hualien.

== See also ==
- List of rivers in Taiwan
