= Tongxiao (disambiguation) =

Tongxiao is an urban township in southern Miaoli County, Taiwan.

Tongxiao may also refer to:

- Tunghsiao Power Plant, a gas-fired power plant in Tongxiao Township, Miaoli County, Taiwan
- Tongxiao railway station, a railway station on the Taiwan Railways Administration West Coast line
- Tongxiao Shrine, a shrine in Tongxiao Township, Miaoli County, Taiwan
- Tongxiao Village (桐宵村), Tazhuang Township, Mishui, Hengdong County, Hunan Province, China
- Tanggyi Town (通宵镇; Tongxiao), Xinlong County, Sichuan Province, China
