= Flying Cow Ranch =

Ranch in Tongxiao, Miaoli County, Taiwan

Flying Cow Ranch 飛牛牧場
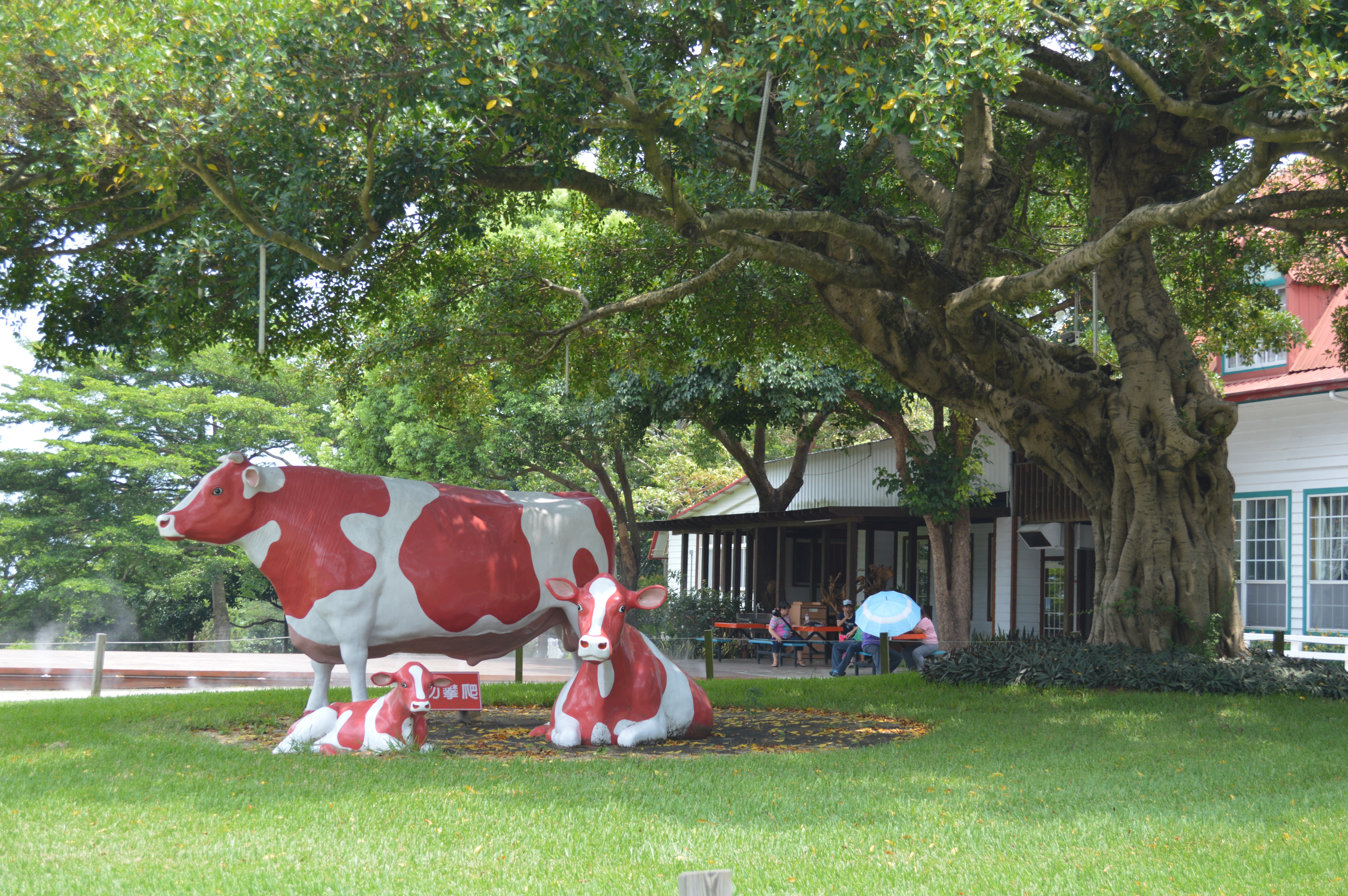
- Town/City: Tongxiao, Miaoli County, Taiwan
- Coordinates: 24°26′31″N 120°44′23″E
- Established: 1975 (as Central Youth Dairy Farm); 1995 (as Flying Cow Ranch)
- Area: 170 ha (420 acres)
- Website: Official website

The Flying Cow Ranch (Chinese: 飛牛牧場; pinyin: Fēiniú Mùchǎng; Wade–Giles: Fei^{1}-niu^{2} Mu^{4}-chang^{3}) is a tourist attraction guest ranch in Nanhe Village, Tongxiao Township, Miaoli County, Taiwan.

== History ==
The ranch was originally established as Central Youth Dairy Farm in 1975. In 1995, it was renamed Flying Cow Ranch.

== Architecture ==
The ranch spans over an area of 50 hectares and the pasture and cow raising area of 120 hectares. It is located at an altitude of 180-270 meters. The ranch features accommodation services, food and beverages services, dairy products sales and barbecue and camping sites.

== Transportation ==
The ranch is accessible south east of Tongxiao Station of Taiwan Railway.

== See also ==
- List of tourist attractions in Taiwan
