= Tunghsiao Power Plant =

Power plant in Tongxiao, Miaoli County, Taiwan

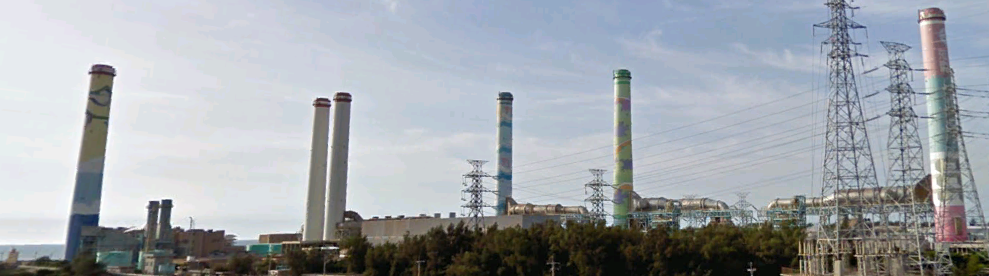
- Official name: 通霄發電廠
- Country: Republic of China
- Location: Tongxiao, Miaoli County, Taiwan
- Coordinates: 24°29′23.7″N 120°40′16″E
- Status: Operational
- Commission date: 28 March 1983 (Unit 1); 30 March 1983 (Unit 2); 31 March 1983 (Unit 3); 22 March 1992 (Unit 4); 1 May 1992 (Unit 5); 30 May 2000 (Unit 6)
- Owner: Taipower
- Operator: Taipower

Thermal power station
- Primary fuel: Liquid natural gas
- Secondary fuel: Fuel oil

Power generation
- Units operational: 6
- Nameplate capacity: 3 X 892.6 MW; 2 X 386 MW; 1 X 321.2 MW

External links
- Commons: Related media on Commons

The Tunghsiao Power Plant or Tongxiao Power Plant (traditional Chinese: 通霄發電廠; simplified Chinese: 通霄发电厂; pinyin: Tōngxiāo Fādiànchǎng) is a gas-fired power plant in Tongxiao Township, Miaoli County, Taiwan. With the installed capacity of ca. 3.8 GW (1.815 GW before the 3 new units went online), the plant is Taiwan's second largest gas-fired power plant after Tatan Power Plant.

== History ==
In the early 1960s, Taipower Company (TPC) decided to set up a power plant in Tongxiao. Initially, Tongxiao Power Plant was fueled with diesel. In 1978, TPC rebuilt the power units with three combined cycle units (the fuel remained diesel, these units also called old #1~#3), they were the first combined cycle units in Taiwan. In 1990, TPC established units #4 and #5, while unit #6 (fueled by natural gas) was built in 1997. Later, TPC decided to renew old #1~#3 units (3 old units generate 763 MW electricity). The New Combined Cycle units started commercial operation on 27 February 2018 (New #1 Unit), 30 May 2019 (New #2 Unit), and 26 May 2020 (New #3 Unit). The new power units are established on the area of removed oil tanks.

On 30 May 2018, a power outage occurred at the power plant at 3:12 p.m. due to the tripping of high voltage transmission line. A total of 70,391 households were left without power. The power was then restored at 4:38 p.m.

== Technical description ==
The new power units have the electricity capacity 892.6 MW each (3 new units are 2677.8 MW), and its heat efficiency is 60.7%.

== Transportation ==
Tunghsiao Power Plant is accessible within walking distance West from Tongxiao Station of Taiwan Railway.

== See also ==
- List of power stations in Taiwan
- List of natural gas power stations
- Electricity sector in Taiwan
