= Baishatun railway station =

Railway station in Tongxiao, Miaoli County, Taiwan

Baishatun 白沙屯
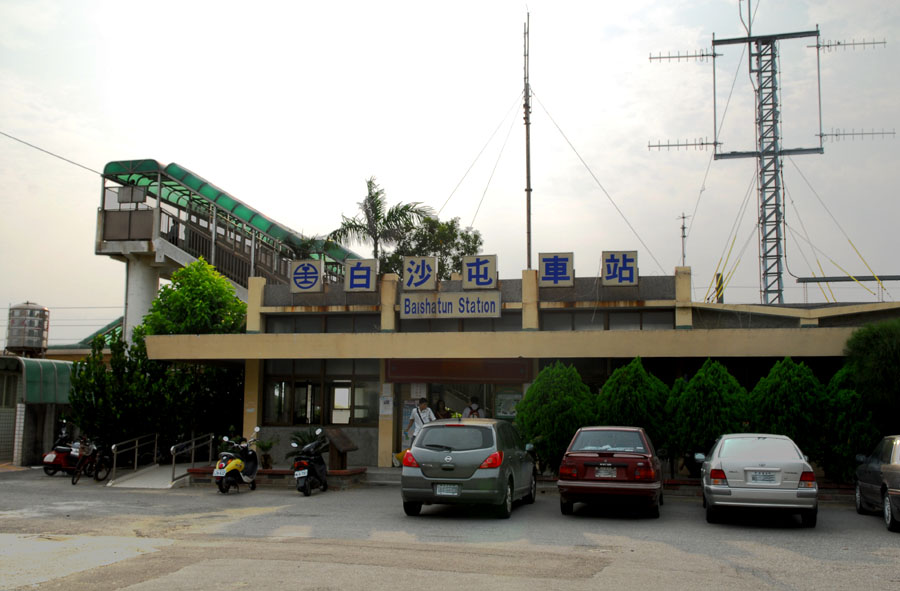

General information
- Location: Tongxiao, Miaoli, Taiwan
- Coordinates: 24°33′50.9″N 120°42′30.6″E
- Operated by: Taiwan Railway Corporation
- Line: Western Trunk line (coastal) (123)
- Distance: 26.7 km from Zhunan

Construction
- Structure type: At-grade

Other information
- Classification: 三等站 (Taiwan Railways Administration level)

History
- Opened: 11 October 1922

Passengers
- 1,829 daily (2024)
Location

Baishatun (Chinese: 白沙屯車站; pinyin: Báishātún Chēzhàn) is a railway station on Taiwan Railway West Coast line (coastal) located in Tongxiao Township, Miaoli County, Taiwan.

== History ==
The station was opened on 11 October 1922.

== Around the station ==
- Taiyen Tongxiao Tourism Factory

== See also ==
- List of railway stations in Taiwan

Preceding station	Taiwan Railway	Following station
Houlong towards Keelung	Western Trunk line	Xinpu towards Pingtung
