= Tongxiao Shrine =

Shrine in Tongxiao, Miaoli County, Taiwan

- 通霄神社
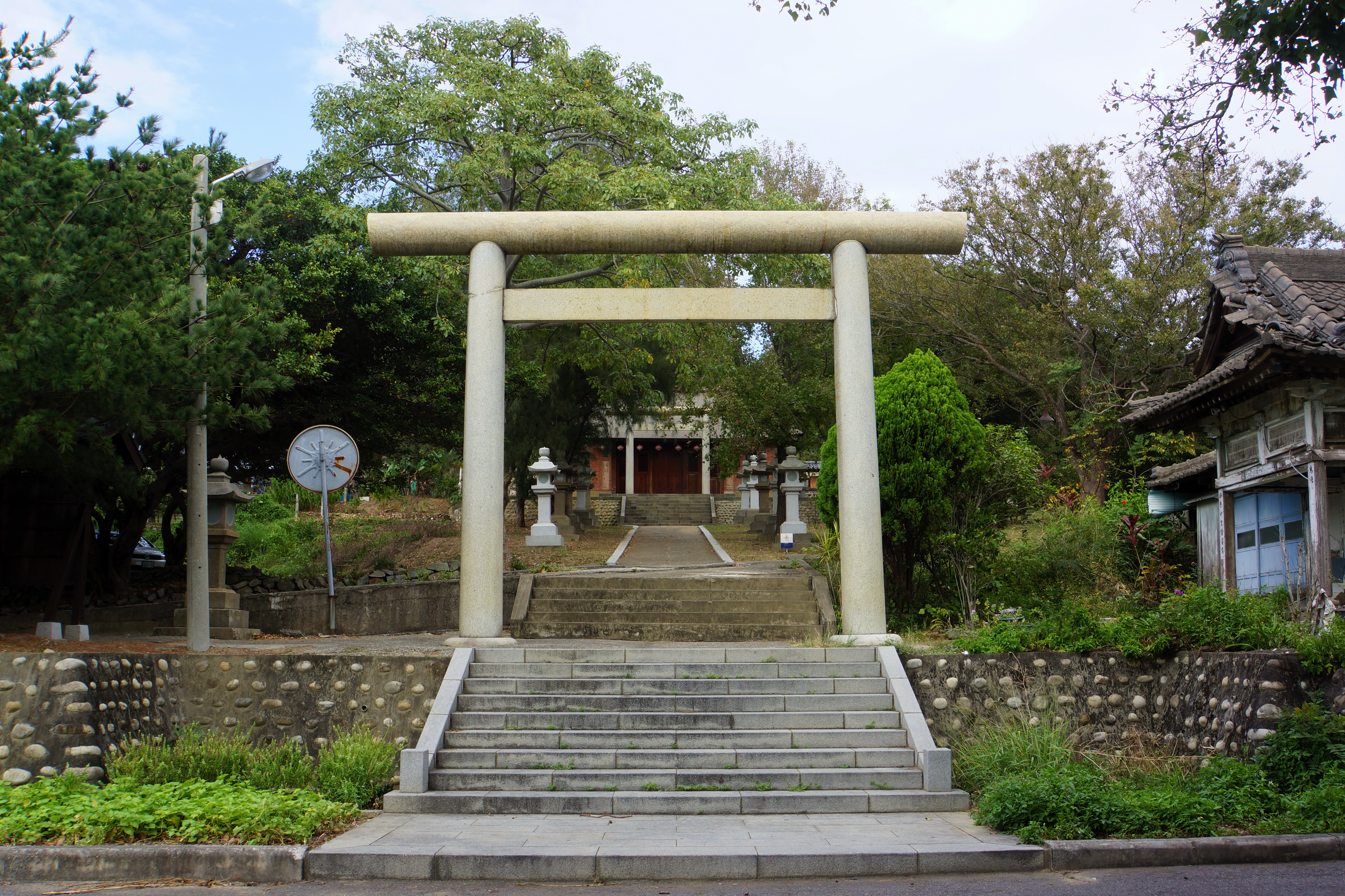

- Location within Miaoli County

Location
- Location: Tongxiao, Miaoli County, Taiwan
- Interactive map of Tongxiao Shrine
- Coordinates: 24°29′32.6″N 120°40′58.3″E

Architecture
- Type: shrine
- Completed: 1937

The Tongxiao Shrine (Chinese: 通霄神社; pinyin: Tōngxiāo Shénshè) is a shrine in Tongxiao Township, Miaoli County, Taiwan.

== History ==
The shrine was built in 1937 during the Japanese rule of Taiwan. After the handover of Taiwan from Japan to the Republic of China, the main hall of the shrine was renovated by Tongxiao Mayor into the Tongxiao Zhonglie Shrine in 1947 for people to honor the fallen Republic of China Armed Forces in World War II. The shrine was damaged by the Jiji earthquake in 1999. In 2002, the government designated the shrine as historical monument and restored it. The main shrine has eventually turned into Martyr's Shrine and honour Koxinga.

== Transportation ==
The shrine is accessible within walking distance north east of Tongxiao Station of Taiwan Railway.

== See also ==
- Gongtian Temple
- List of tourist attractions in Taiwan
