= Xinpu railway station =

Railway station in Miaoli, Taiwan

Xinpu Station 新埔車站
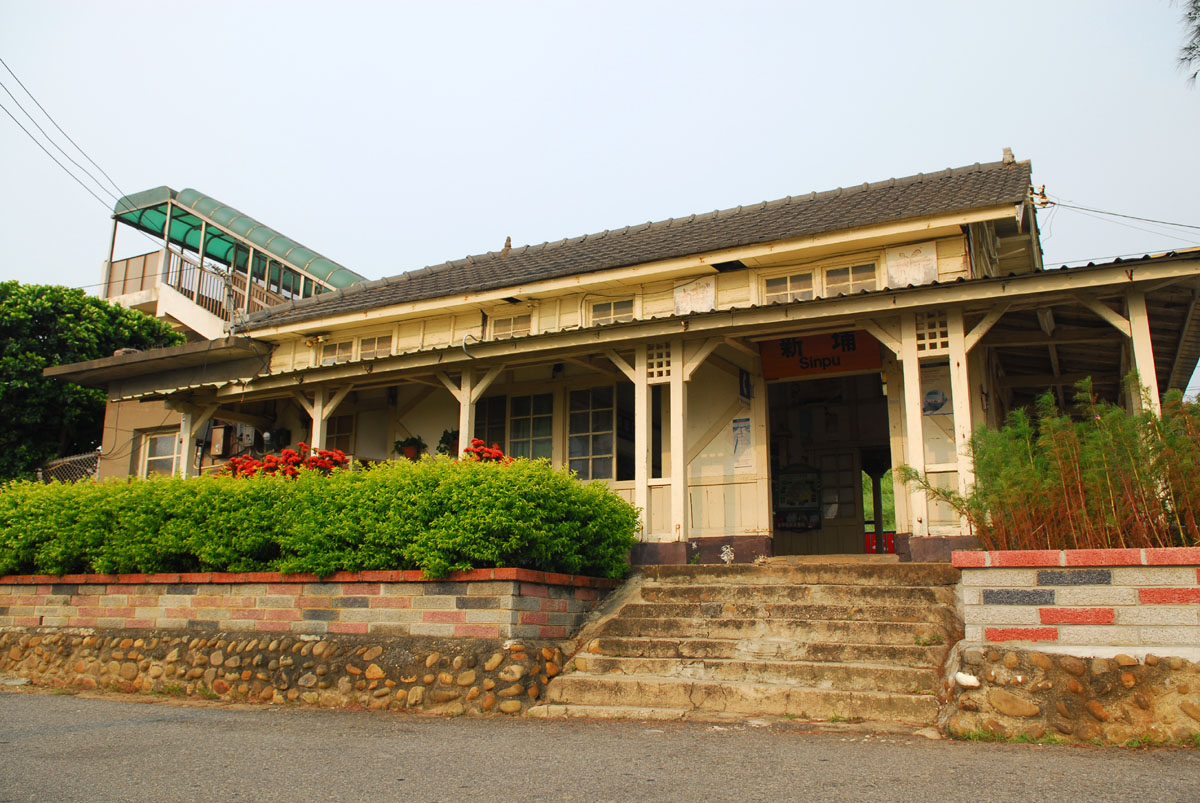

General information
- Location: Tongxiao, Miaoli County, Taiwan
- Coordinates: 24°32′26.2″N 120°41′43.7″E
- System: Train station
- Owner: Taiwan Railway
- Operator: Taiwan Railway
- Line: Western Trunk line
- Train operators: Taiwan Railway

History
- Opened: 11 October 1922
Location

Xinpu (Chinese: 新埔車站; Hanyu Pinyin: Xīnpù Chēzhàn; Tongyong Pinyin: Sinpù Chejhàn) is a railway station on Taiwan Railway West Coast line (Coastal line) located in Tongxiao Township, Miaoli County, Taiwan, since 11 October 1922.

== See also ==
- List of railway stations in Taiwan

Preceding station	Taiwan Railway	Following station
Baishatun towards Keelung	Western Trunk line	Tongxiao towards Pingtung
