= Baishatun Mazu Pilgrimage =

Taoist pilgrimage in Taiwan

Baishatun Mazu Pilgrimage 白沙屯媽祖進香
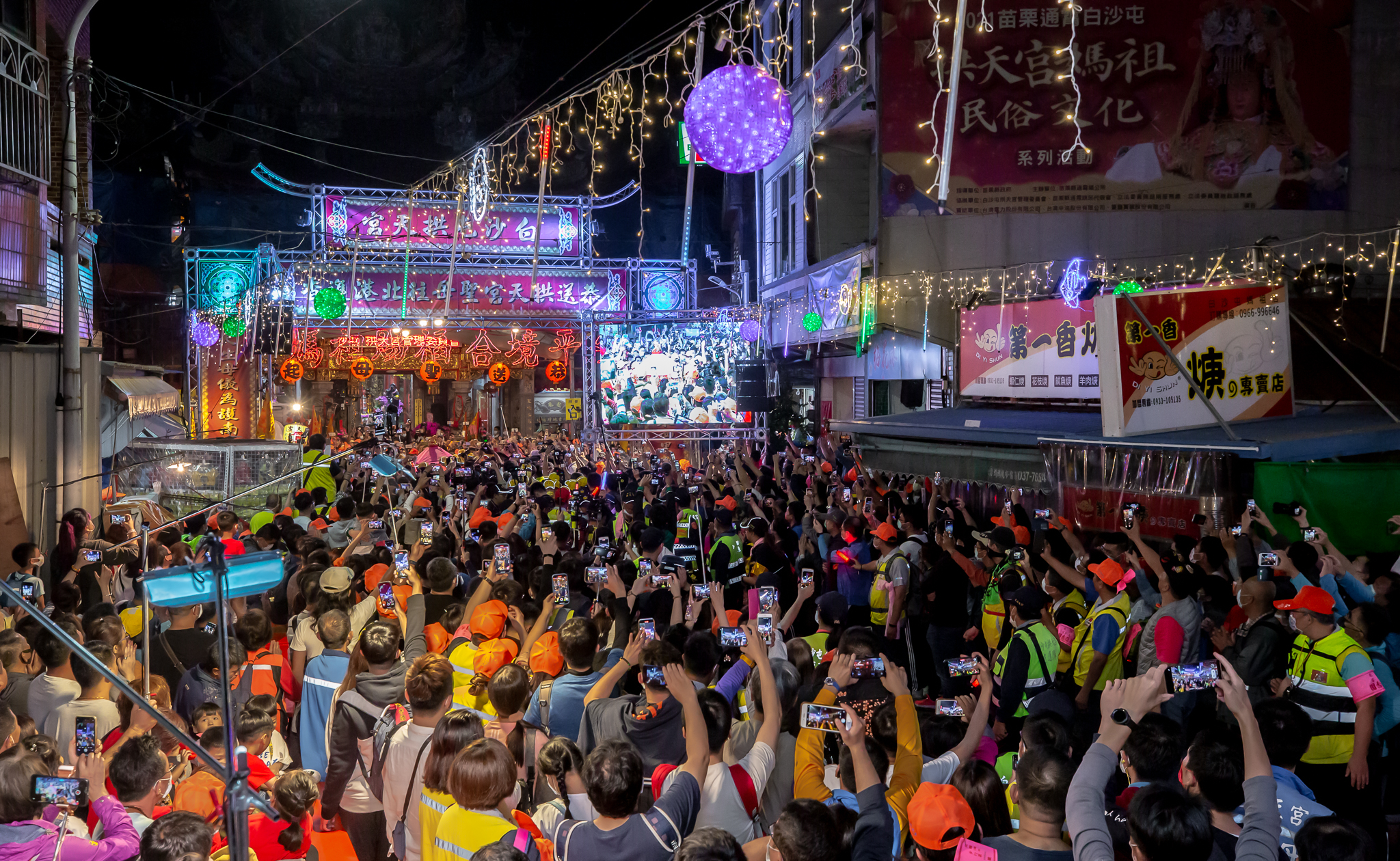
- 2021 Baishatun Mazu Pilgrimage
- Dates: between lunar The first and the fourth lunar months
- Frequency: Annual
- Locations: Between Tongxiao and Chaotian Temple
- Country: Taiwan

The Baishatun Mazu Pilgrimage (Chinese: 白沙屯媽祖進香; pinyin: Báishātún Māzǔ jìnxiāng; Pe̍h-ōe-jī: Pe̍h-sua-tun má-tsóo tsìn-hiunn) is usually held annually between lunar January and April in the western plains of Taiwan, a major Taoist religious event since 1863. After every lunar new year, the Mazu statue of Gongtian Temple (Chinese: 拱天宮; pinyin: Gǒng tiāngōng) at Baishatun, Tongxiao of Miaoli County, is placed in a palanquin and carried in procession to visit another Mazu Temple- Chaotian Temple (Chinese: 朝天宮; pinyin: Cháo tiāngōng), located in the area of Beigang of Yunlin County, then returns to Gongtian Temple to end this pilgrimage. The distance covered is approximately 400 km total.

There is another Mazu statue, called "Mazu of the Mountain Side (Chinese: 山邊媽祖; pinyin: Shān-biān māzǔ)", from Houlong Township (Chinese: 後龍鎮) of Miaoli county, that would accompany Baishatun Mazu during the pilgrimage as well.

== Feature ==
Mazu, also spelled as "Matsu", known as a sea goddess who blesses the fishermen with a safe journey during sailing, is widely revered by believers in Taiwan because of her merciful image. Therefore, the Mazu pilgrimage is one of the popular religious activities in Taiwan.

During the whole pilgrimage, Mazu's palanquin carriers go forward only on foot. Many pilgrims would follow the steps of Mazu's palanquin, traditionally following by walking, but regardless, plenty of the pilgrims would travel by scooter, car, or bicycle. Moreover, the duration and route of Baishatun pilgrimage are not the same in different years, such as 6 days and 5 nights in 2009, versus 12 days and 11 nights in 2017.

The most unique feature of the Baishatun pilgrimage is the route. No matter how it departs or returns, the route is unpredictable, and changes each time. Supposedly, Mazu's palanquin carriers stated that they held the ability to feel Mazu's will, and that she indicated to them the next direction or where to stop while they were walking. However, pilgrims only know the start point and destination. Therefore, people regard the Baishatun Mazu pilgrimage as the most challenging pilgrimage in Taiwan.

== Gallery ==
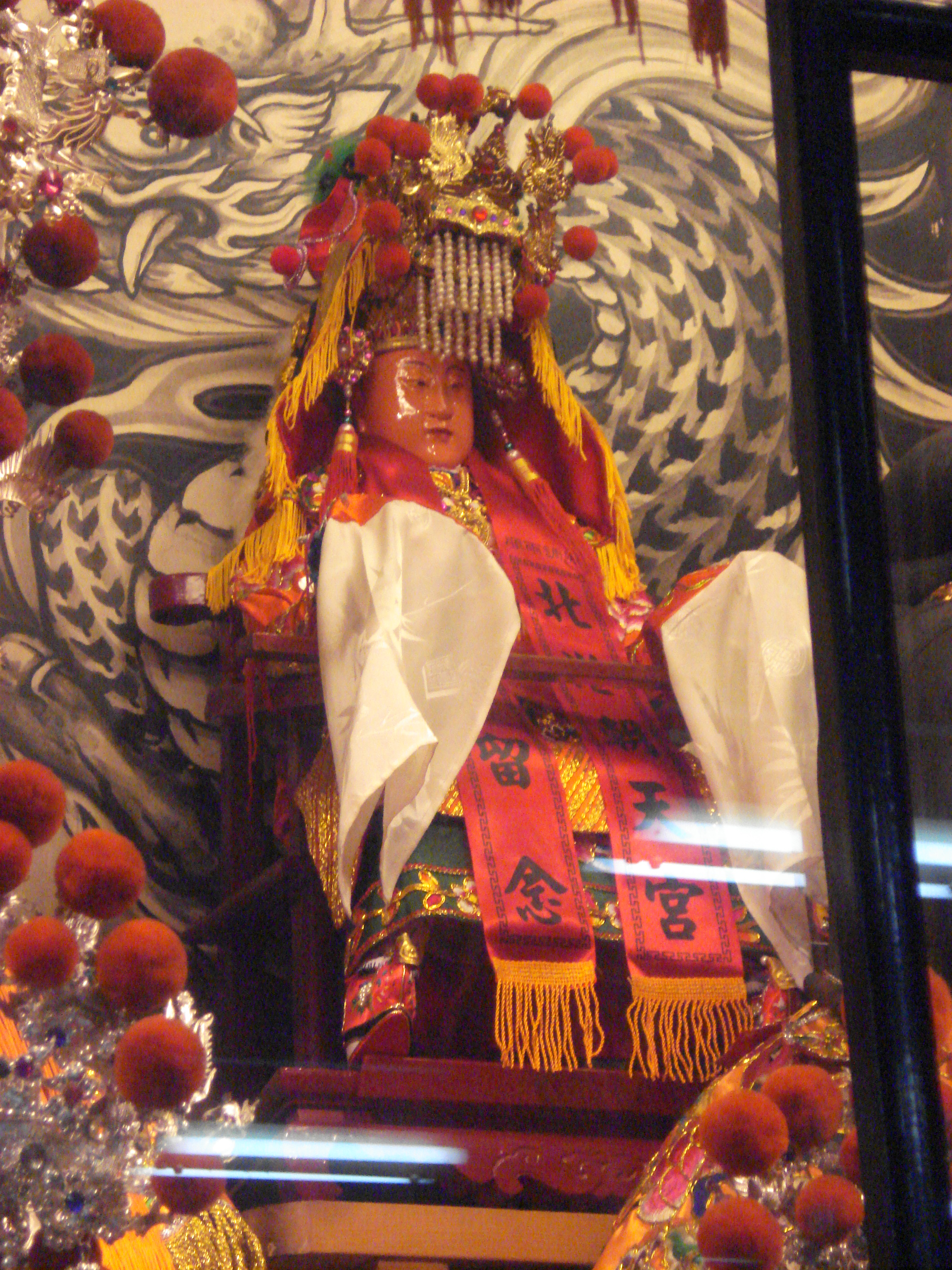
Baishatun Mazu Statue (Pink-faced)

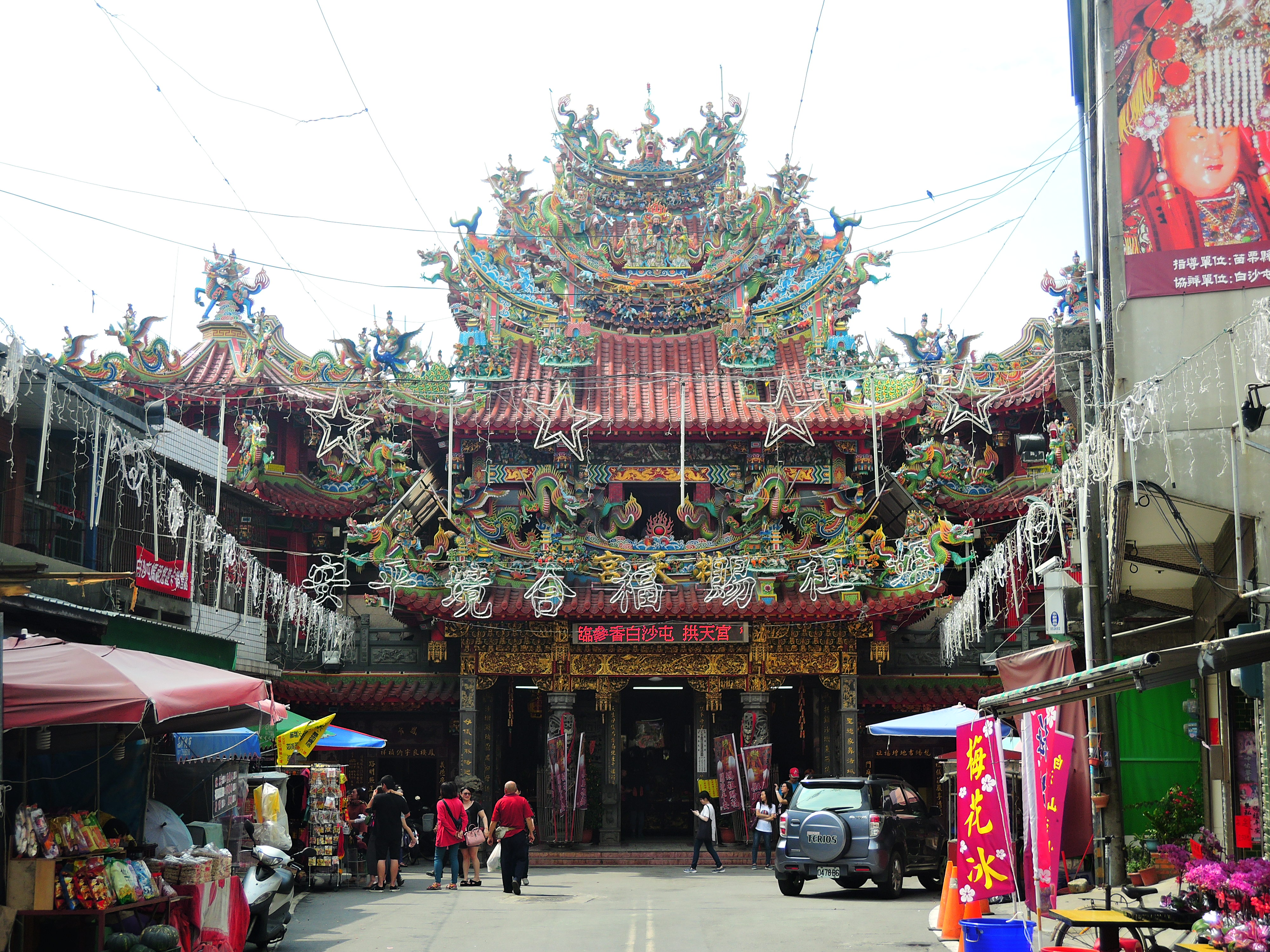
Baishatun Gongtian Temple, Tongxiao, Miaoli County

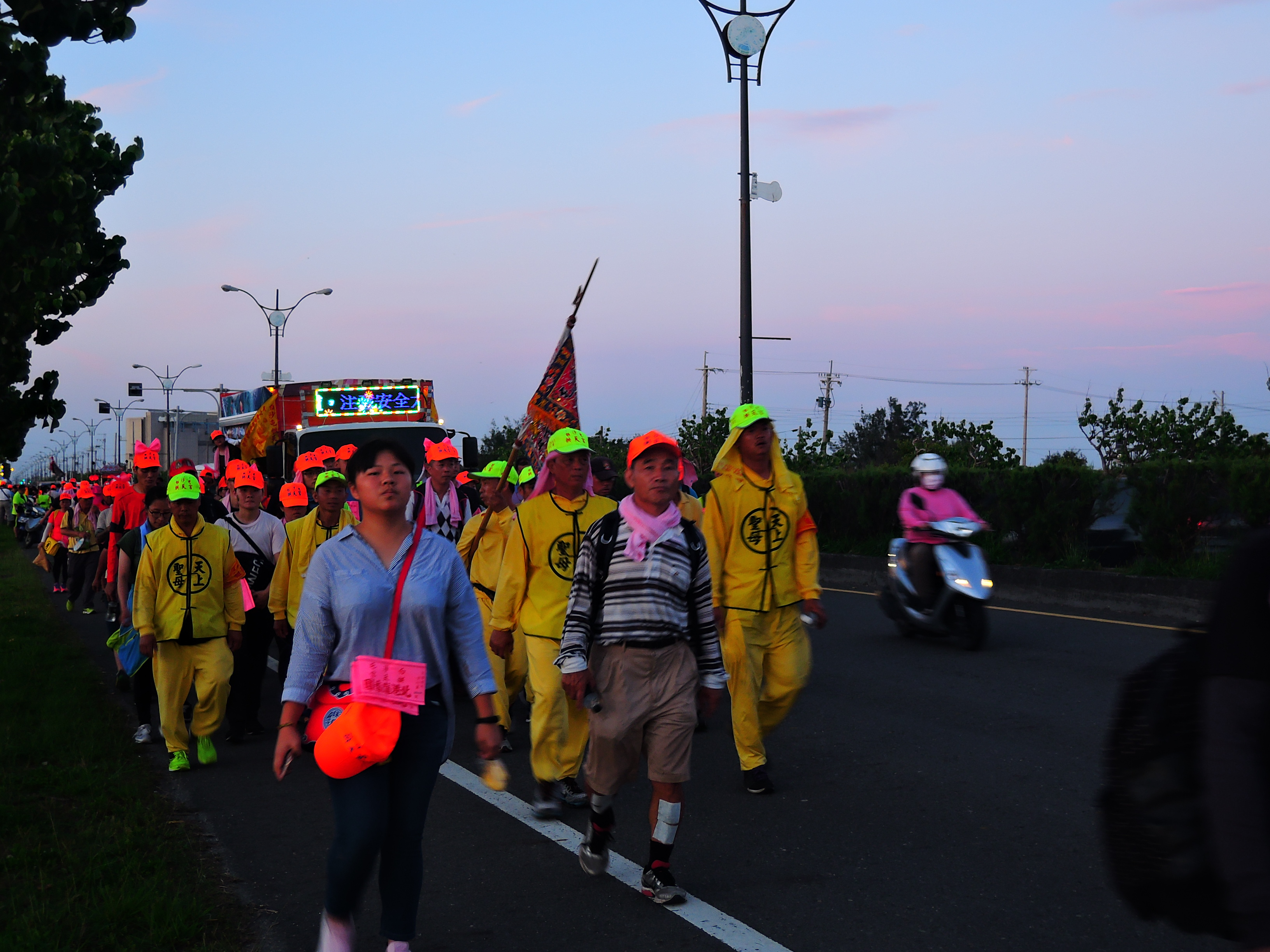
The pilgrims

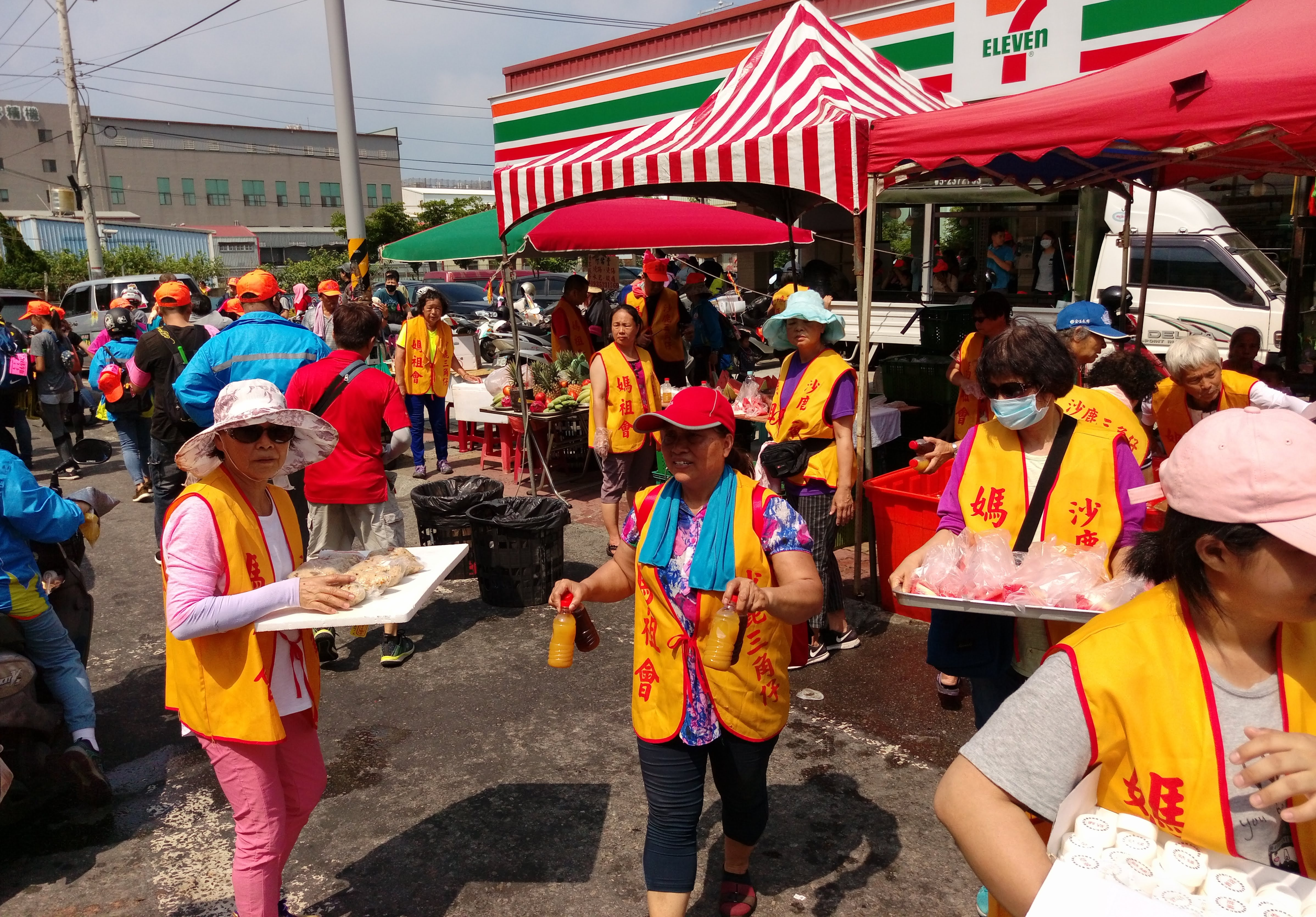
By tradition, residents offer free supplies to pilgrims.

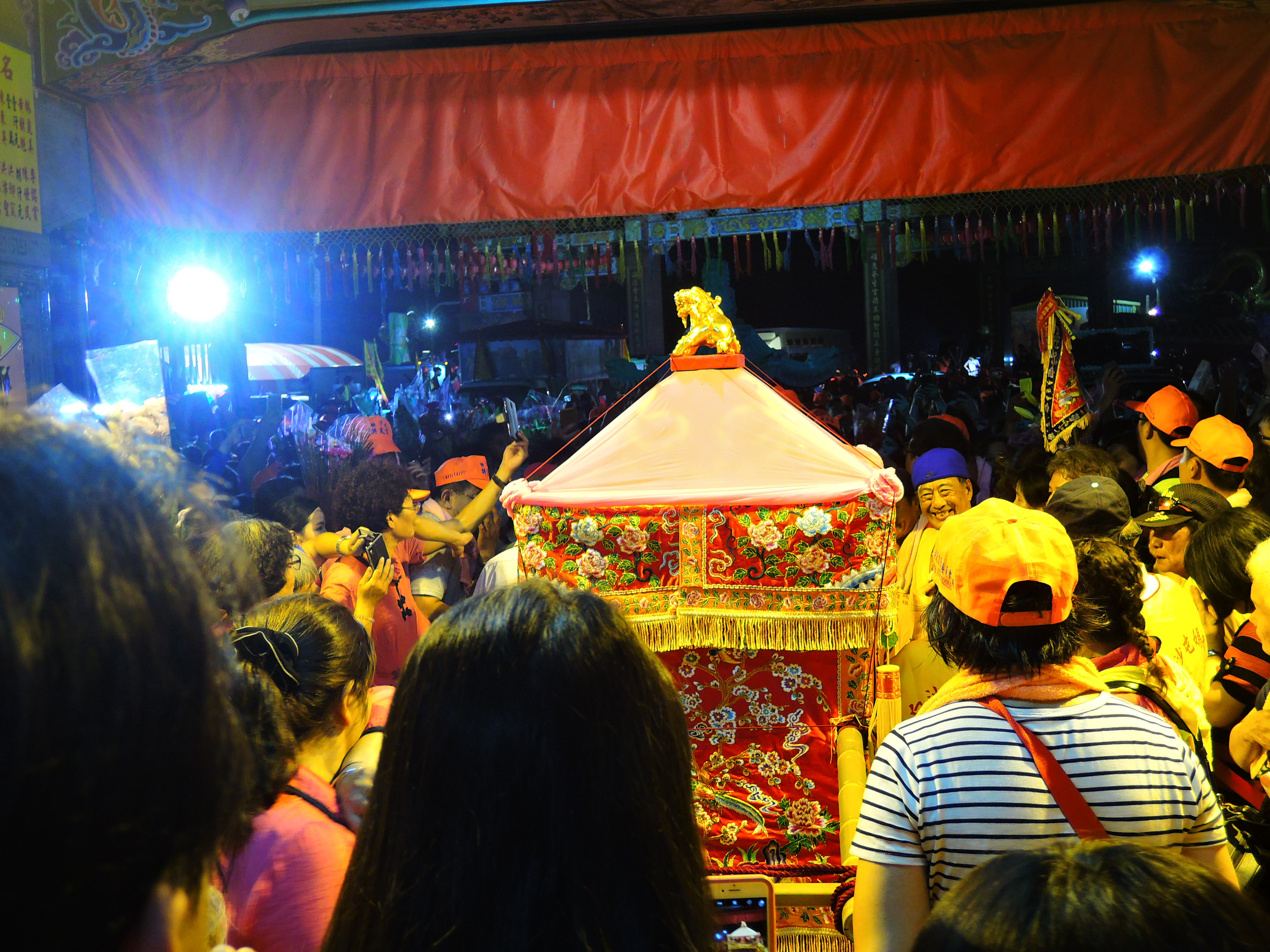
Baishatun Mazu's palanquin

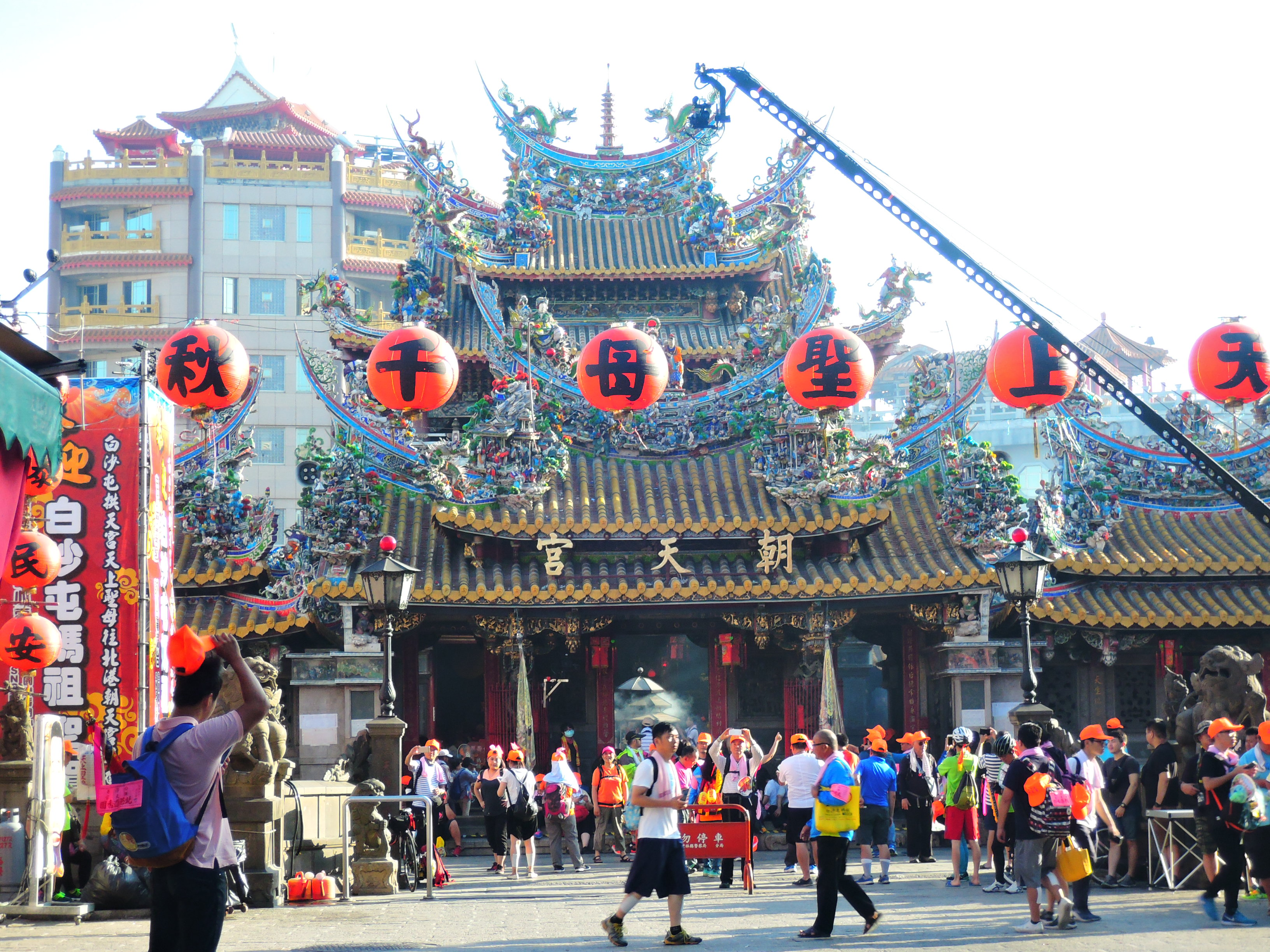
Beigang Chaotian Temple, Yunlin County

== See also ==
- Dajia Mazu Pilgrimage
