= Gongtian Temple =

Temple in Miaoli County, Taiwan

- 拱天宮
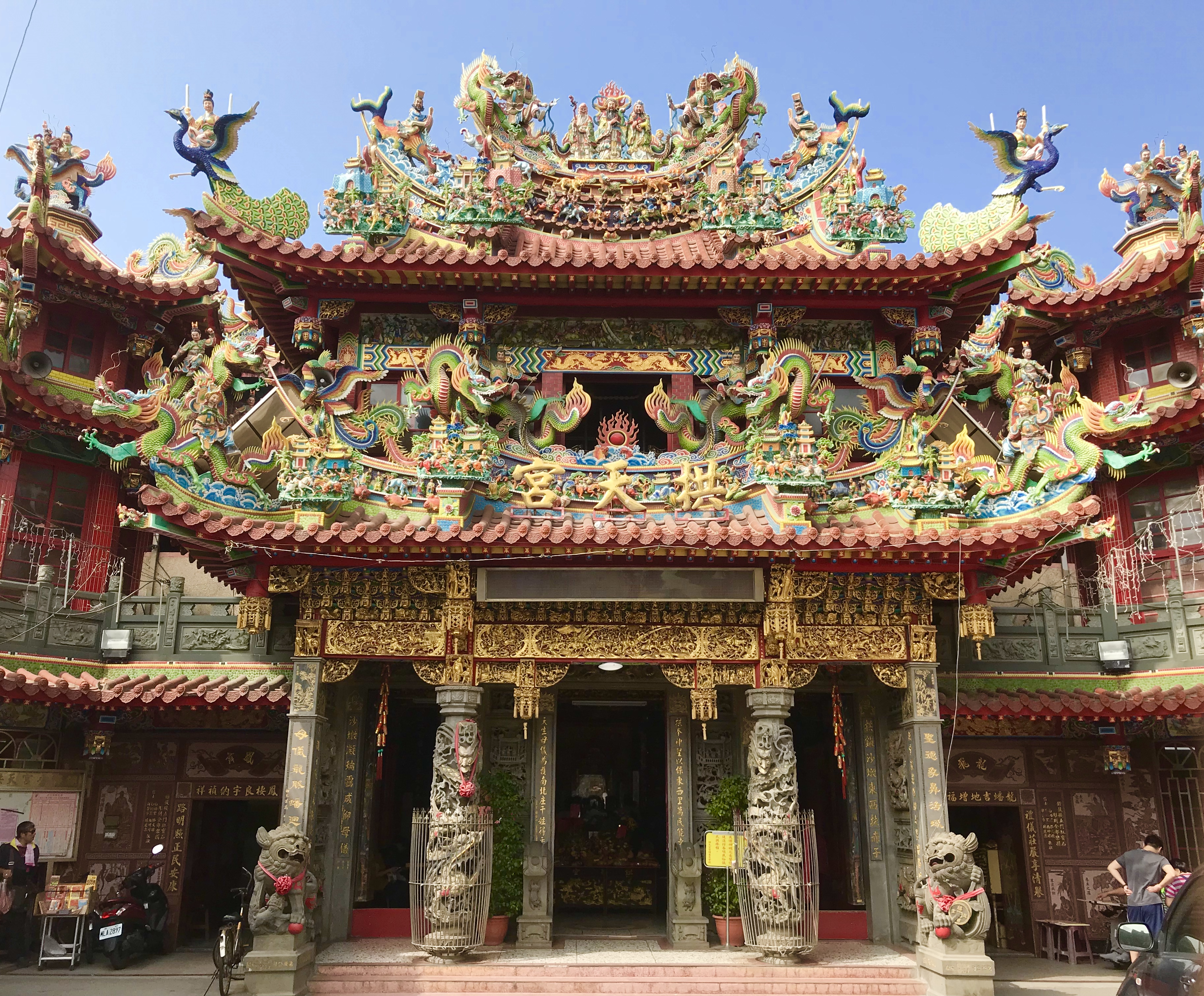

Religion
- Affiliation: Taoism
- Deity: Mazu

Location
- Location: Tongxiao, Miaoli County, Taiwan
- Interactive map of Gongtian Temple
- Coordinates: 24.5714°N 120.7091°E

Architecture
- Completed: 1863
- Direction of façade: Southeast

Baishatun Gongtian Temple (Chinese: 白沙屯拱天宮; pinyin: Báishātún Gǒngtiān Gōng) is a temple located in Baishatun, Tongxiao Township, Miaoli County, Taiwan. The temple is dedicated to the sea goddess Mazu, who is the deified form of Lin Moniang. Gongtian Temple is noted for its annual Baishatun Mazu Pilgrimage, where worshippers travel to Chaotian Temple in Beigang, Yunlin on foot.

== History ==
The coastal village of Baishatun was first inhabited during the reign of Qianlong Emperor, where a rudimentary temple was built here to pray for the safety of fishermen. Towards the end of Xianfeng Emperor's reign, local residents donated money to build a larger temple made of brick, which was completed in 1863 (Tongzhi 2); this temple was named Gongtian Temple. Later, the temple was renovated twice, in 1936 and 1990, into the reinforced concrete structure today.

Formerly, visitors by car must cross railway tracks and drive through tight alleys to get to Gongtian Temple, which caused congestion and traffic accidents. Therefore, in 2019, an overpass was built specifically for tourists, which goes around Baishatun to connect Provincial Highway 1 with Gongtian Temple's parking lot.

== Architecture and deities ==
Gongtian Temple is a three-story reinforced concrete building, where the first floor is dedicated to Mazu, the second to Guanyin, and the third to Jimnu Niangniang. There are also altars for Shennong and Guan Yu.

The Mazu statue that is used on the annual pilgrimage is named Dama (大媽) and has movable limbs. This statue predates the temple itself; temple officials believe that the statue is at least two hundred years old. The temple also owns two more Mazu statues known as Erma (二媽) and Sanma (粉面). The former's face is painted black, while the latter's face is skin-toned. These two statues do not embark on the pilgrimage to Beigang; however, Erma is used on tours within Baishatun itself, while Sanma is used during festivals in the temple.

== Baishatun Mazu Pilgrimage ==
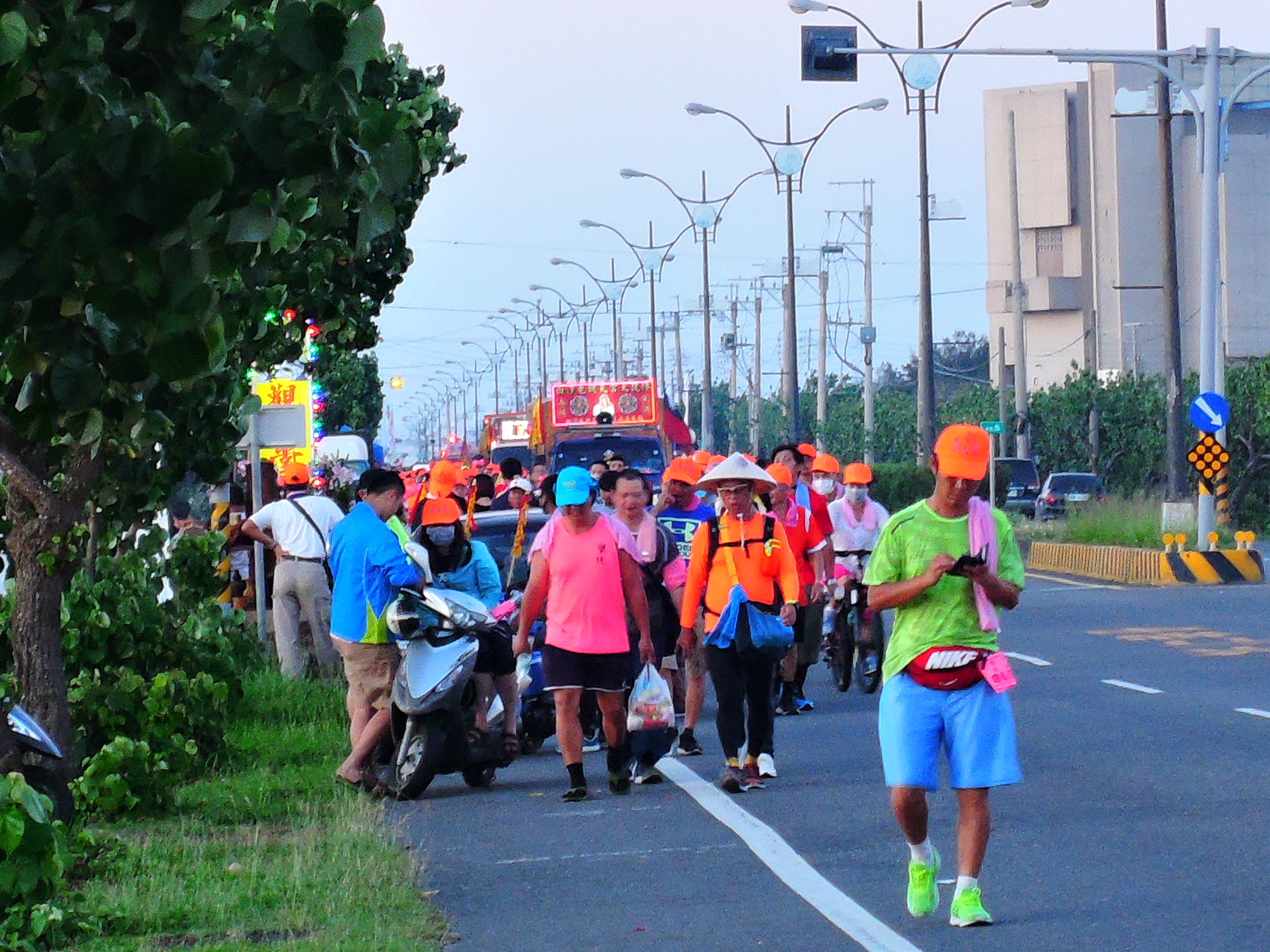
Pilgrims in Fangyuan, Changhua County

Prior to the completion of Gongtian Temple, Baishatun residents already had the practice of making pilgrimages to Chaotian Temple and other major temples in the south on foot. Unlike the similar Dajia Mazu Pilgrimage, the Baishatun Mazu Pilgrimage does not have a set route; rather, the route is determined on the way by Mazu and the people that carry the statue. In 2010, the pilgrimage was recognized as a national cultural asset.
