= Chaotian Temple =

Temple to the Chinese sea-goddess Mazu

Coordinates: 23°34′04″N 120°18′16″E

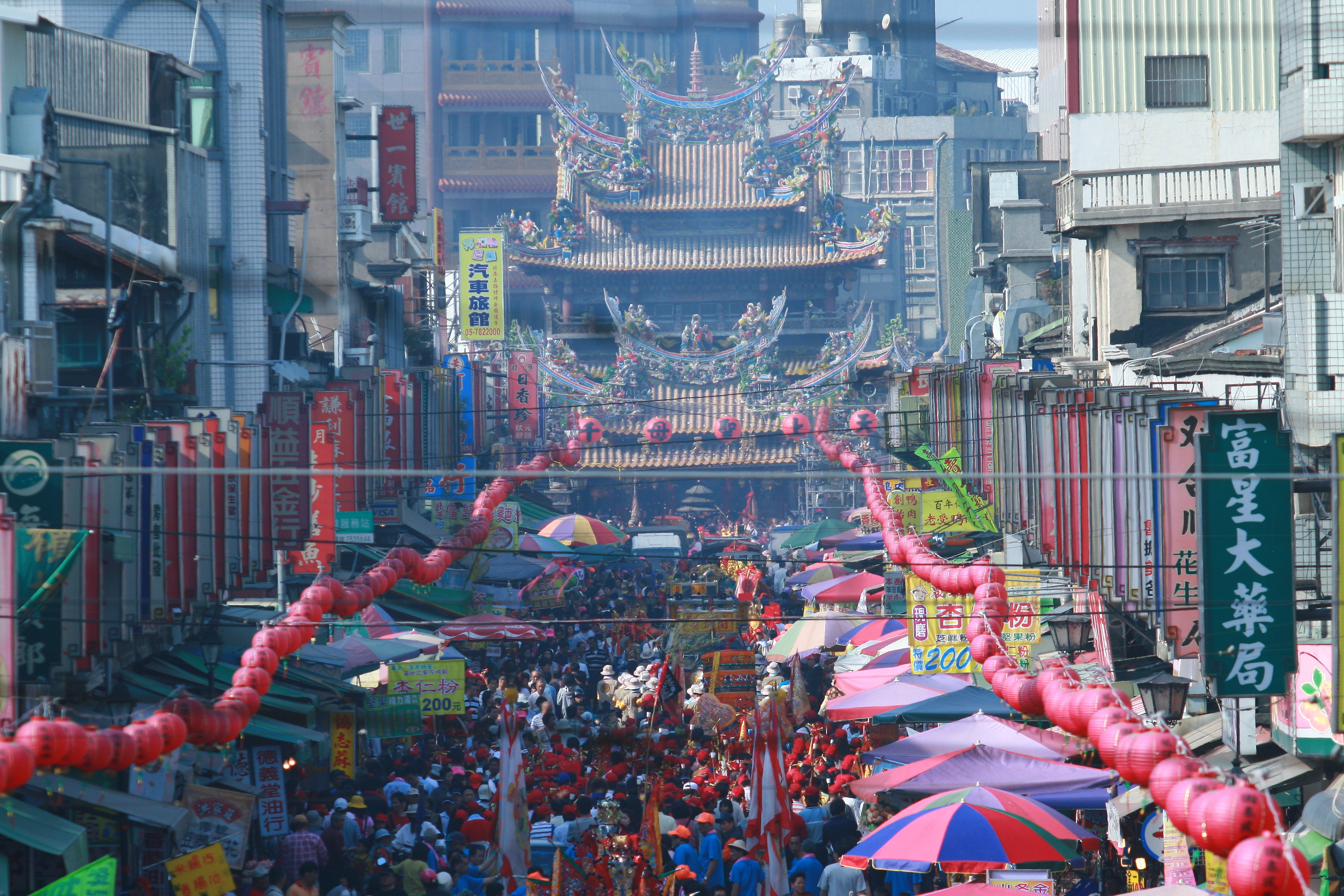
- Chaotian Temple during the week-long birthday celebrations for Mazu in 2009.
- Traditional Chinese: 朝天宮
- Literal meaning: Facing-Heaven Palace
Transcriptions
Standard Mandarin
- Hanyu Pinyin: Cháotiān Gōng
Southern Min
- Hokkien POJ: Tiâu-thian-kiong

The Chaotian or Chaotien Temple, officially the Chao-Tian Temple, is a temple to the goddess Mazu in Beigang Township, Yunlin County, Taiwan. Constructed in 1700, it became one of the most important Mazu temples in Taiwan and is known for its extravagant temple architecture. It is visited by more than a million pilgrims every year.

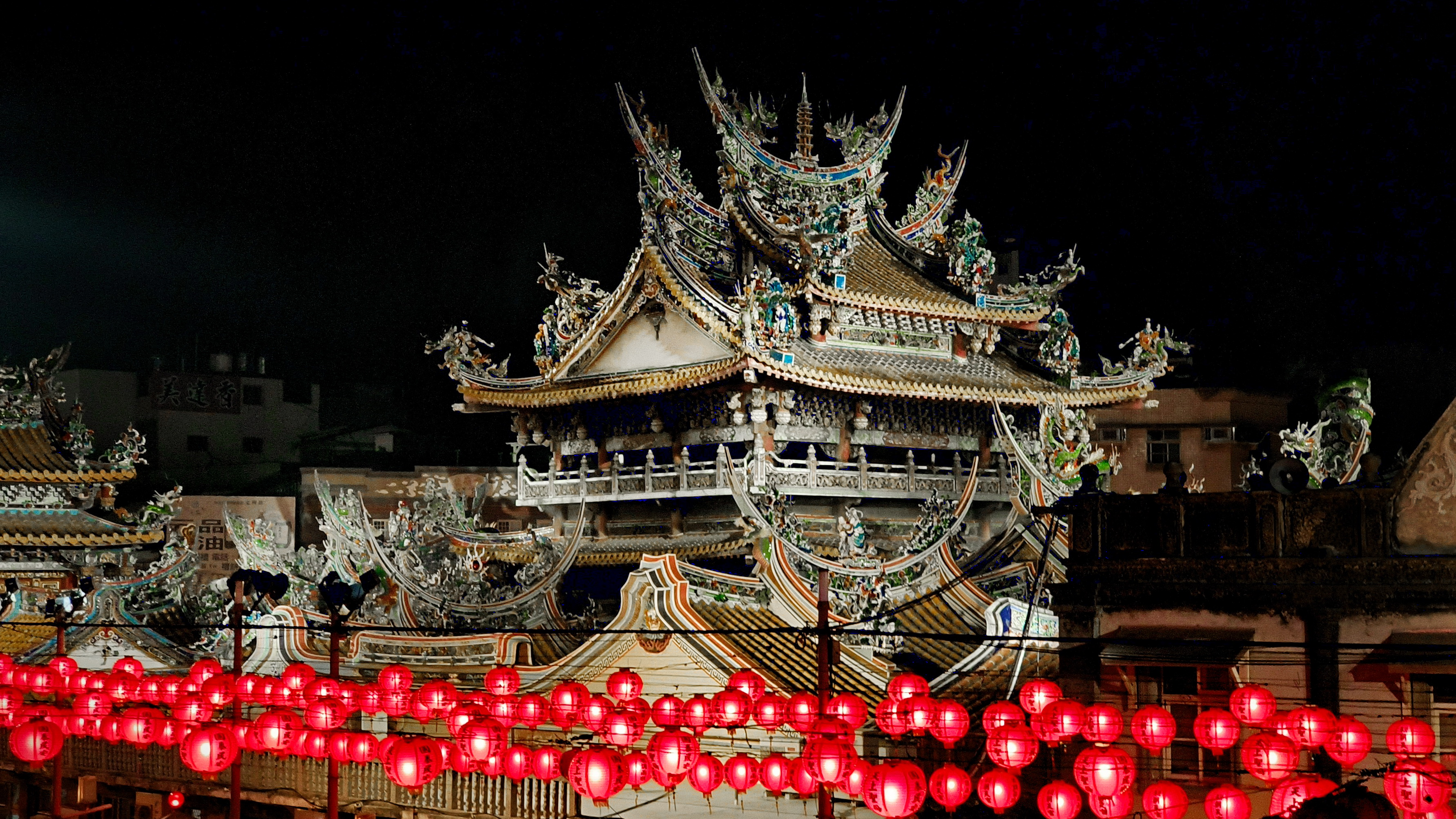
Chaotian Temple at night

== Mazuism ==
Mazu, the deified form of the medieval Lin Moniang from Fujian, has an enthusiastic following in Taiwan. Beigang was one of the most important Taiwanese ports in the 17th century. As Beigang and its economy grew, at the same time the temple grew and expanded. Today the Chaotian Temple at Beigang is an important religious site and pilgrimage destination. Beigang's Mazu tours to other Mazu temples through whole Taiwan every year for visits and inspections.

== History ==
In 1694, a Buddhist monk named Shubi requested that a statue of Mazu be brought to Beigang from the Chaotian Temple in her hometown of Meizhou in Fujian. In 1700, Chen Li-Shum donated a building lot and raised the funds to erect Beigang's own Chaotian Temple. In 1730, the temple was further expanded. In 1770, Penkang Magistrate Hsueh Chao-heng considered that the temple too simple to live up to the dignity of Goddess Matsu. Three years later another reconstruction of the temple started. In 1854 a number of ranking officials initiated a third project, expanding the temple into a palace-type architectural complex. The front wing consisted of worship courtyard and east and west chambers. The second wing was for worship of the Heavenly Mother, third wing for Goddess of mercy; east wing for San-Kuan Heavenly Emperors, west wing for Wenchang God, the 4th wing for Goddess Matsu's parents; east wing for Goddess of Childgiving and west wing, Lang God. Several renovation followed in the 20th century.

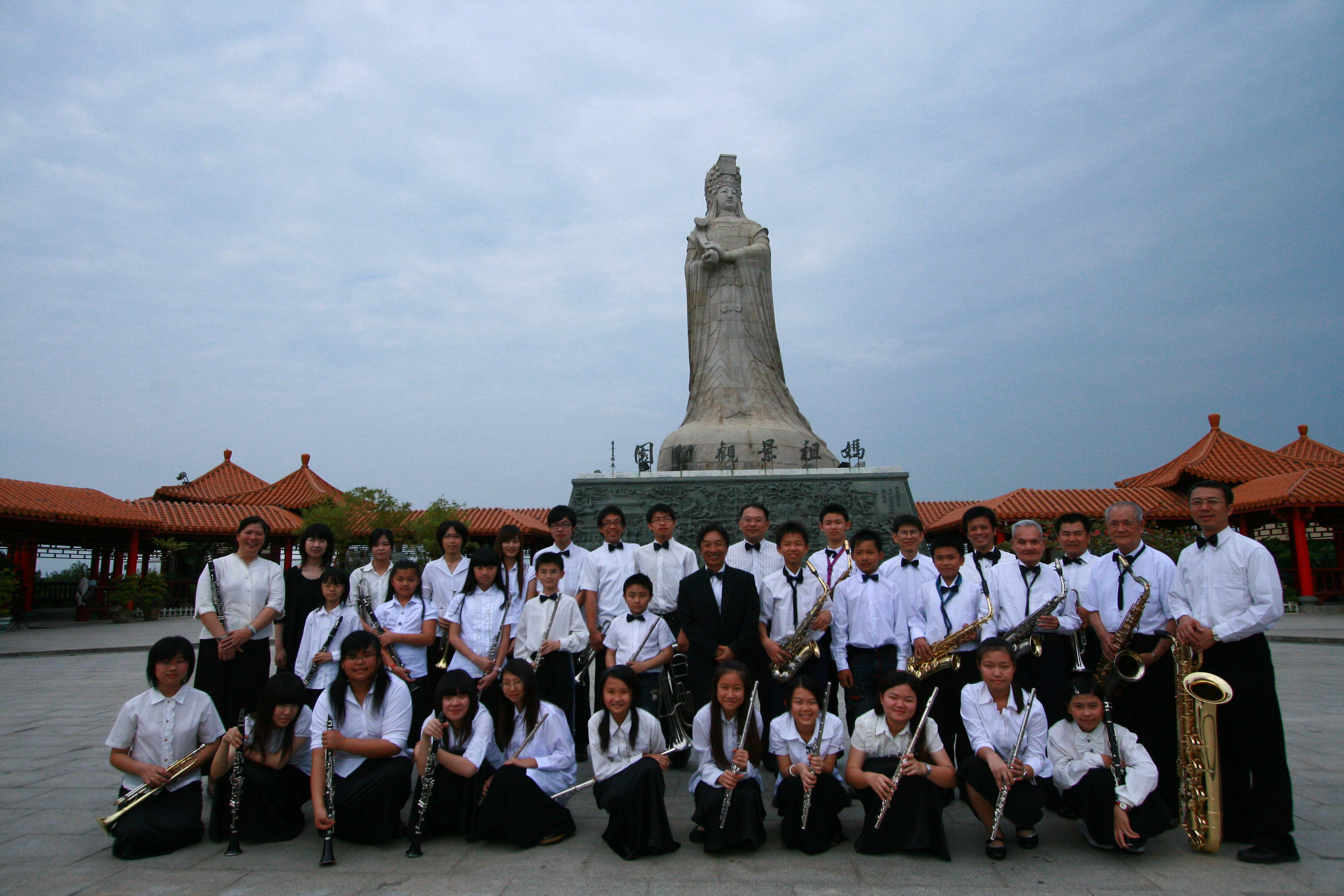
The Beigang Wind Orchestra in front of the Mazu-statue at the Chaotian's temple's Cultural Hall in 2009. Chief conductor Chen Che-Cheng stands in the middle.

== Cultural activities ==
The Chaotian Temple also owns a cultural hall, where concert, dances and other activities take place. On top of the building is a statue of Mazu. The Chaotian Temple also sponsors events like the Beigang International Music Festival. Since 2020 and the beginning of the COVID-19 pandemic, a Buddhist Shuilu Fahui ceremony is sponsored by Chaotian Temple to pray for the eradication of the virus.

The Beigang Wind Orchestra was founded in 1928 by Chen Chia-Hu (陳家湖). On spiritual days the orchestra marches for the Chaotian temple.

The Flying Dragons are a dragon dance troupe affiliated with the Chaotian Temple, founded by Weng San-lien around 1924. Creation of two Great Dragon Flags began in 1926, and the flags were used in processions until the 1950s.

== See also ==
- Qianliyan & Shunfeng'er
- List of Mazu temples around the world
- Baishatun Mazu Pilgrimage
- Gongfan Temple
- Xiluo Guangfu Temple
- Gongtian Temple, Miaoli County
- Nanyao Temple, Changhua County
- Bengang Tianhou Temple, Chiayi County
- List of temples in Taiwan
- Religion in Taiwan
