= Taiyen Tongxiao Tourism Factory =

Coordinates: 24°33′22.9″N 120°42′15.1″E

- 臺鹽通霄精鹽廠觀光工廠
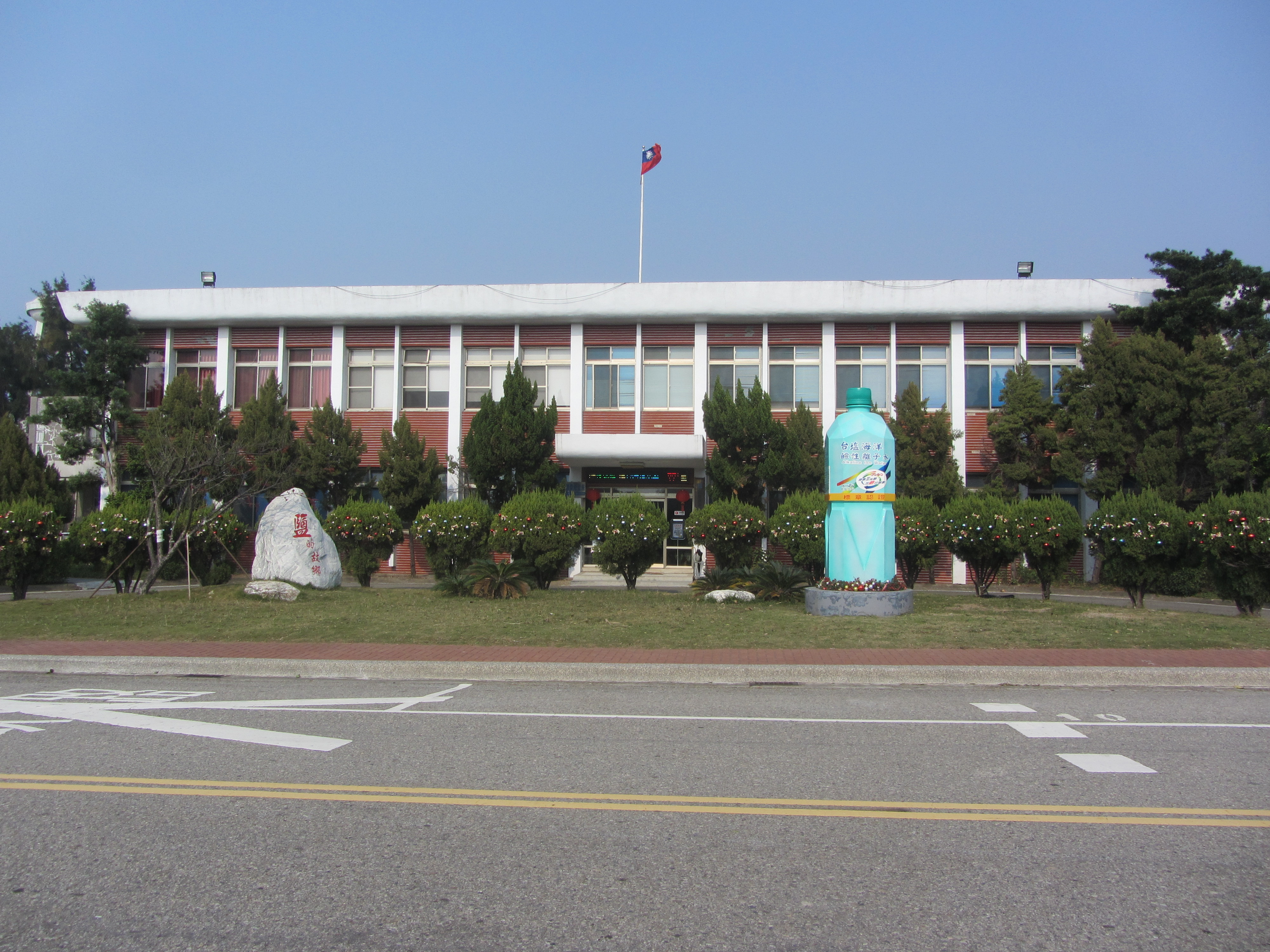
- Interactive map of the Taiyen Tongxiao Tourism Factory area

General information
- Location: Tongxiao, Miaoli County, Taiwan

Website
- Official website

The Taiyen Tongxiao Tourism Factory (traditional Chinese: 臺鹽通霄精鹽廠觀光工廠; simplified Chinese: 台盐通霄精盐厂观光工厂; pinyin: Táiyán Tōngxiāo Jīngyán Chǎng Guānguāng Gōngchǎng) is an education center in Neidao Village, Tongxiao Township, Miaoli County, Taiwan, committed to promote education in salt and water technology.

== Attractions ==
- Taiyen Museum
- Salt Ancestor Statue
- Ocean Foot Spa and Cafeteria
- Sales Center
- Cultural Creativity Salt Sculpture Area
- Solar Salt Processing Plant
- Drink Plant
- Electrodialysis Workshop
- Drying and Packaging Workshop
- Product Warehouse

== Transportation ==
The center is accessible within walking distance south of Baishatun Station of Taiwan Railway.

== See also ==
- List of museums in Taiwan
