= Beigang Tourist Bridge =

Footbridge in Chiayi and Yunlin County, Taiwan

Beigang Tourist Bridge 北港觀光大橋
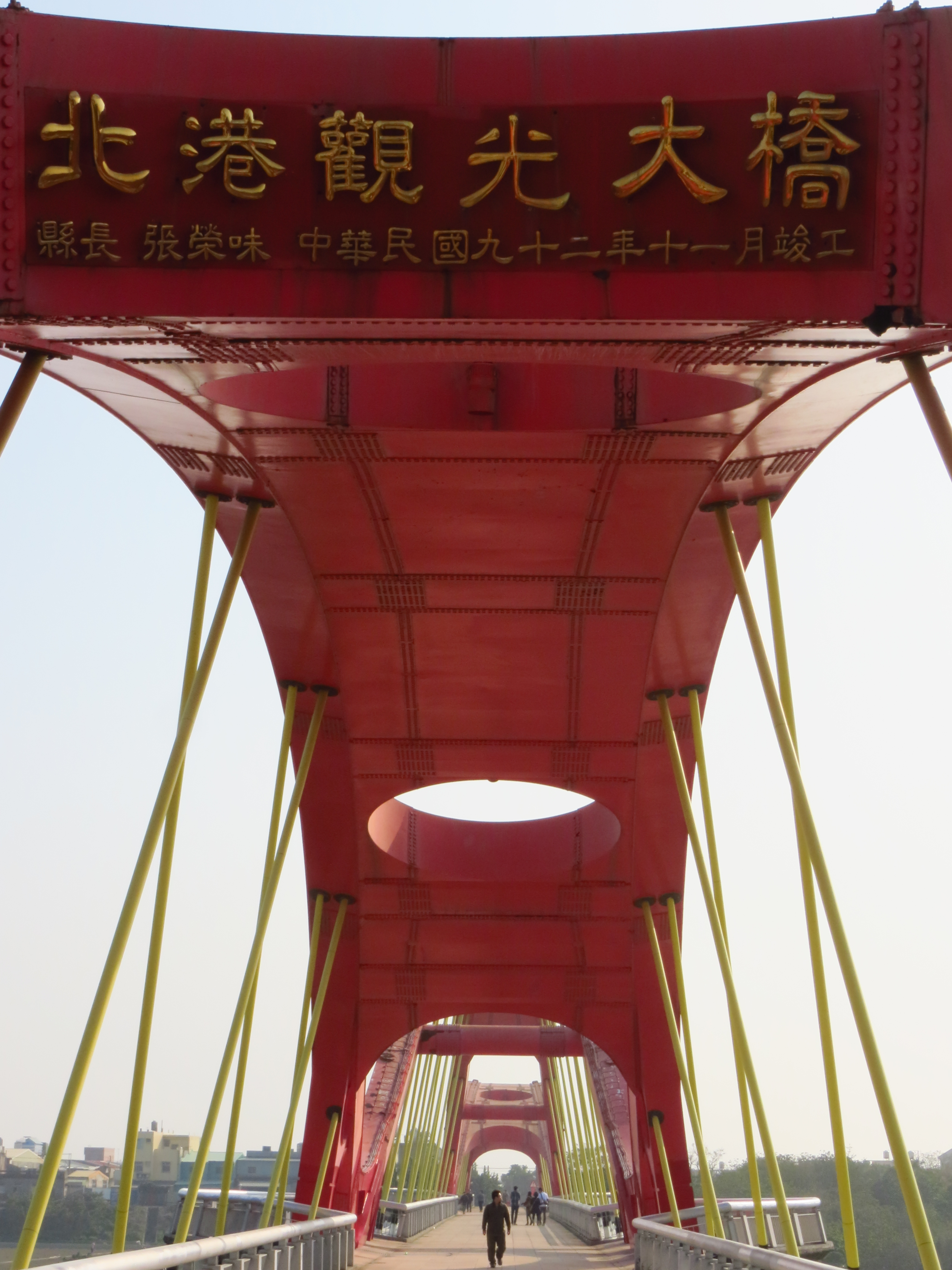
- Coordinates: 23°33′43.7″N 120°18′12.9″E
- Crosses: Beigang River
- Locale: Lioujiao, Chiayi County and Beigang, Yunlin County in Taiwan

Characteristics
- Design: arch bridge
- Total length: 268.5 metres (881 ft)
- Width: 7 m (23 ft)

History
- Opened: November 2003

Location
- Interactive map of Beigang Tourist Bridge

The Beigang Tourist Bridge (traditional Chinese: 北港觀光大橋; simplified Chinese: 北港观光大桥; pinyin: Běigǎng Guānguāng Dàqiáo) is a footbridge in Lioujiao Township, Chiayi County and Beigang Township, Yunlin County in Taiwan. The bridge crosses over Beigang River.

== Features ==
Comprising three arches, this red and gold steel arch bridge is said to resemble a giant dragon. The bridge can be used by pedestrians and cyclists.

== Transportation ==
The bridge is accessible west from Minxiong Station of Taiwan Railway.

== See also ==
- List of bridges in Taiwan
- Transportation in Taiwan
