= Beigang, Yunlin =

Urban township in Yunlin, Taiwan

Beigang Township 北港鎮 Hokkō
- Urban township
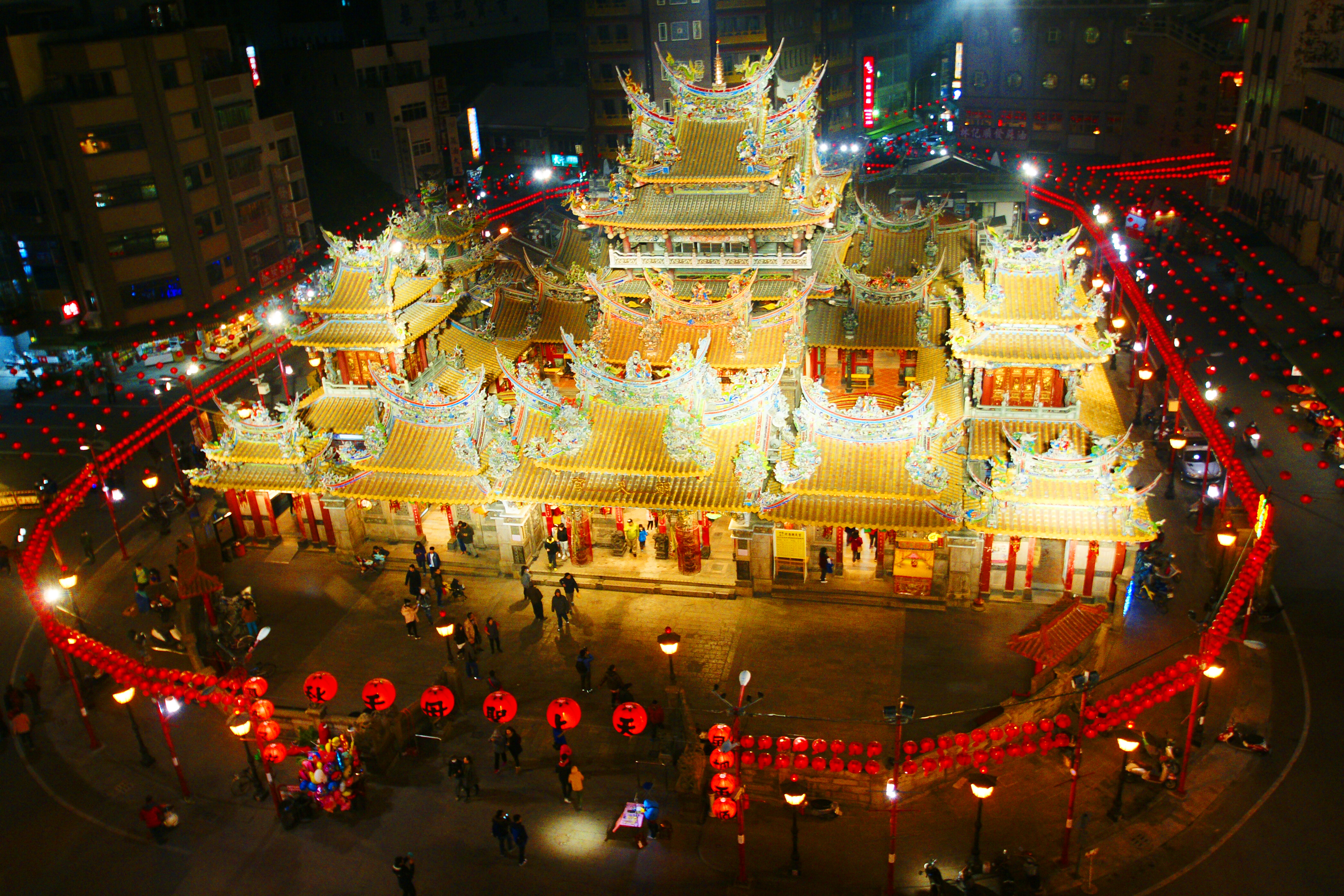
- Street leading to Chaotian Temple

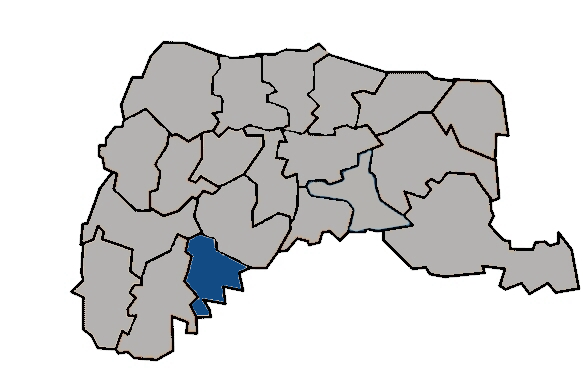
- Beigang Township in Yunlin County

- Location within Taiwan
- Location: Yunlin County, Taiwan

Area
  - Total: 41 km^{2} (16 sq mi)

Population (February 2023)
  - Total: 37,763
  - Density: 920/km^{2} (2,400/sq mi)

Beigang, Yunlin
- Chinese: 北港
- Literal meaning: North Port
Transcriptions
Standard Mandarin
- Hanyu Pinyin: běi gǎng
Southern Min
- Hokkien POJ: Pak-káng

Beigang, Hokkō or Peikang is an urban township in Yunlin County, Taiwan. It is primarily known for its Chaotian Temple, one of the most prominent Temples of Mazu on Taiwan. It has a population of 37,763 as of February 2023.

== Geography ==
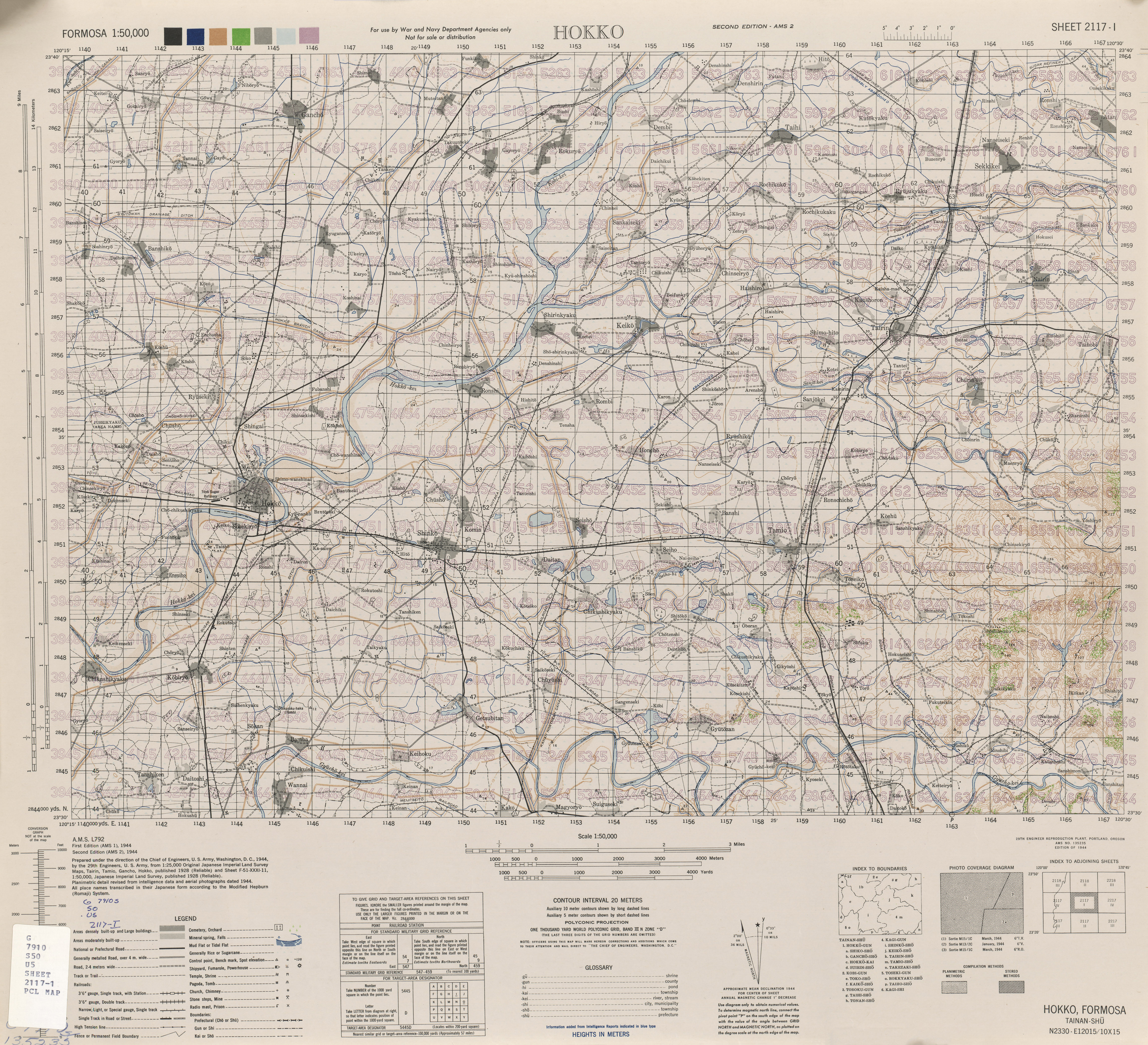
Map including Beigang (labeled as Hokkō) (1944)

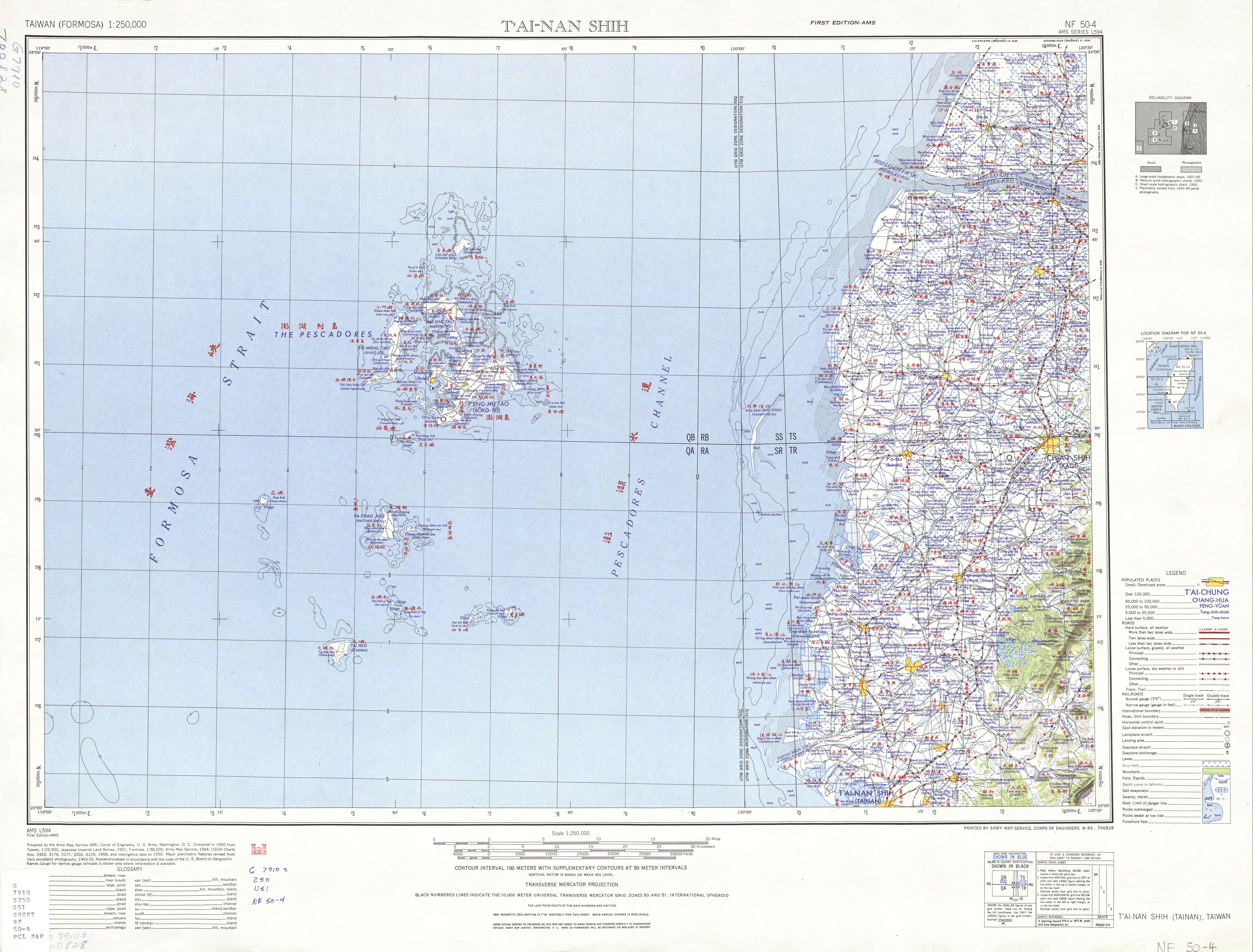
Map including Beigang (labeled as Pei-chiang (Hokkō) 北港) (1950)

The Beigang River borders the town on the east and south.

== History ==
=== Dutch Formosa ===
During the Dutch era, Ponkan (Chinese: 笨港; Pe̍h-ōe-jī: Pùn-káng) was an important coastal castle. In 1621, Pedro Yan Shiqi (顏思齊) from Zhangzhou, Fujian and his forces occupied Ponkan (modern-day Beigang) and started to develop Tsulosan (諸羅山; today's Chiayi City), which grew to become the capital of Tsulo County in 1704.

== Administrative divisions ==
The township comprises 28 villages: Caohu, Dabei, Datong, Fupan, Fuzhao, Gongguan, Gongrong, Gouzao, Guangfu, Guangmin, Haoshou, Hougou, Huasheng, Liucuo, Nanan, Pangou, Renan, Renhe, Shuipu, Shujiao, Sifu, Tunghua, Tungyang, Xincuo, Xinjie, Xishi, Yimin and Zhonghe.

== Education ==
=== Universities ===
The China Medical University has a branch in Beigang.

Beigang is only a short drive (approximately fifteen minutes by car) from National Chung Cheng University, one of Taiwan's foremost research universities.

=== High Schools ===
- National Beigang Senior High School
- National Pei-Kang Agricultural & Industrial Vocational High School
- Jiu Ren High School

=== Junior High Schools ===
- Peikang Junior High School
- Jianguo Junior High School

== Tourist attractions ==
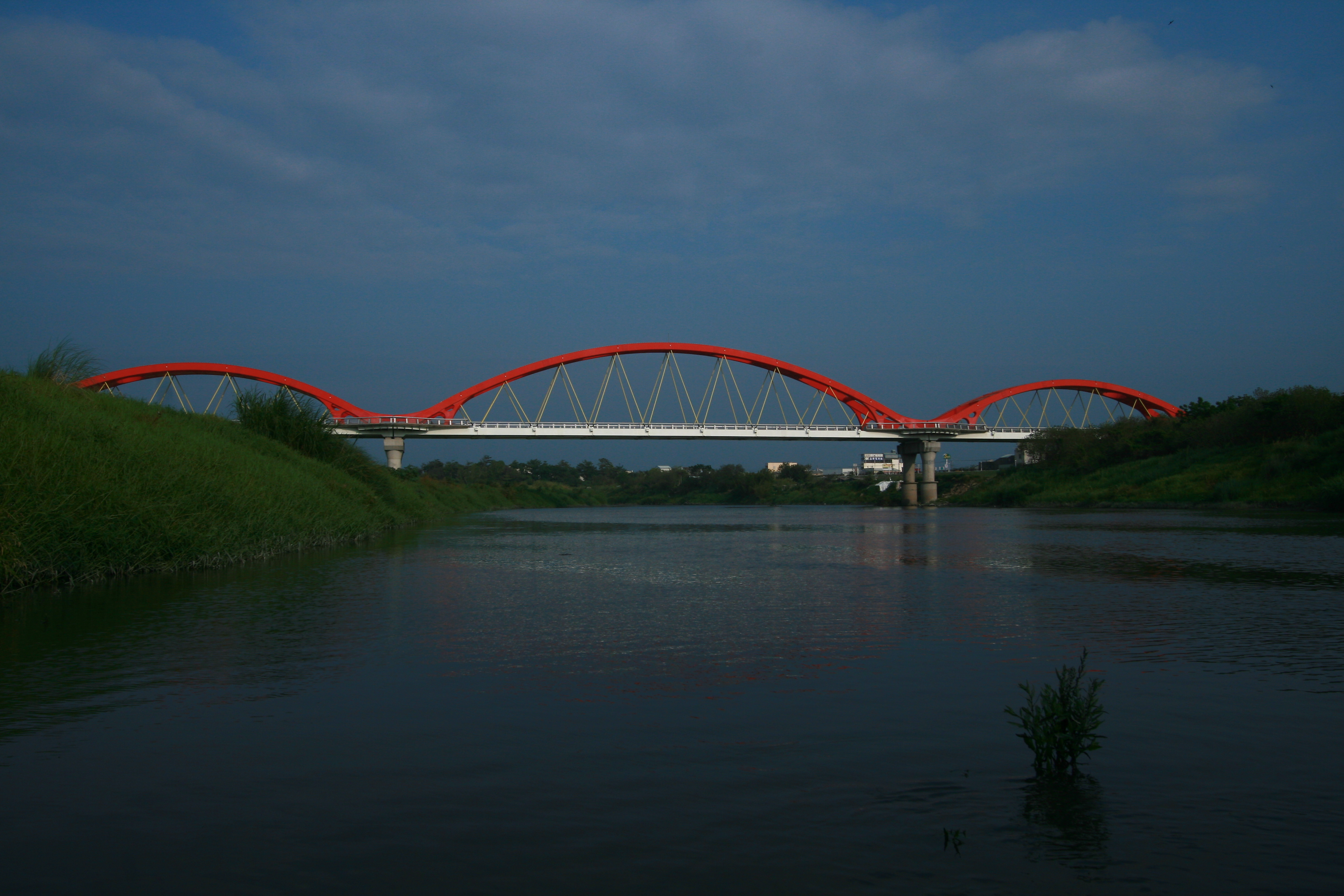
The Beigang Tourist Bridge is 450m long and 6m wide. The three bridge arches are said to resemble the body of a dragon.

- Beigang Sports Park: Beigang Sports Park has a history of 50 years, and was previously a venue for track & field athletics. After renovation, a white sand pit was added for children.
- Zhongshan Road: The old street surrounding Beigang Chaotian Temple, surrounded by many well-known specialty shops and snack bars.
- Nui Hui Morning Market: A gathering place where cows were regularly sold in the morning. Nui Hui Morning Market has a history of more than 100 years and has now become a large vegetable market.
- Beigang Cultural Center
- Beigang Tourist Bridge, connecting the counties of Yunlin and Chiayi, which are separated by the Beigang River.
- Beigang Chaotian Temple, one of the most important Mazu temples in Taiwan and known for its magnificent temple architecture, visited by more than a million pilgrims every year.
- Beigang Wude Temple, one of the largest temple dedicated to Xuan Tan Zhen Jun (玄壇真君), Martial God of Wealth.
- Museum of Beigang Story
- Beigang Water Tower

== Local cuisine specialities ==
- Beigang Wedding Cakes (traditional wedding cakes) are popular souvenirs in Beigang. There are many flavors, both salty and sweet. Many married couples will come to buy wedding cakes, and ordinary tourists will take them home as snacks.
- Peanuts and broad beans

== Cultural activities ==
- Festivities around the birthday of Mazu (23rd day of the third month of the lunar year)
- Baishatun Mazu Pilgrimage
- Beigang International Music Festival

== Transportation ==
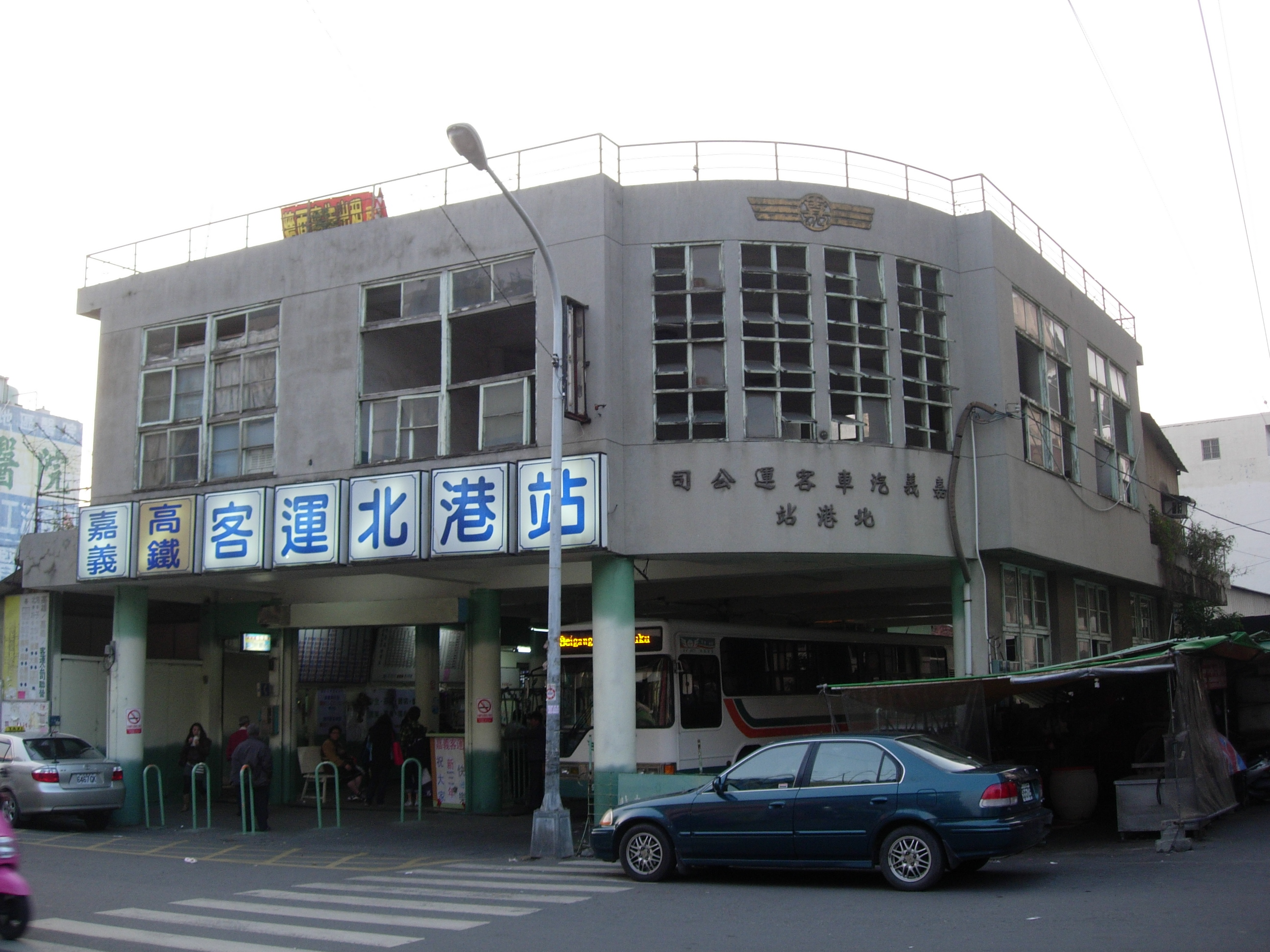
Beigang Bus Station

- Beigang Bus Station

== Notable natives ==
- Alex Tsai, member of Legislative Yuan (2002-2016)
- Su Chih-fen, Magistrate of Yunlin County (2005-2014)
- Wu Se-hwa, Minister of Education (2014-2016)

== Climate ==
Climate data for Beigang, Yunlin (2016–2023 normals, extremes 2016–present)
| Month | Jan | Feb | Mar | Apr | May | Jun | Jul | Aug | Sep | Oct | Nov | Dec | Year |
|---|---|---|---|---|---|---|---|---|---|---|---|---|---|
| Record high °C (°F) | 28.9 (84.0) | 31.7 (89.1) | 31.2 (88.2) | 32.2 (90.0) | 34.6 (94.3) | 34.7 (94.5) | 35.4 (95.7) | 35.3 (95.5) | 35.5 (95.9) | 34.6 (94.3) | 32.1 (89.8) | 29.8 (85.6) | 35.5 (95.9) |
| Mean daily maximum °C (°F) | 21.4 (70.5) | 21.9 (71.4) | 25.0 (77.0) | 27.7 (81.9) | 30.2 (86.4) | 31.8 (89.2) | 32.8 (91.0) | 32.3 (90.1) | 32.2 (90.0) | 30.0 (86.0) | 27.3 (81.1) | 23.0 (73.4) | 28.0 (82.3) |
| Daily mean °C (°F) | 17.0 (62.6) | 17.3 (63.1) | 20.4 (68.7) | 23.5 (74.3) | 26.5 (79.7) | 28.3 (82.9) | 29.1 (84.4) | 28.6 (83.5) | 28.2 (82.8) | 25.6 (78.1) | 22.8 (73.0) | 18.8 (65.8) | 23.8 (74.9) |
| Mean daily minimum °C (°F) | 14.3 (57.7) | 14.5 (58.1) | 17.1 (62.8) | 20.4 (68.7) | 23.7 (74.7) | 25.5 (77.9) | 26.2 (79.2) | 25.9 (78.6) | 25.4 (77.7) | 22.7 (72.9) | 19.9 (67.8) | 16.1 (61.0) | 21.0 (69.8) |
| Record low °C (°F) | 4.7 (40.5) | 8.2 (46.8) | 10.1 (50.2) | 12.6 (54.7) | 15.6 (60.1) | 22.3 (72.1) | 22.6 (72.7) | 23.0 (73.4) | 21.5 (70.7) | 15.7 (60.3) | 12.4 (54.3) | 8.5 (47.3) | 4.7 (40.5) |
| Average precipitation mm (inches) | 33.4 (1.31) | 22.8 (0.90) | 52.5 (2.07) | 67.4 (2.65) | 140.6 (5.54) | 284.5 (11.20) | 138.7 (5.46) | 280.7 (11.05) | 91.8 (3.61) | 19.7 (0.78) | 11.6 (0.46) | 31.1 (1.22) | 1,174.8 (46.25) |
| Average precipitation days | 5.1 | 4.0 | 5.7 | 5.7 | 8.9 | 12.9 | 11.3 | 14.2 | 5.8 | 2.8 | 2.2 | 3.3 | 81.9 |
| Average relative humidity (%) | 81.3 | 80.6 | 79.3 | 79.0 | 81.9 | 82.5 | 80.5 | 83.2 | 79.4 | 78.3 | 80.1 | 78.5 | 80.4 |
Source 1: Central Weather Administration
Source 2: Atmospheric Science Research and Application Databank (precipitation days and humidity 2015–2024)
