= Tongxiao railway station =

Railway station in Miaoli, Taiwan

Tongxiao Station 通霄車站
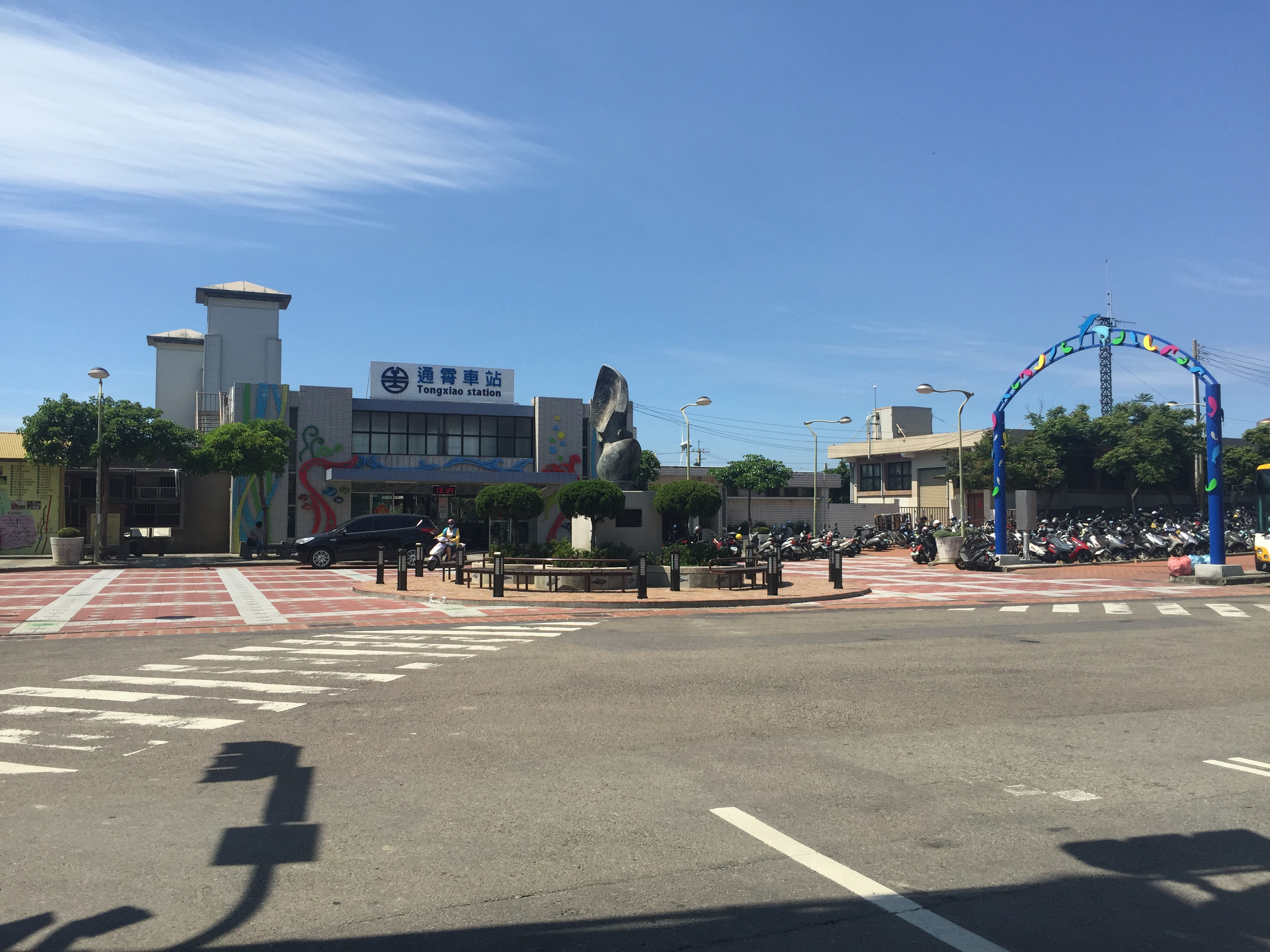

General information
- Location: Tongxiao, Miaoli County, Taiwan
- Coordinates: 24°29′29.4″N 120°40′41.9″E
- System: Train station
- Owner: Taiwan Railway
- Operator: Taiwan Railway
- Line: Western Trunk line
- Train operators: Taiwan Railway

History
- Opened: 11 October 1922

Passengers
- 1,735 daily (2024)
Location

Tongxiao (Chinese: 通霄車站; Hanyu Pinyin: Tōngxiāo Chēzhàn; Tongyong Pinyin: Tongsiao Chejhàn) is a railway station on Taiwan Railway Western Trunk Line (Coastal line) located in Tongxiao Township, Miaoli County, Taiwan.

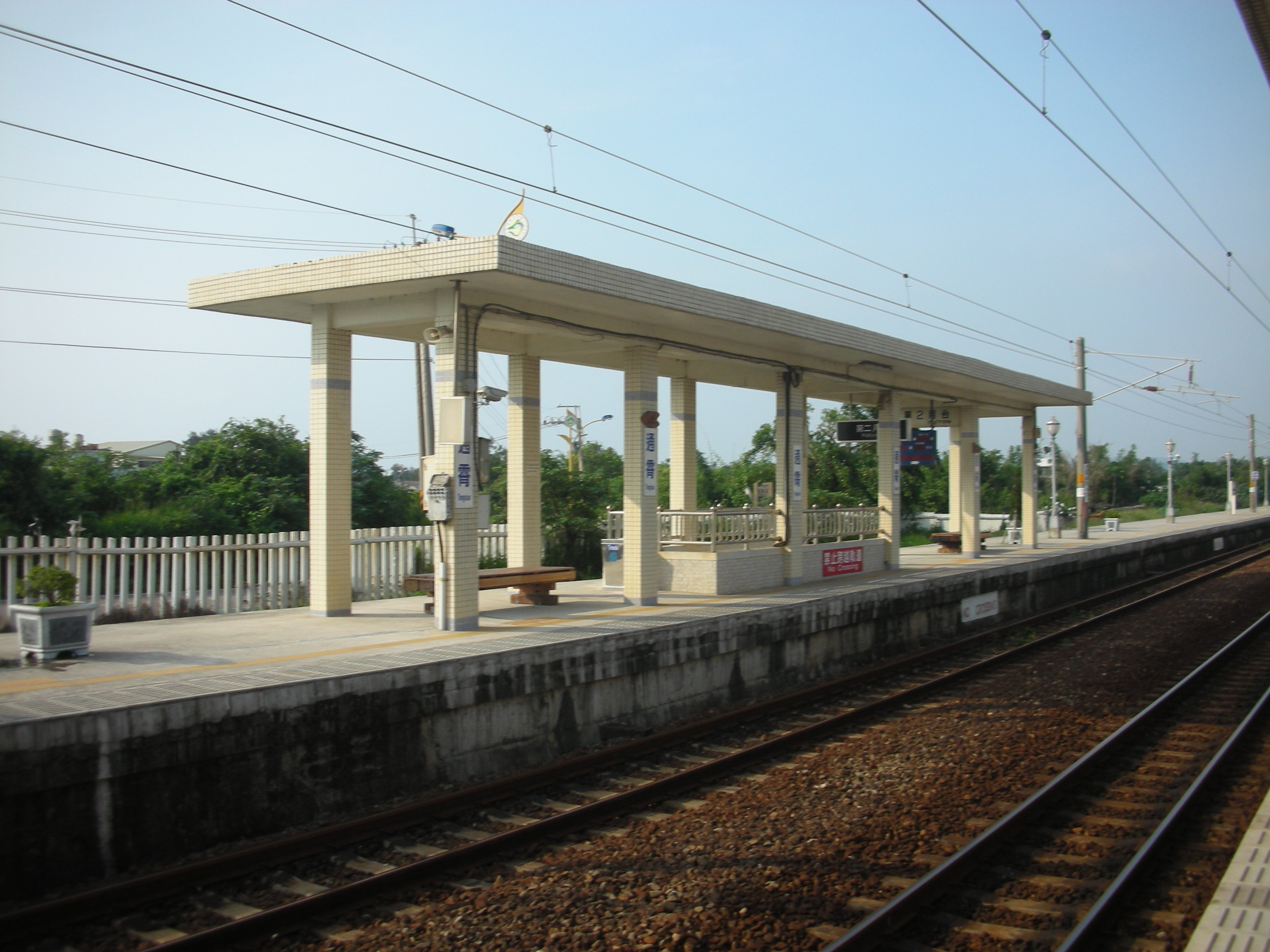
Tongxiao station platform

== History ==
The station was opened on 11 October 1922.

== Around the station ==
- Tongxiao Shrine
- Tunghsiao Power Plant

== See also ==
- List of railway stations in Taiwan

Preceding station	Taiwan Railway	Following station
Xinpu towards Keelung	Western Trunk line	Yuanli towards Pingtung
