= Tongxiao =

Urban township in Miaoli County, Taiwan

Coordinates: 24°29′N 120°41′E

Tongxiao Township 通霄鎮
- Urban township
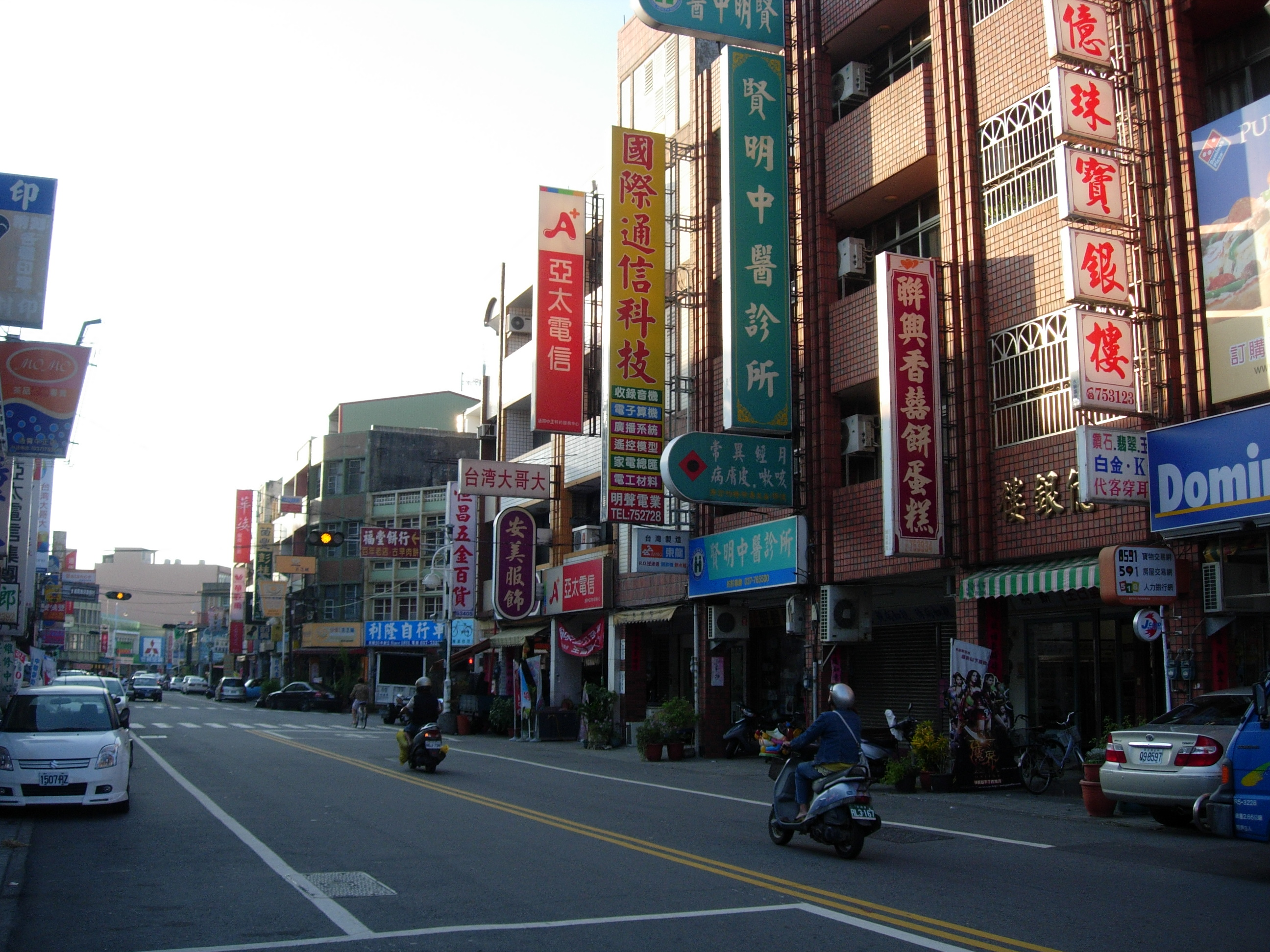

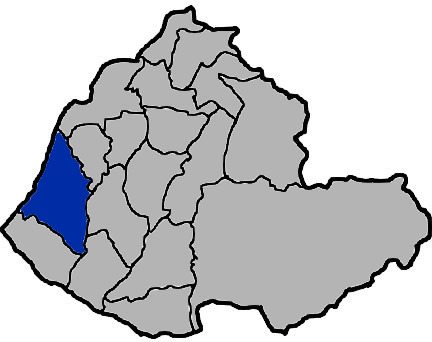
- Tongxiao Township in Miaoli County
- Location: Miaoli County, Taiwan

Area
  - Total: 107.85 km^{2} (41.64 sq mi)

Population (January 2023)
  - Total: 31,799
- Website: www.tungshiau.gov.tw (in Chinese)

Tongxiao Township
- Chinese: 通霄鎮
- Hanyu Pinyin: Tōngxiāo Zhèn
- Wade–Giles: T'ung^{1}-hsiao^{1} Chen^{4}
- Pha̍k-fa-sṳ: Thûng-sêu-chṳ́n
- Hokkien POJ: Thong-siau-tìn

Tongxiao Township is an urban township in southern Miaoli County, Taiwan. It lies between the Taiwan Strait on the west and mountains on the east.

== History ==
The town was formerly called Thunsiau (Chinese: 吞霄; Pe̍h-ōe-jī: Thun-siau).

== Geography ==
- Area: 107.85 square kilometres (41.64 sq mi)
- Population: 31,799 (January 2023 estimate)

== Administrative divisions ==
The township comprises 24 villages: Baitung, Baixi, Chengbei, Chengnan, Fengshu, Fulong, Fuxing, Fuyuan, Meinan, Nanhe, Neidao, Neihu, Pingan, Pingding, Pingyuan, Tongnan, Tongtung, Tongwan, Tongxi, Wubei, Wumei, Wunan, Xinpu and Zuntou.

== Politics ==
The township is part of Miaoli County Constituency I electoral district for Legislative Yuan.

== Tourist attractions ==
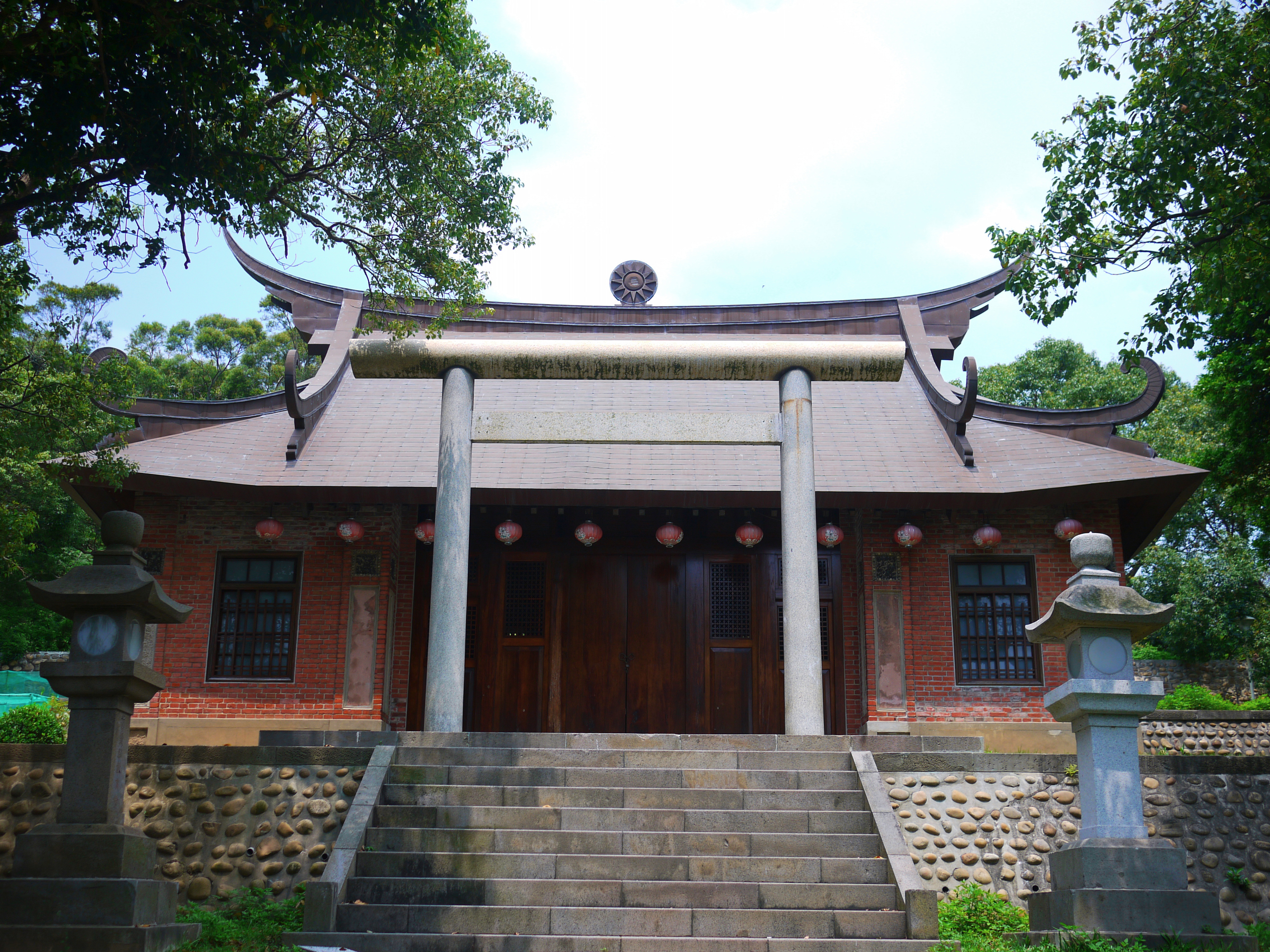
Tongxiao Shrine

- Flying Cow Ranch
- Gongtian Temple
- Taiyen Tongxiao Tourism Factory
- Tongxiao Beach Resort
- Tongxiao Electrodialysis Salt Factory
- Tongxiao Jinja
- Tongxiao Shrine
- Baishatun Mazu Pilgrimage

== Transportation ==
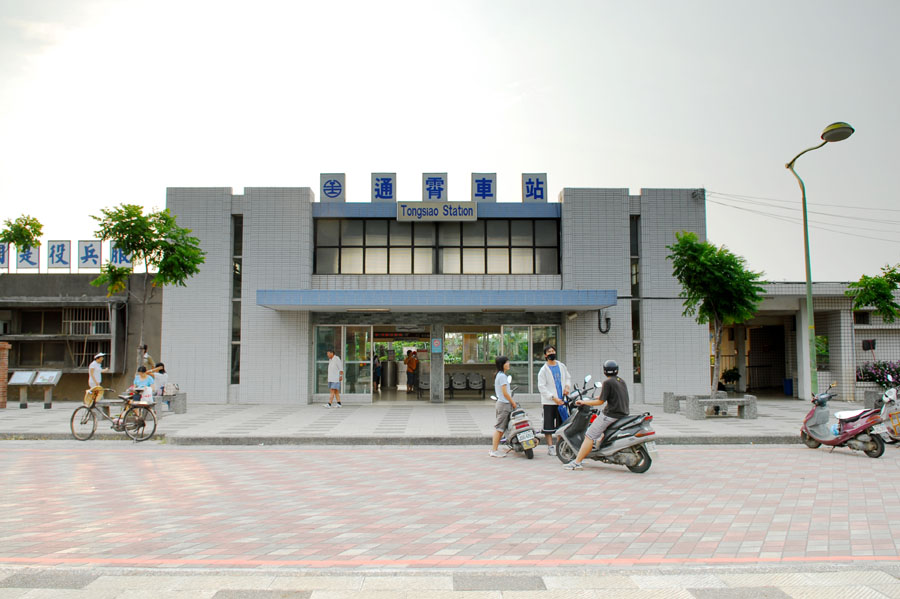
TRA Tongxiao Station

- TR Baishatun Station
- TR Tongxiao Station
- TR Xinpu Station

Taiwan High Speed Rail passes through the central part of the township, but no station is currently planned.

== Notable natives ==
- Ju Ming, sculptor
