= Dajia Mazu Pilgrimage =

Annual religious foot journey in Taiwan

Dajia Mazu Pilgrimage 大甲媽祖遶境進香
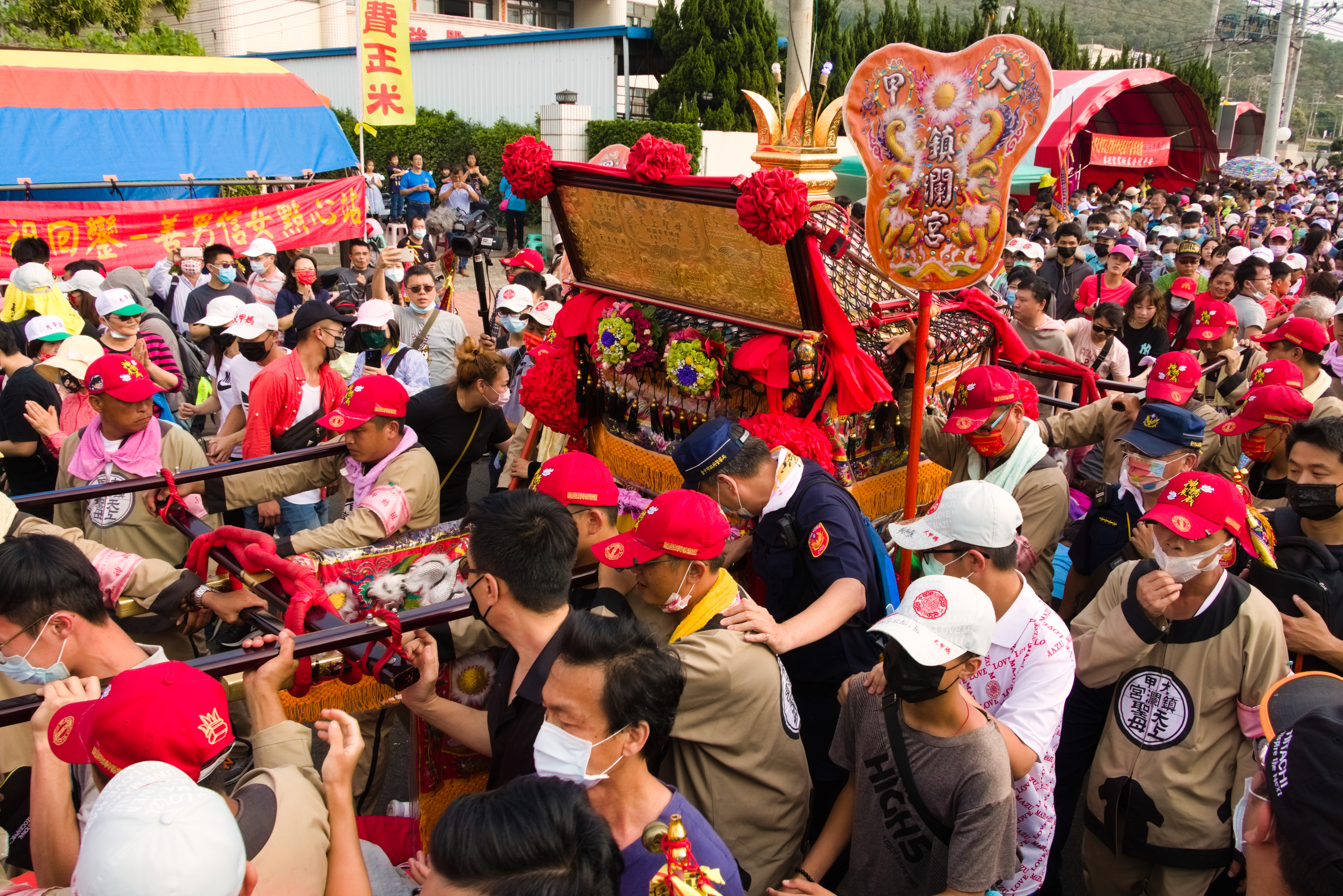
- Mazu's litter, surrounded by pilgrims, en route back to Dajia
- Date: Third month in the Chinese calendar
- Frequency: Annual
- Locations: Between Dajia, Taichung and Xingang, Chiayi
- Country: Taiwan
- Inaugurated: During the reign of Yongzheng Emperor

The Dajia Mazu Pilgrimage is an annual celebration of the Taoist sea goddess Mazu held in Taiwan. During the festival, a statue of Mazu is placed in a litter and carried by foot on a round-trip journey from Jenn Lann Temple in Dajia, Taichung to Fengtian Temple in Xingang, Chiayi, stopping at many more temples along the way. The festival lasts for nine days and attracts large crowds of pilgrims. Every year during the event, the Departments of Environmental Protection from the local counties send many volunteers and cleaners to remove the litter alongside the route.

== History ==
=== Meizhou pilgrimages ===
The pilgrimage began during the reign of Yongzheng Emperor near the temple's founding in 1730 when Lin Yongxing (林永興) migrated from Meizhou Island to Dajia. Lin brought a copy of Mazu from the goddess' original temple, Chaotian Pavilion, and worshipped her at an altar in his home. According to Chinese folk religion, copies of a deity must periodically revisit their predecessor to pay respects and "recharge" their spiritual energy, in a ritual known as jinxiang (進香). For this reason, every twelve years, Lin and other worshippers would travel on boat from Da'an Harbor to Meizhou to pay respects. This pilgrimage used a statue known as sanma (三媽).

In 1895, Taiwan fell under Japanese rule, and the government closed Da'an Harbor to outside trade, which barred Jenn Lann Temple from traveling to Meizhou. The last of these pilgrimages was held in 1899.

=== Beigang pilgrimages ===
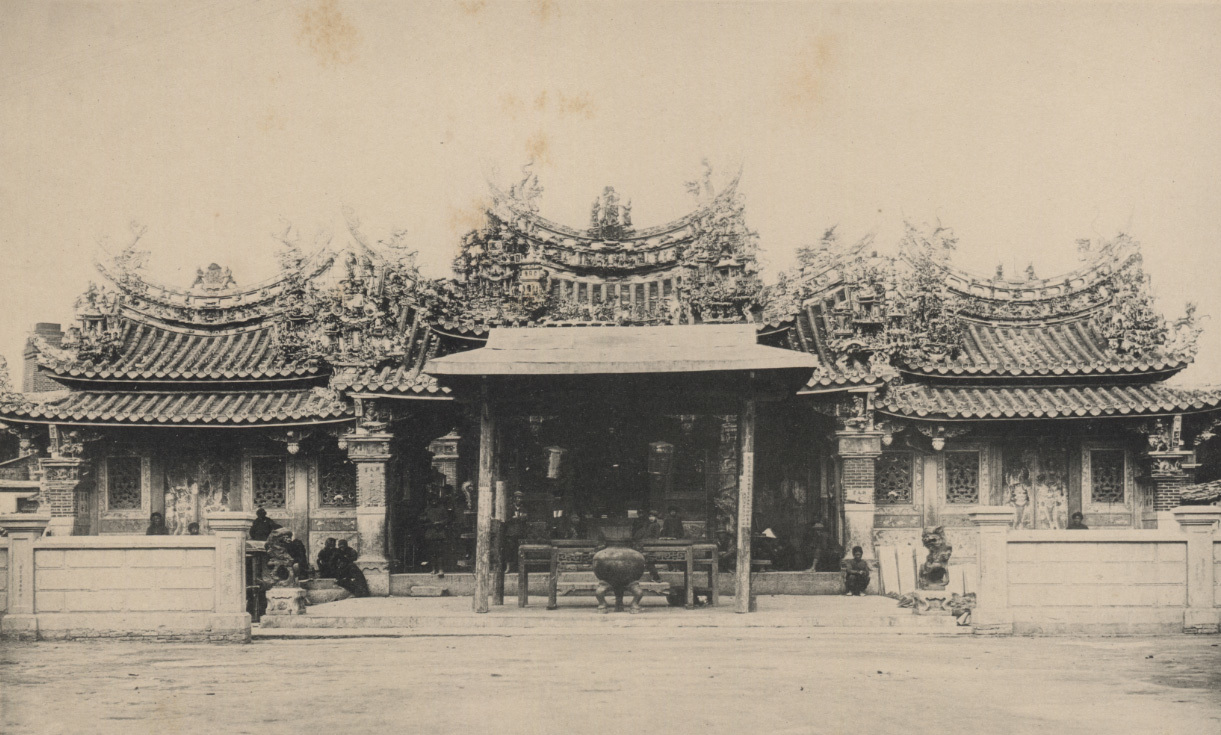
Chaotian Temple as seen during Japanese era.

Historically, Beigang was a major port city and a trading hub for central Taiwan and was frequented by Dajia's merchants. The city's Chaotian Temple was refurbished in 1912 and established itself as the largest Mazu temple in the region. Therefore, in 1914, (Note: The date is inferred from a receipt found at Chaotian Temple.) Jenn Lann Temple made the inaugural trip the larger Chaotian Temple as the next best option for a jinxiang pilgrimage. Initial pilgrimages lasted for seven days, stopping at Changhua and Xiluo for the night in each direction.

Early Beigang pilgrimages were much smaller than today: a journey would only be made every two years, but only if temple officials can fundraise enough money for it, and the entire convoy never exceeded fifty people. Pilgrimages were not held between 1937 and 1946. After 1947, pilgrimages became an annual event and attracted more and more worshippers to the scale today.

According to legend, before the 1962 pilgrimage, a man from Xiluo was traveling through Dajia when his scooter broke down, but nobody helped him in his predicament. Therefore, when the pilgrimage was about to stop in Xiluo for the night, the town's residents only offered non-vegan food to the procession, which the travelers were not allowed to eat. On the return journey, the procession visited Xiluo very briefly and continued to Beidou for the night. Afterwards, Xiluo residents traveled to Jenn Lann Temple to apologize and ask Mazu to come back, but Beidou residents also petitioned for Mazu to stop overnight in their town as well. To satisfy both demands, the pilgrimage was extended from seven days to eight.

In 1974, a documentary film titled The Homecoming Pilgrimage of Dajia Mazu (Note: Film title: 大甲媽祖回娘家, Dàjiǎ Māzǔ Huíniángjiā. The phrase 回娘家 refers to when a woman who married into another family visits her home.) was released by Huang Chun-ming (黃春明). Huang filmed the eight-day trek on 16 mm film and is credited for popularizing the pilgrimage among the public. However, the documentary also introduced the idea that Chaotian Temple is the parent temple of Jenn Lann Temple, which the latter denies. The documentary caused strife between the two temples, and is a major contributing factor to the pilgrimage's route change in 1988.

=== 1987 Meizhou pilgrimage ===
In 1987, Meizhou's Chaotian Pavilion invited all Mazu temples to visit for the 1,000 year anniversary of Mazu worship. To circumvent martial law restrictions on travel to the mainland, Jenn Lann Temple officials decided to visit in secret by transferring through Osaka, making them the first Taiwanese temple to visit mainland China in the ROC era. While in Meizhou, Jenn Lann Temple officials brought back a new copy of Mazu's statue back to Taiwan. Their plan was discovered and reported by a Taiwanese magazine, where it became highly controversial in Taiwan, but also inspired other Taiwanese temples to do the same.

=== Xingang pilgrimages ===
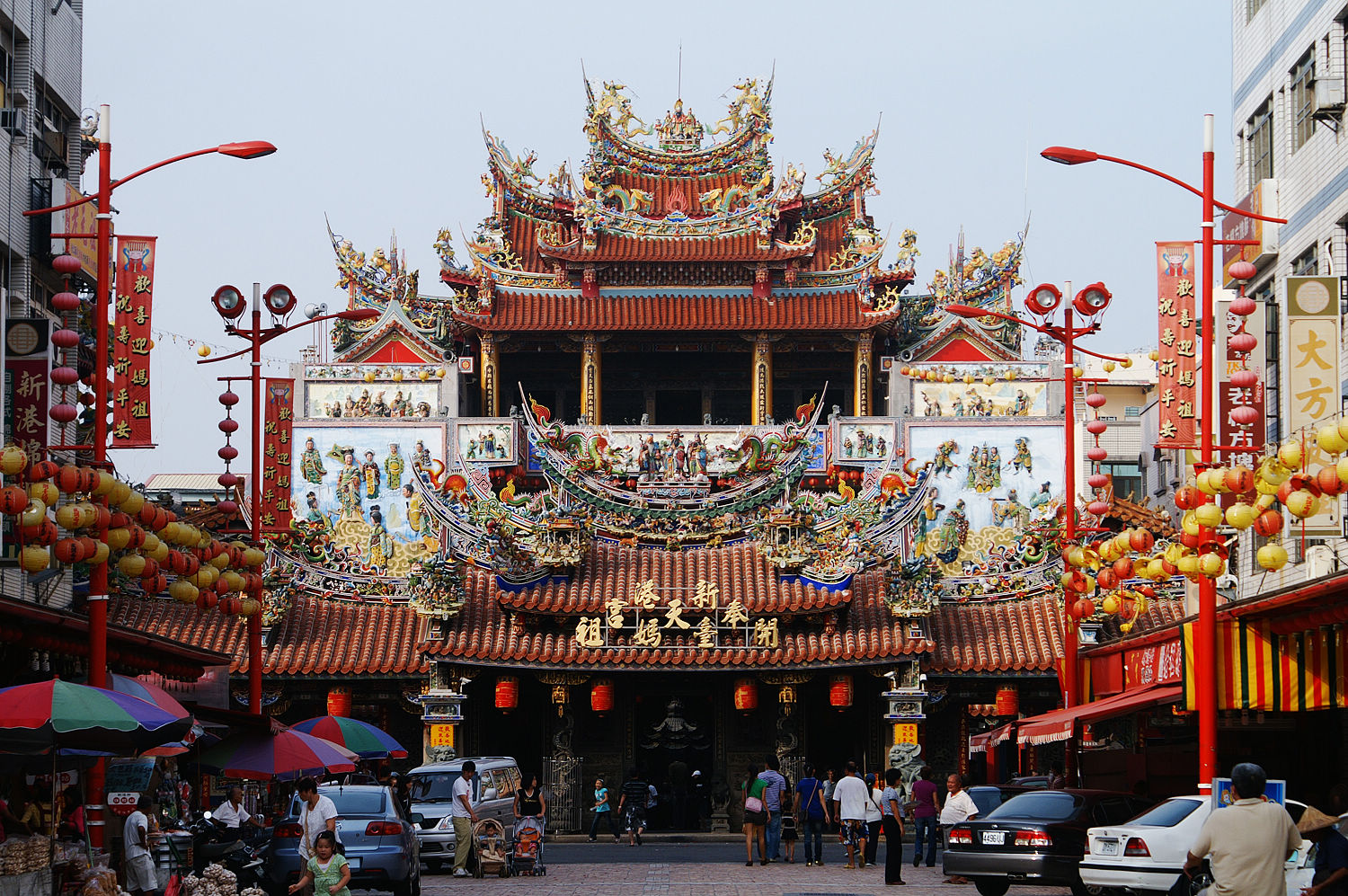
Fengtian Temple, the current destination of the pilgrimage.

With the new Mazu statue, Jenn Lann Temple was able to reinforce their claim that Chaotian Pavilion in mainland China, instead of Chaotian Temple in Beigang, was their parent temple. For the 1988 pilgrimage, they decided to call the event a raojing (遶境) instead of a jinxiang, which means that the Dajia Mazu is bringing its blessings, instead of paying tribute, to the Beigang Mazu. This move angered Chaotian Temple officials, who considered the Dajia Mazu to be overstepping its jurisdiction. When it was decided that the pilgrimage would arrive on Lantern Festival, Chaotian Temple announced that they were unable to welcome the visitors since they would be holding their own raojing event.

Upon hearing the news, Fengtian Temple in nearby Xingang petitioned to Jenn Lann Temple to visit them instead. Fengtian Temple claims to be the true successor to the original Mazu temple in Beigang, which was destroyed in a flood in 1809, and this stance put them at odds with Chaotian Temple. Jenn Lann Temple agreed to the proposal, and after officially severing relations with Chaotian Temple, the 1988 pilgrimage ended in Xingang instead.

In 2010, the pilgrimages added Qingshui as an overnight stop since festivities in Changhua often delayed the procession.

== Traditions ==
Worshippers in Jenn Lann temple during the return ceremony

Before the procession departs, a ceremony known as jiaogao (筊筶) is held at Jenn Lann Temple, where the pilgrimage's start date through poe divination. Afterwards, the procession's Head Banner is tied onto the left dragon pillar of the temple, rectangular pieces of paper known as a xiangtiao (香條) are passed along the route to notify people about the upcoming pilgrimage, and subordinate temples decide among themselves which order to travel inside the procession.

The day before the pilgrimage, a ceremony known as qi'an (祈安) is held at Jenn Lann Temple to ask for a safe journey, and Mazu is invited to board the litter. The litter contains three statues of Mazu: zhengluma (正爐媽), fuluma (副爐媽), and meizhouma (湄洲媽). During the pilgrimage, Mazu litter is carried by eight men and travels near the end of the procession, behind the crier, flag bearers, musicians, and convoys from other temples.

Pilgrims often follow a vegetarian diet for the duration of the pilgrimage, and food is provided for passing pilgrims by the villages along the way. In Xingang, Mazu is moved onto Fengtian Temple's altar, and a ceremony is held to celebrate the goddess' birthday and wish for good luck.

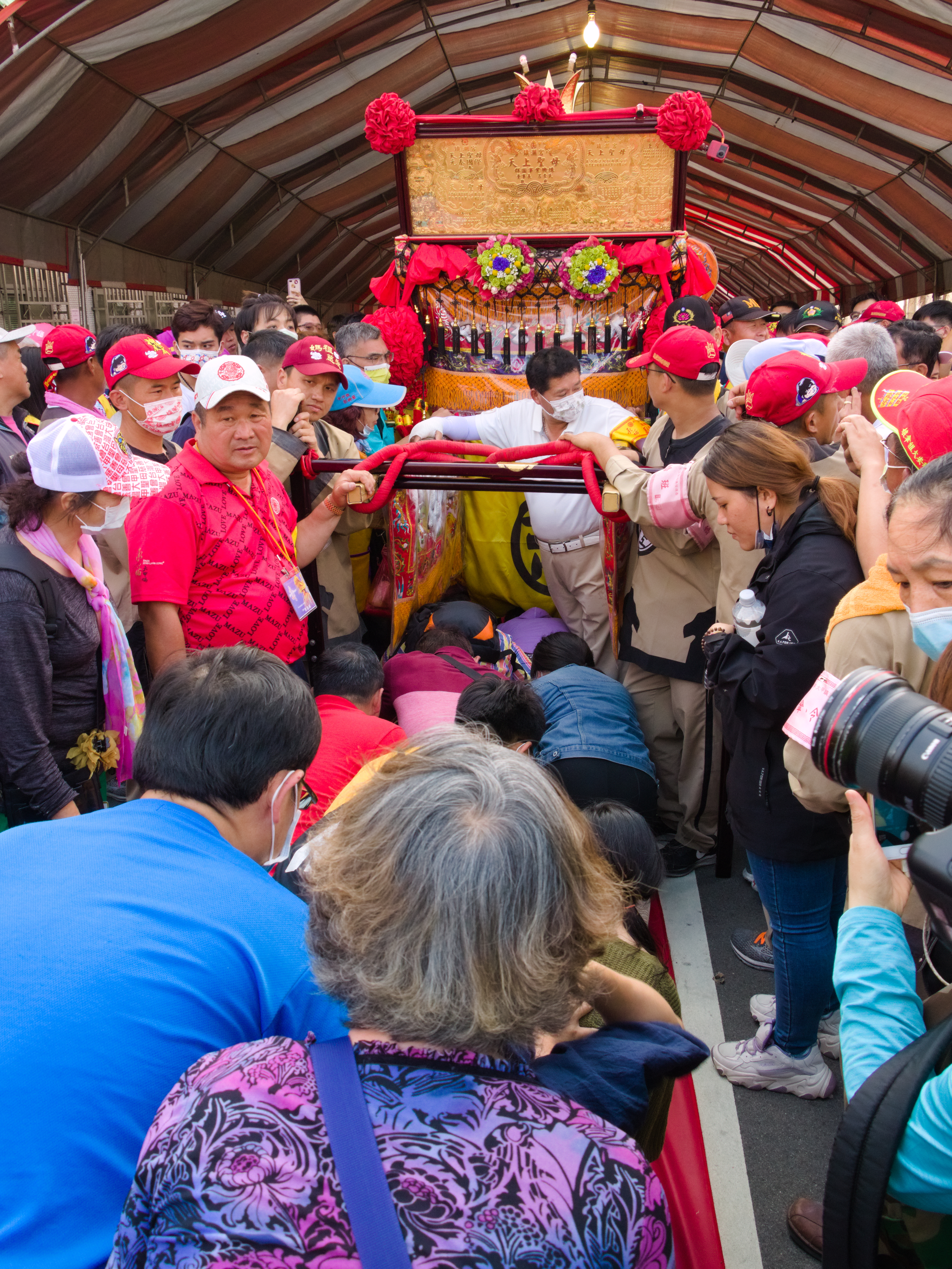
Worshippers crawling underneath the litter

The kneeling ritual (Chinese: 鑽轎腳; Pe̍h-ōe-jī: nǹg-kiō-kha) is a common practice among Mazu processions. Worshipers may either kneel on the ground for the litter to travel over them or crawl underneath a stationary litter. Originally used to show gratitude towards Mazu, worshippers may also kneel to ask for protection and good luck.

=== Route ===
The Dajia Mazu Pilgrimage follows the a predetermined route to Xingang, which differs from the Baishatun Mazu Pilgrimage, where the route is decided on the way. The temples that Mazu stays the night is as follows:

Day	Location	Temple
1	Changhua	Nanyao Temple
2	Xiluo	Fuxing Temple
3	Xingang	Fengtian Temple
4	Xingang	Fengtian Temple
5	Xiluo	Fuxing Temple
6	Beidou	Dian'an Temple
7	Changhua	Tianhou Temple
8	Qingshui	Chaoxing Temple
9	Dajia	Jenn Lann Temple

=== Stealing the litter ===
Since Dajia Mazu is considered to be very powerful, temples along the route would often try to "steal" some of Mazu's power, which is believed to be inside the incense that is carried. Spiritual power may be "stolen" by others if the incense is surrounded by foreign banners and magical writing. In early pilgrimages, there was a twelve-person convoy holding an incense carrier who travelled in secret to avoid losing the spiritual power in the crowd. However, in 1987, the convoy was intercepted by a temple in Qingshui who tried to redirect them to their temple, so Jenn Lann Temple abolished the convoy in later pilgrimages.

In modern times, temples that Mazu doesn't visit will sometimes send people to surround the litter and forcefully ask them to make a detour to their temple. In most cases, the litter bearers concede to these requests in order to avoid conflicts. However, violent brawls do occur if the two sides do not come to an agreement. Therefore, the procession is often accompanied by a large police presence to discourage litter stealing.
