= Fengtian =

Fengtian (Chinese: 奉天; pinyin: Fèngtiān; Wade–Giles: Feng t'ien; postal: Fengtien; Manchu: Abkai imiyangga fu) is:

奉天 (lit 'by the grace of Heaven') in Liaoning

Fengtian is a specific historic term in Chinese mainly to describe the Province of Liaoning and its capital, Shenyang, during the Qing dynasty (1644-1911), Republic of China's mainland era (1912-49), and Manchukuo (1932-1945). In Western literature, the equivalent term is Mukden (lit. 'the capital where the dynasty got flourished'), although they are not exactly the same word in Chinese.

- Shenyang, largest city and provincial capital of Liaoning province, which was formerly administered under Fengtian Fu, which was abolished in 1910
- Fengtian Province, the province formerly named Fengtian from 1907 to 1929; under the Manchukuo regime, the name was revived, but again abolished in 1945.
- Fengtian clique, a group of warlord factions during the Republic of China's warlord era

奉天 in other places

- Fengtian Temple, Mazu temple in Xingang, Chiayi County, Taiwan
- Fengtian County, the name of Qian County from 7th to 13th century

枫田 (lit. 'maple field')

- Fengtian, Jiangxi (枫田镇), a town in Anfu County, Jiangxi

丰田 (lit. 'prolific field')

- Fengtian, Inner Mongolia (丰田镇), a town in Tongliao City, Inner Mongolia
- Fengtian, Fujian (丰田镇), a town in Nanjing County, Fujian
- Fengtian, Xinning (丰田乡), a township of Xinning County, Hunan

== See also ==
- Shuntian (disambiguation)
- Guangci–Fengtian Temple metro station, a metro station of the Taipei Metro
