= Bengang Tianhou Temple =

Temple in Chiayi County, Taiwan

Tianhou Temple
- 天后宮
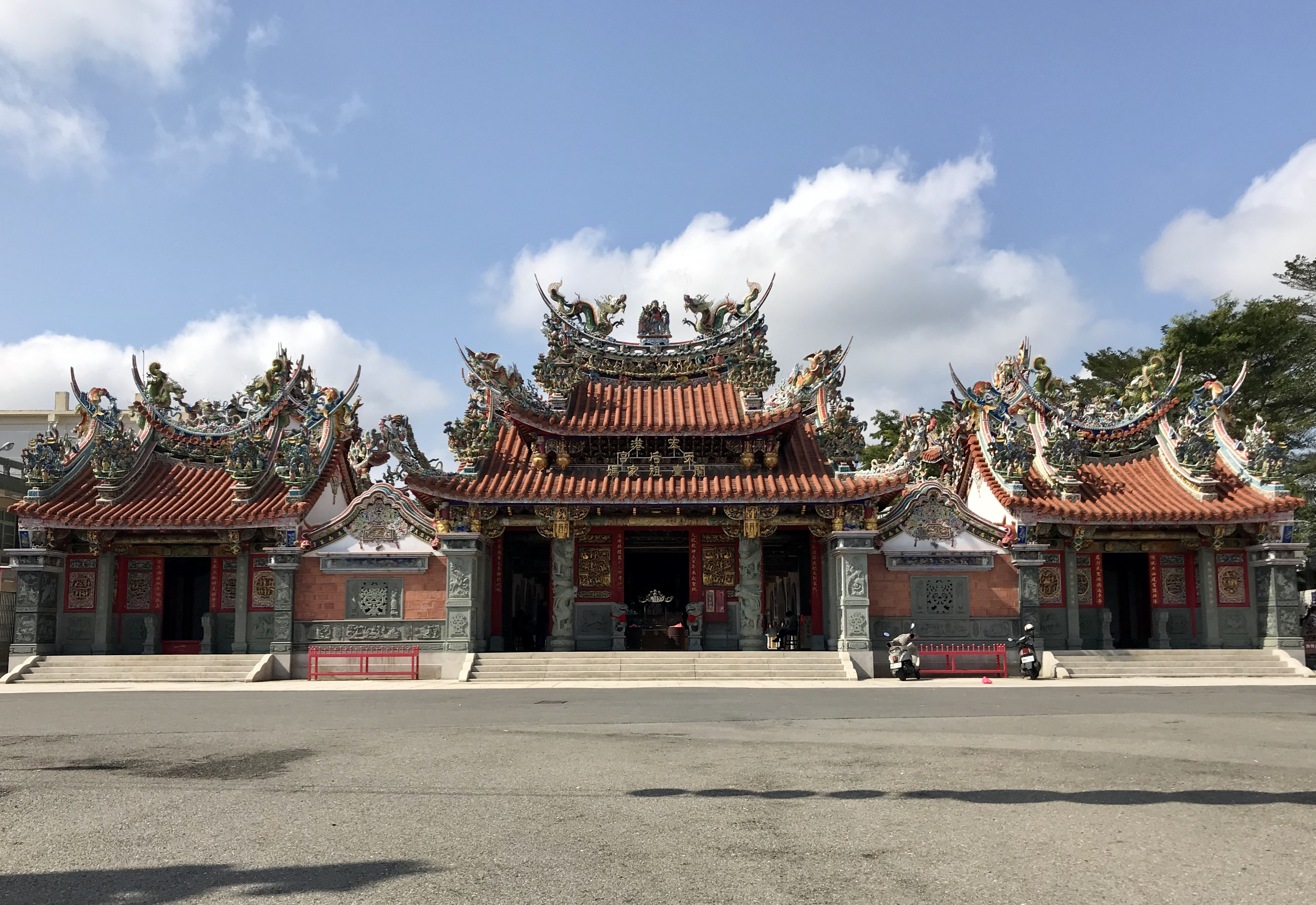

Religion
- Affiliation: Taoism
- Deity: Mazu

Location
- Location: Xingang, Chiayi
- Country: Taiwan
- Interactive map of Tianhou Temple
- Coordinates: 23.5616°N 120.3081°E

Architecture
- Groundbreaking: 1998
- Completed: 2002
- Direction of façade: East

Bengang Tianhou Temple (Chinese: 笨港天后宮; pinyin: Bèngǎng Tiānhòu Gōng) is a temple located in Nangang Village, Xingang Township, Chiayi County, Taiwan. Sitting on the south shore of the Beigang River, the temple is dedicated to Mazu, Goddess of Sea.

== History ==
In 1713, a temple named "Mazu Temple" was built in Bengang (current day Beigang, Yunlin and Nangang Village) east of the current location. Sometime later, a potter named Yang Qian (楊謙) moved from Bengang to Changhua in search of work. According to legend, the incense bag that he carried with him for spiritual protection began glowing, which the people of Changhua believed that Goddess Mazu had revealed herself miraculously. Therefore, Changhua's Nanyao Temple was built in 1738 and dedicated to Goddess Mazu.

Some time afterwards, Yang Qian moved back to Bengang near Shuixian Temple. In 1815, Nanyao Temple began the tradition of making a pilgrimage to the Yang residence to pay tribute to their origins. Yang Qian's descendants thought that a deity visiting a mortal was strange, so they asked Nanyao Temple to sculpt a Mazu statue for them, which they stored in Mazu Temple (at this time renamed as Tianhou Temple). Later, the Yang family fell into financial trouble, so during the pilgrimage, Nanyao Temple would replace the clothes on the statue.

The 1906 Meishan earthquake destroyed Tianhou Temple, so the statue was moved to the Yang residence, where the tradition continued. Towards the end of World War II, the men in the Yang family were drafted by the Imperial Japanese Army and all died in combat. Since no one could take care of the Mazu statue, the statue was moved to Shuixian Temple where the ceremonies continued.

In 1998, worshippers bought a tract of land directly adjacent to Shuixian Temple to rebuild Tianhou Temple. The new temple measured 420 ping and took five years to complete. The temple was built using traditional methods: notably, the carpenter was the son of the carpenter that helped renovate Shuixian Temple. On 10 October 2002, a ceremony was held to move the Mazu statue from Shuixian Temple, and future pilgrimages from Nanyao Temple ended at the new Tianhou Temple.

== See also ==
- Qianliyan & Shunfeng'er
- Chaotian Temple, Yunlin County
- Nanyao Temple
- Fengtian Temple
- List of Mazu temples around the world
- List of temples in Taiwan
