= Shuixian Temple =

Shuixian Temple may refer to the following in Taiwan:

- Bengang Shuixian Temple, in Xingang Township, Chiayi County
- Penghu Shuixian Temple, in Magong City, Penghu County
