= Bah-uân =

Taiwanese street food

Bah-oân
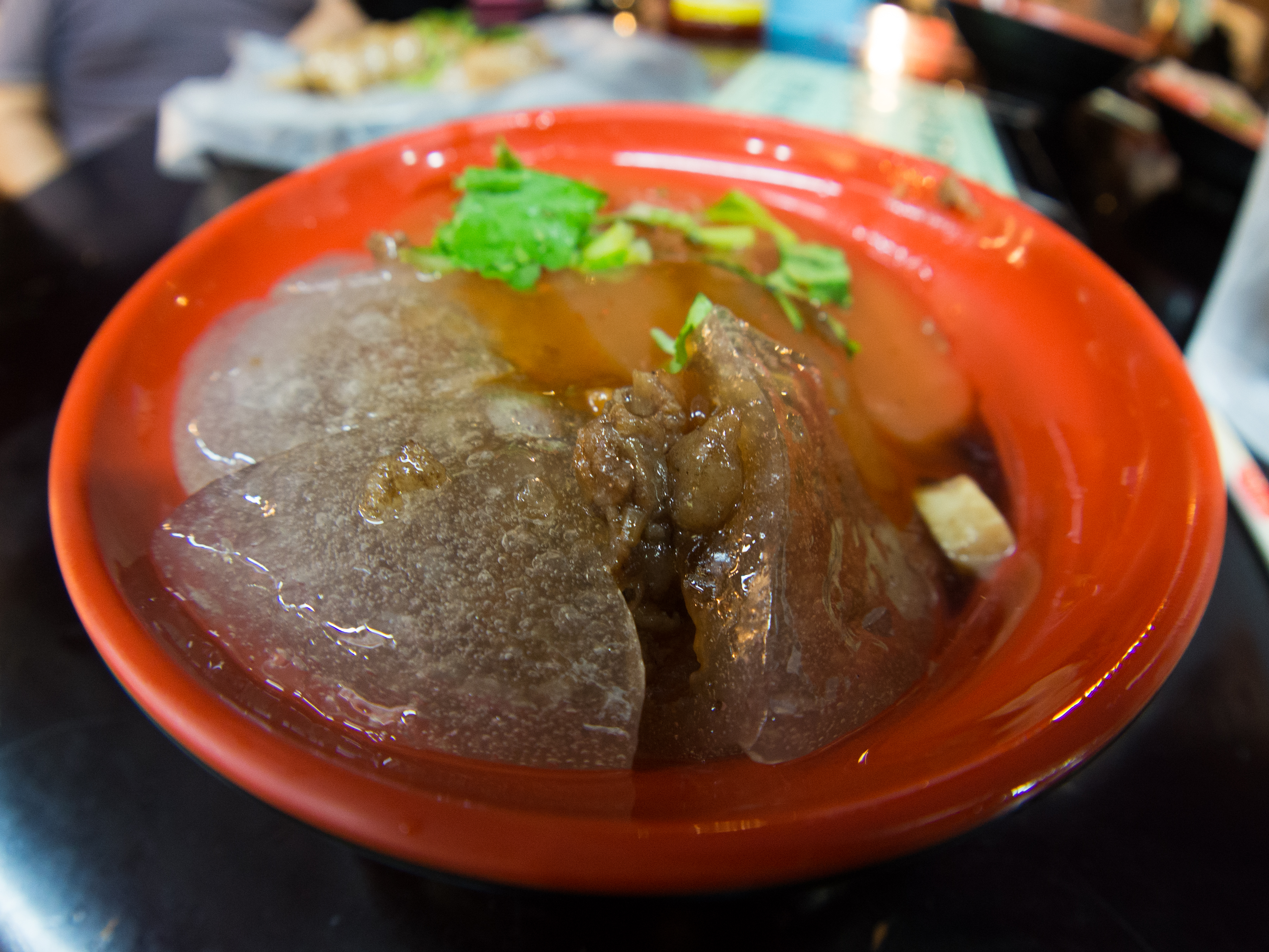
- Bawan from Taoyuan, Taiwan
- Type: Dumpling
- Course: Dim sum
- Place of origin: Taiwan
- Main ingredients: Dough (corn starch, sweet potato starch, rice flour), pork, chicken, bamboo shoots, shiitake mushrooms

Bah-uân
- Traditional Chinese: 肉圓
- Literal meaning: meat circle
Transcriptions
Standard Mandarin
- Hanyu Pinyin: ròuyuán
Southern Min
- Hokkien POJ: bah-oân
- Tâi-lô: Bah-uân

Bah-uân (Note: Chinese: 肉圓; Pe̍h-ōe-jī: bah-oân; Tâi-lô: bah-uân; pinyin: ròuyuán; lit. 'meat circle') is a Taiwanese dumpling made of starch and rice flour, filled with meat and vegetables. It is gelatinous and translucent, and often considered street food.

== Names ==
The alternative term "ba-wan" is a non-standard romanization derived from Taiwanese Hokkien. In the township of Lukang, Changhua County, ba-wan are known as bahhoe (肉回; ròuhuí; bah-hôe; 'meat return') because they take on the block-like shape of the character 回.

== History ==
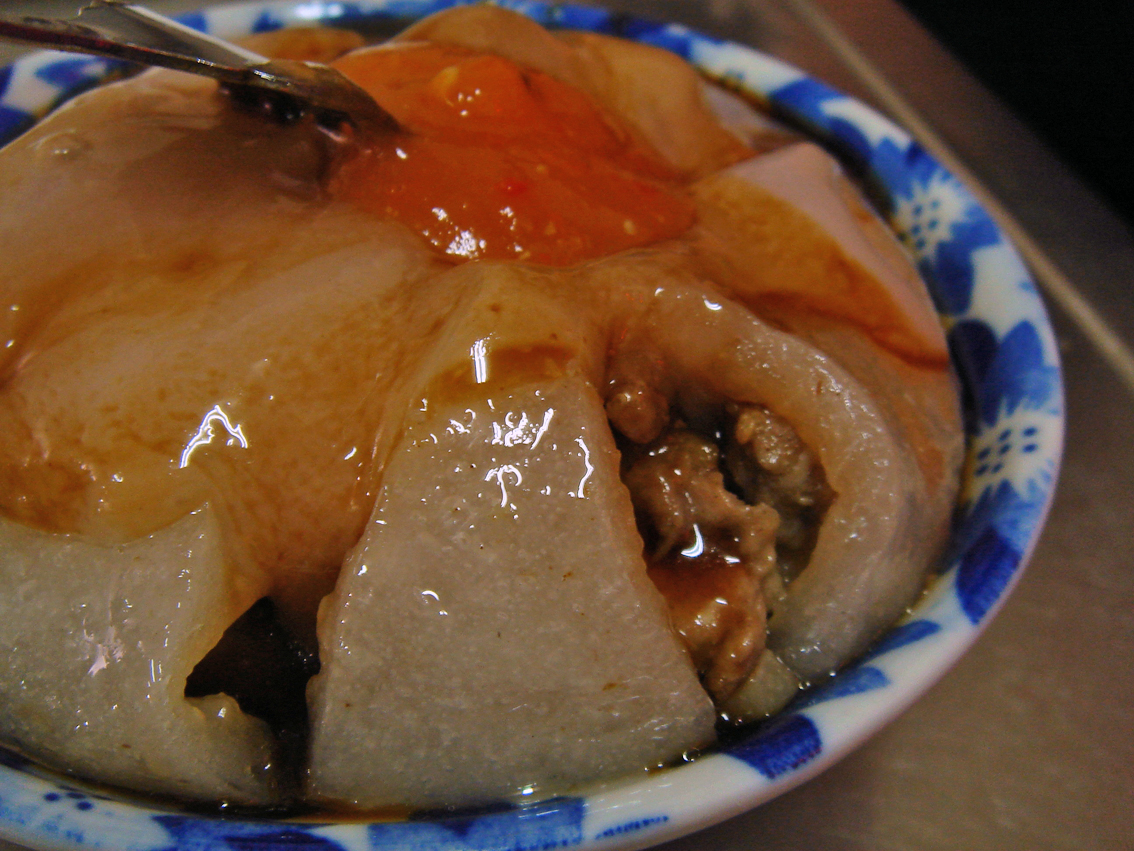
Bawan with meat filling

It is believed that ba-wan were first prepared in the Beidou township of Changhua County by a scribe by the name of Fan Wan-chu (范萬居; Fàn Wànjū) as food for disaster relief, when the region was struck by heavy floods in 1898. Since then, ba-wan has spread to different regions of Taiwan and is now considered by many as a national food, and can be found in most night markets in Taiwan. The traditional wrapper was made with sweet potato starch alone, sweet potatoes were the dominant food crop in pre-1950s Taiwan and were traditionally preserved by extracting their starch. The ingredients of the ba-wan reflect the terroir of Taiwan.

== Production ==
The ba-wan is a disk-shaped translucent dough 6–8 cm (2.4–3.1 in) diameter made of sweet potato starch filled with savory stuffing and served with sweet and savory sauce. The stuffing varies widely according to different regions in Taiwan, but usually consists of a mixture of pork, bamboo shoots, and shiitake mushrooms. Changhua-style ba-wan is considered to be the "standard" ba-wan as it is the most famous and most widely imitated of all styles of ba-wan.

The gelatinous dough is made of a combination of corn starch, sweet potato starch, and rice flour, which gives it its chewy, sticky, and gelatinous texture (sometimes described as "Q" in Taiwanese parlance) and a greyish translucent hue. Ba-wan are initially cooked by steaming; however, they may also be served after being deep fried to give them a "skin" or gently poached in oil to heat them without drying them out. Their form makes them relatively easy to pre-make and store. They can be quickly heated again in oil before serving.

== Gallery ==
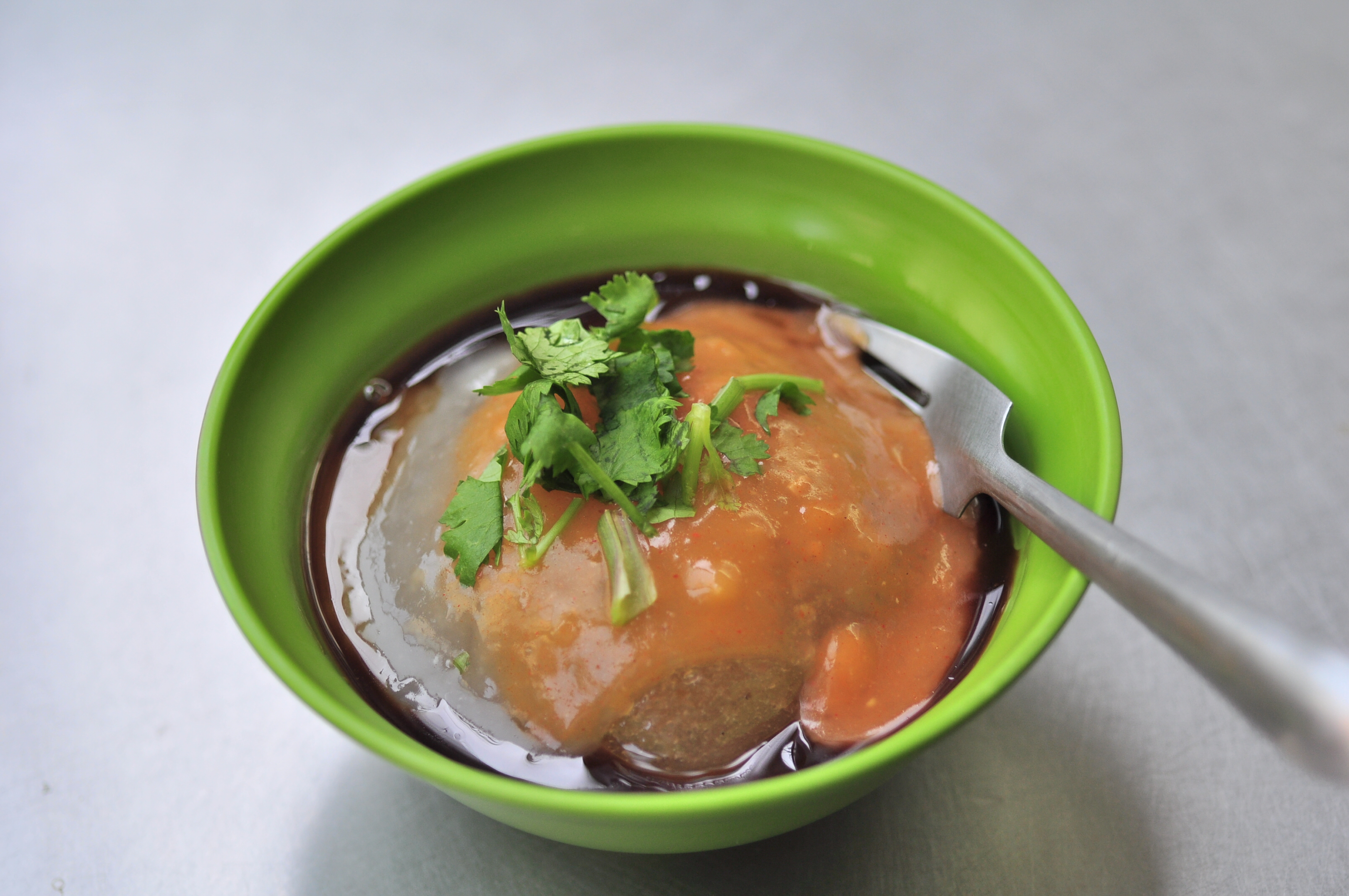

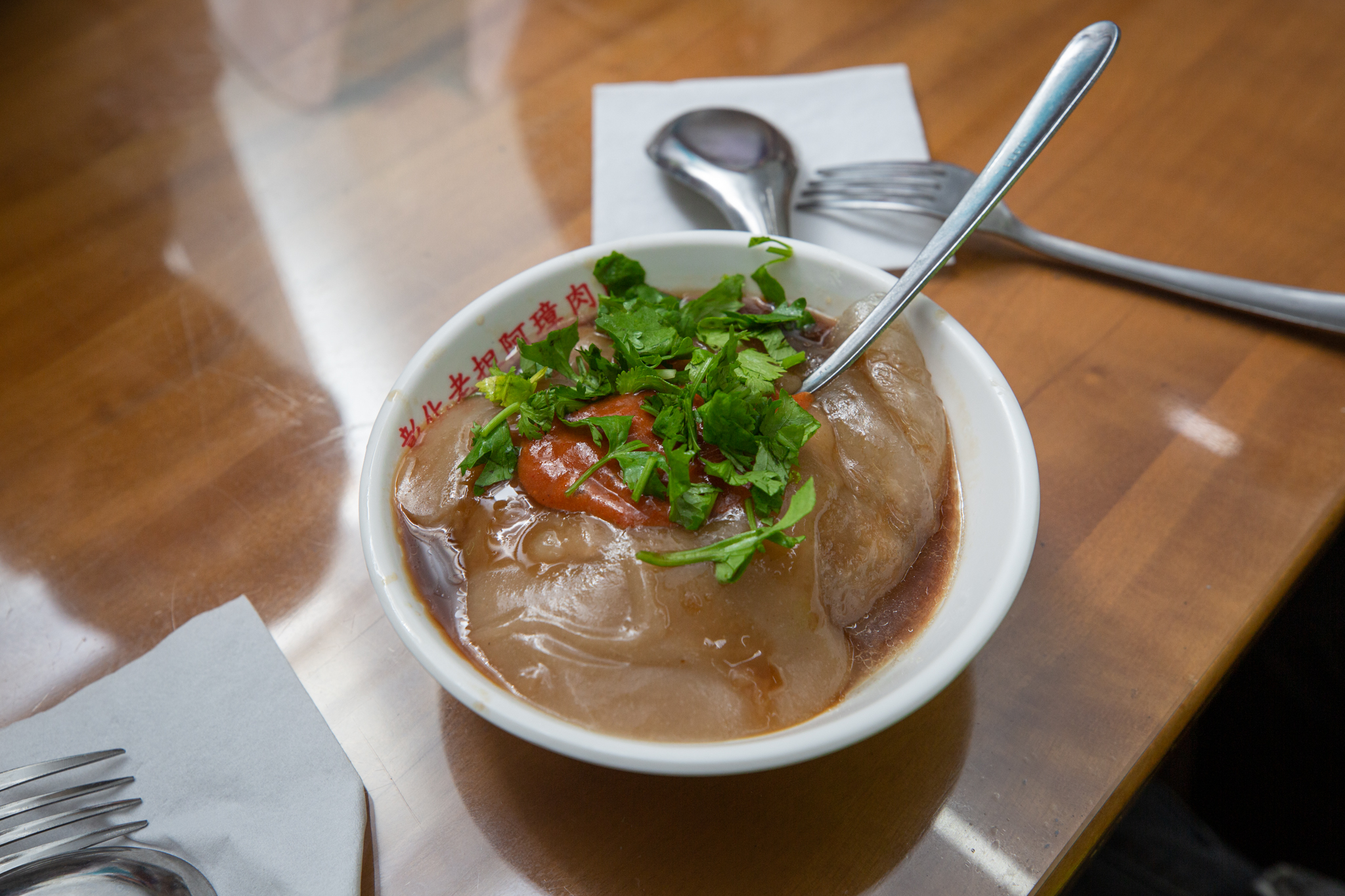

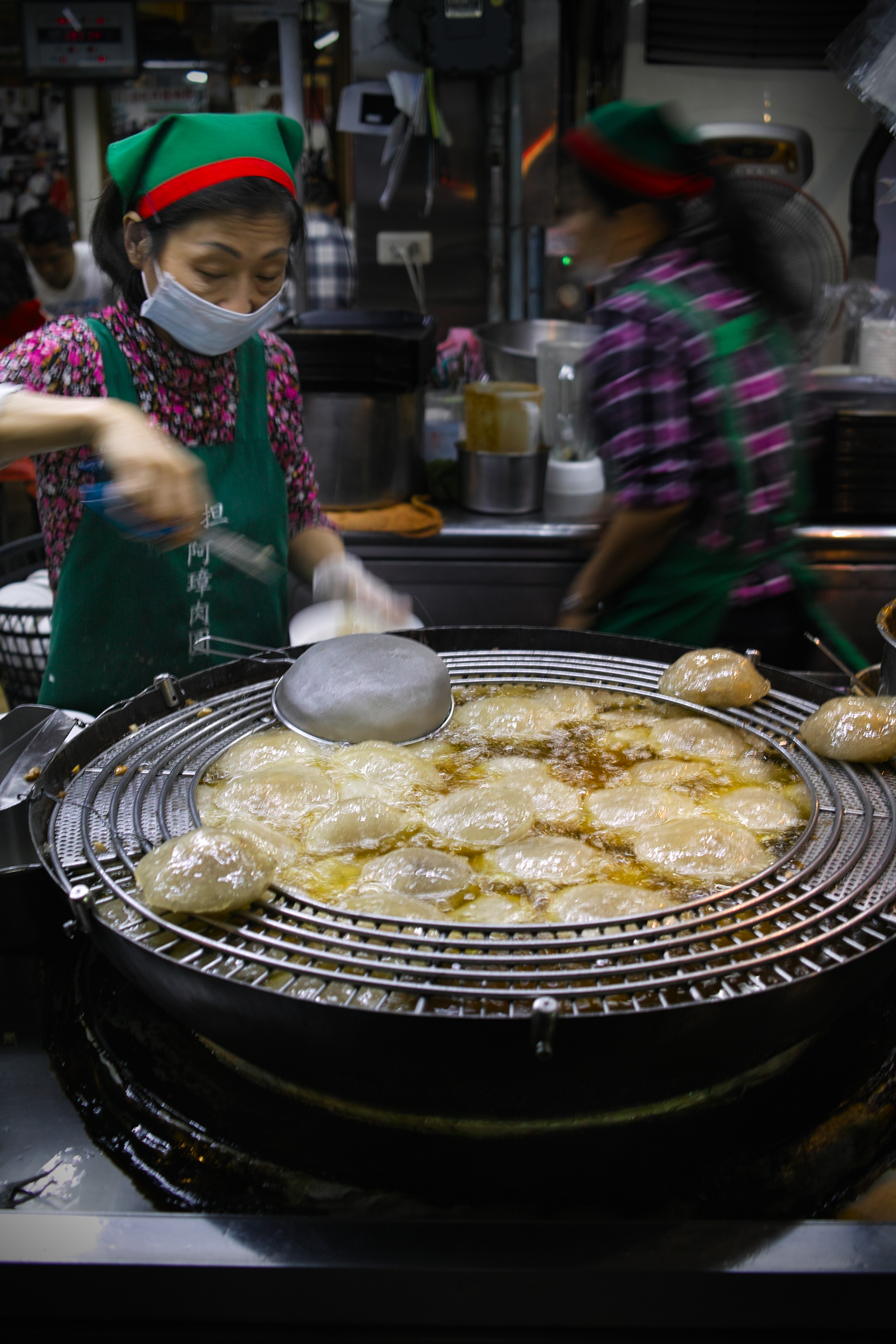
Frying bawan

== See also ==
- Bakso
- Cepelinai
- List of dumplings
- Taiwanese cuisine
