= Bengang Shuixian Temple =

Temple in Chiayi County, Taiwan

Shuixian Temple
- 水仙宮
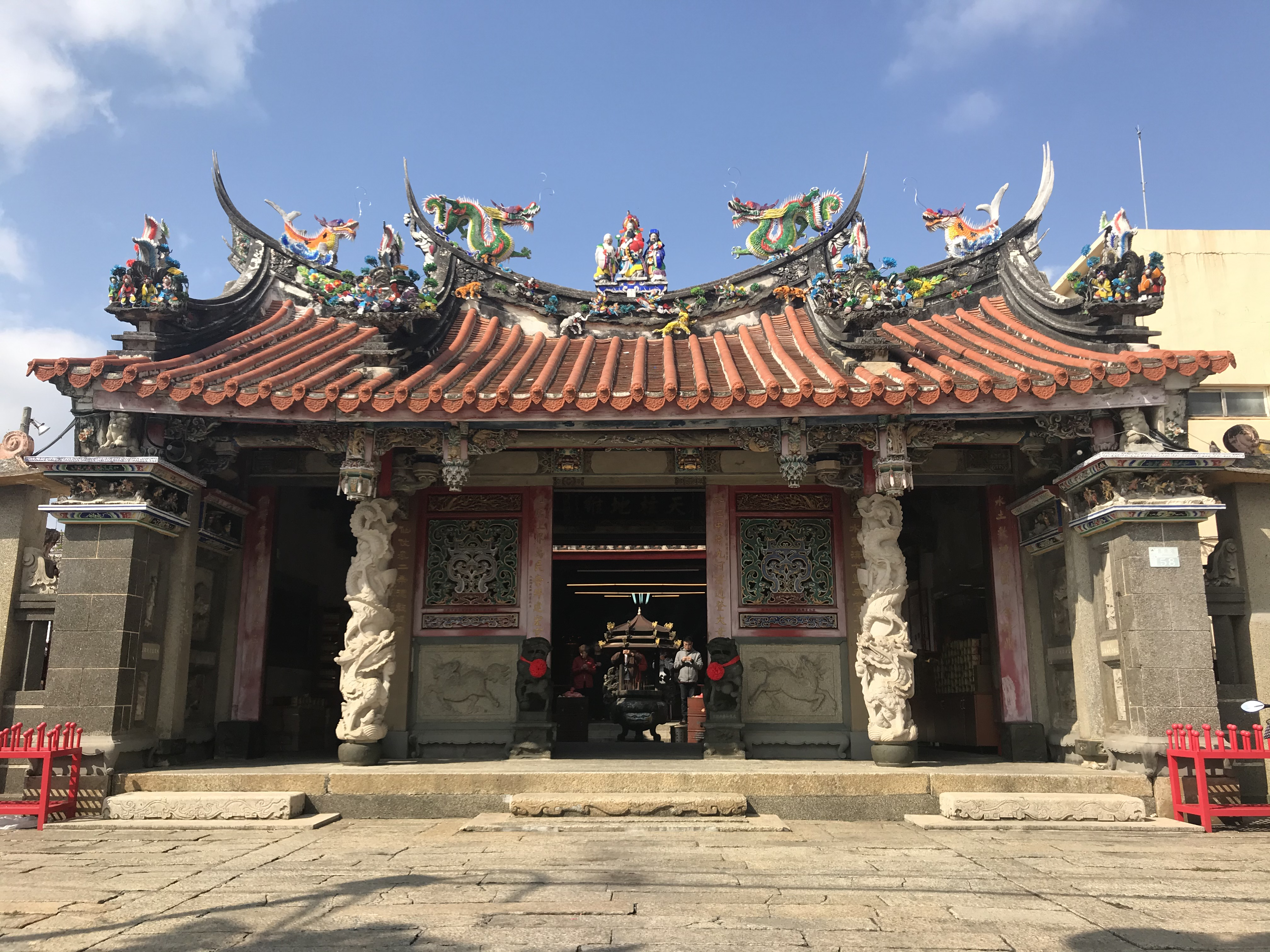

Religion
- Affiliation: Taoism
- Deity: Shuixian Zunwang

Location
- Location: Xingang, Chiayi
- Country: Taiwan
- Interactive map of Shuixian Temple
- Coordinates: 23.5618°N 120.3087°E

Architecture
- Completed: 1739
- Direction of façade: East
- National monument of Taiwan
- Official name: 笨港水仙宮
- Type: Temple
- Designated: 27 November 1985

Bengang Shuixian Temple (Chinese: 笨港水仙宮; pinyin: Bèngǎng Shuǐxiān Gōng) is a temple located in Nangang Village, Xingang Township, Chiayi County, Taiwan. Sitting on the south shore of the Beigang River, the temple is dedicated to five water gods collectively known as Shuixian Zunwang.

== History ==
"Bengang" is the historical name of a major port city along the Beigang River founded in 1621, which flourished as both a trade center and a pirate's haven. Shuixian Temple was built in 1739 for residents to pray for the safety of the boatsmen. However, a flood in 1750 destroyed most of Bengang and caused the river to change course to run directly through the city, forming two distinct settlements, Beigang (lit. "north port", currently Beigang, Yunlin) and Nangang (lit. "south port"). Another major flood in 1803 destroyed Shuixian Temple completely, along with other major temples in Bengang. This time, the river's course shifted so far south that most residents had moved north to Beigang. Nevertheless, Shuixian Temple was rebuilt in 1814 in its original location in Nangang. The last major construction was in 1848 to form the current four rows of halls.

In 1985, Shuixian Temple was designated as a level two national monument for its cultural significance, particularly for its many historical artifacts that date to the Qing dynasty.

== Architecture ==
Shuixian Temple is dedicated to Shuixian Zunwang. The five figures (Yu the Great, Xiang Yu, Wu Zixu, Qu Yuan, and Lu Ban) are housed in the main hall, with Yu the Great in the middle. The front hall is dedicated to Mazu, while the rear hall is dedicated to Guan Yu.

Shuixian Temple is home to several historical artifacts. In the rear hall, there is a plaque (reading 日月爭光) and a pair of dragon pillars that date to the reign of Jiaqing Emperor (1796-1820). The menshen and other paintings were done by famed painter Chen Yufeng (陳玉峰, 1900–1964).

== See also ==
- Bengang Tianhou Temple
- Fengtian Temple
- Chaotian Temple, Yunlin County
- List of temples in Taiwan
- List of national monuments of Taiwan
