= Thuan Thien =

Thuận Thiên (Heaven's will) may refer to:

- Thuận Thiên (Trần dynasty empress), Empress Consort of Trần Thái Tông
- Thuận Thiên (Nguyễn dynasty empress), Imperial Consort of Gia Long
- Thuận Thiên (sword), the mythical sword of Lê Thái Tổ
- Lý Thái Tổ, era from 1010 to 1028
- Lê Thái Tổ, era from 1428 to 1433

== See also ==
- Shuntian (disambiguation) (順天, era names and placenames of China)
- Suncheon (순천, a city in South Korea)
