= Shuntian =

Shuntian may refer to:

- Shuntian Prefecture (順天), a Ming and Qing era political division around Beijing
  - Beijing itself, by metonymy
- Jiangsu Shuntian or Jiangsu Sainty FC, a Chinese football club

== Historical eras ==
- Shuntian (759–761), era name used by Shi Siming
- Shuntian (895–896), era name used by Dong Chang (warlord)

== See also ==
- Thuận Thiên (disambiguation), the corresponding spelling in Vietnamese
- Suncheon (순천), a city in South Korea
