= Dian'an Temple =

Temple in Changhua County, Taiwan

- 北斗奠安宮
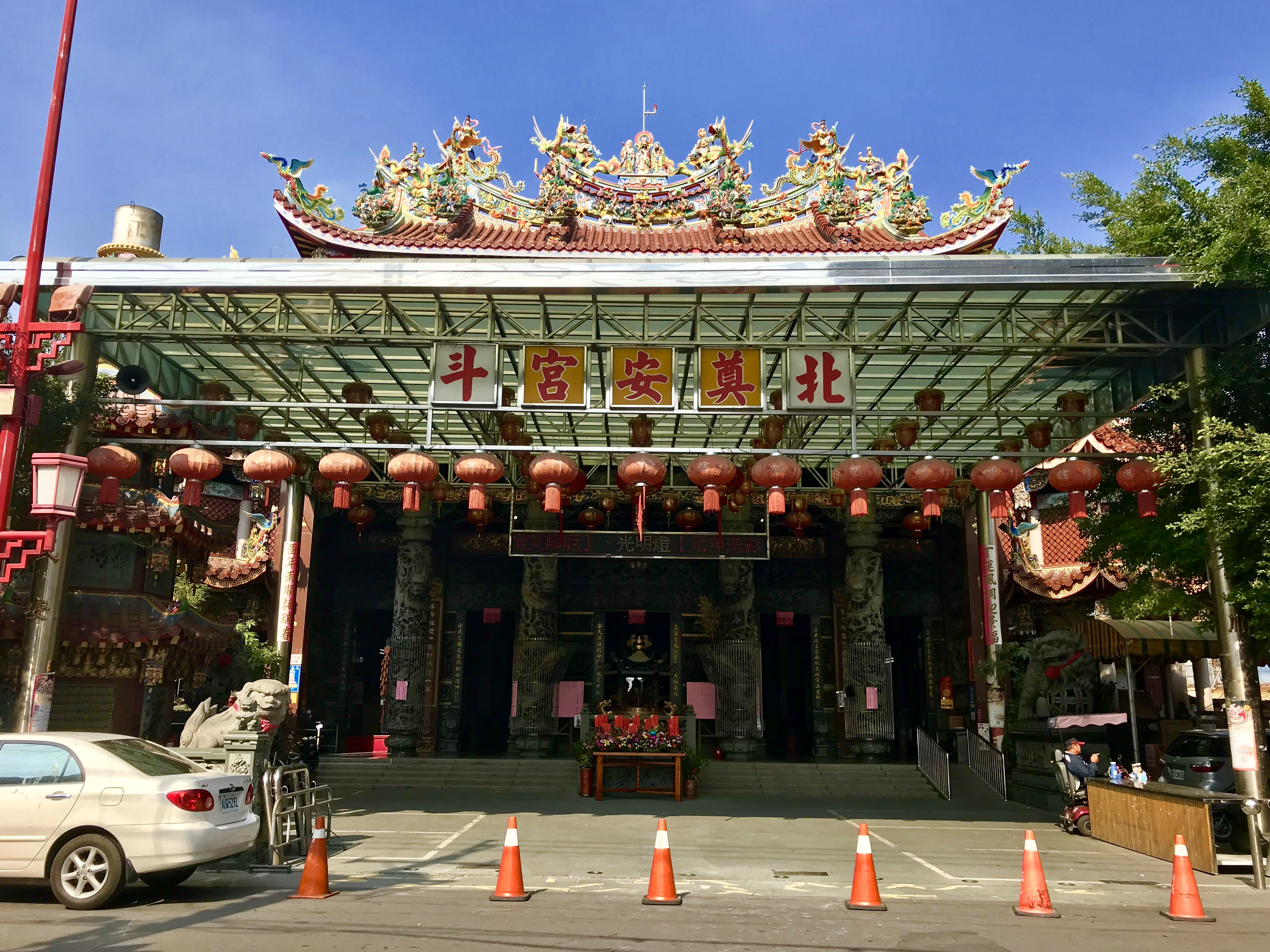
- Exterior of the temple in Beidou

Religion
- Affiliation: Taoism
- Deity: Mazu
- Governing body: Beidou Dian'an temple Board of Directors and Supervisors

Location
- Location: Beidou, Changhua County
- Country: Taiwan
- Interactive map of Dian'an Temple
- Coordinates: 23.8724°N 120.5253°E

Architecture
- Completed: 1718
- Direction of façade: South

Website
- https://www.dianangong.org.tw/

Beidou Dian'an Temple (Chinese: 北斗奠安宮; pinyin: Běidǒu Diànān Gōng) is a temple located in Beidou Township, Changhua County, Taiwan. The temple is dedicated to the sea goddess Mazu, who is the deified form of Lin Moniang.

== History ==
The history of Dian'an Temple traces back to another temple in Dongluo known as Tianhou Temple (current-day Jiumei in Xizhou Township). Sources disagree on when Tianhou Temple was founded (1684 or 1718), but the small temple was one of the first Mazu temples in southern Changhua and had a devout following. In the late 18th century, floods and conflicts between Quanzhou and Zhangzhou settlers caused widespread damage to Dongluo. Therefore, in 1806, Tianhou Temple was moved from Dongluo north to current-day Beidou, which had a higher elevation, and was renamed as Dian'an Temple.

Despite being protected as a level three monument in 1983, Dian'an Temple was in desperate need of repair, leading to heated debates on how to preserve the building. A rear hall was constructed in 1985, and the original temple was dismantled and moved to Taiwan Cultural Park, a tourist attraction in Huatan Township, in 1988. The older temple's protected status was removed the same year. Then, between 1989 and 2003, a new temple was constructed on the original site.

Meanwhile, Taiwan Cultural Park was heavily damaged after the 1999 Jiji earthquake and was closed to the public. Dian'an Temple was fortunately not destroyed, but the park's closure meant that it was left unprotected. On 1 July 2013, the original Dian'an Temple was redesignated as a historical building as a first step to the building's preservation. In November 2020, the Changhua County Government formed a committee to reconstruct it in the current Dian'an Temple's parking lot.

== Architecture ==
The current Dian'an Temple in Beidou is unique in that it contains a market in the rear hall. During the building's construction, the temple lacked the funds to complete the building, so they allocated a space for market vendors for extra income to the temple. After damage in the 1999 Jiji earthquake, the market was refurbished and completed in 2016.
