= Beidou, Changhua =

Urban township in Changhua County, Taiwan

Beidou Township 北斗鎮
- Urban township
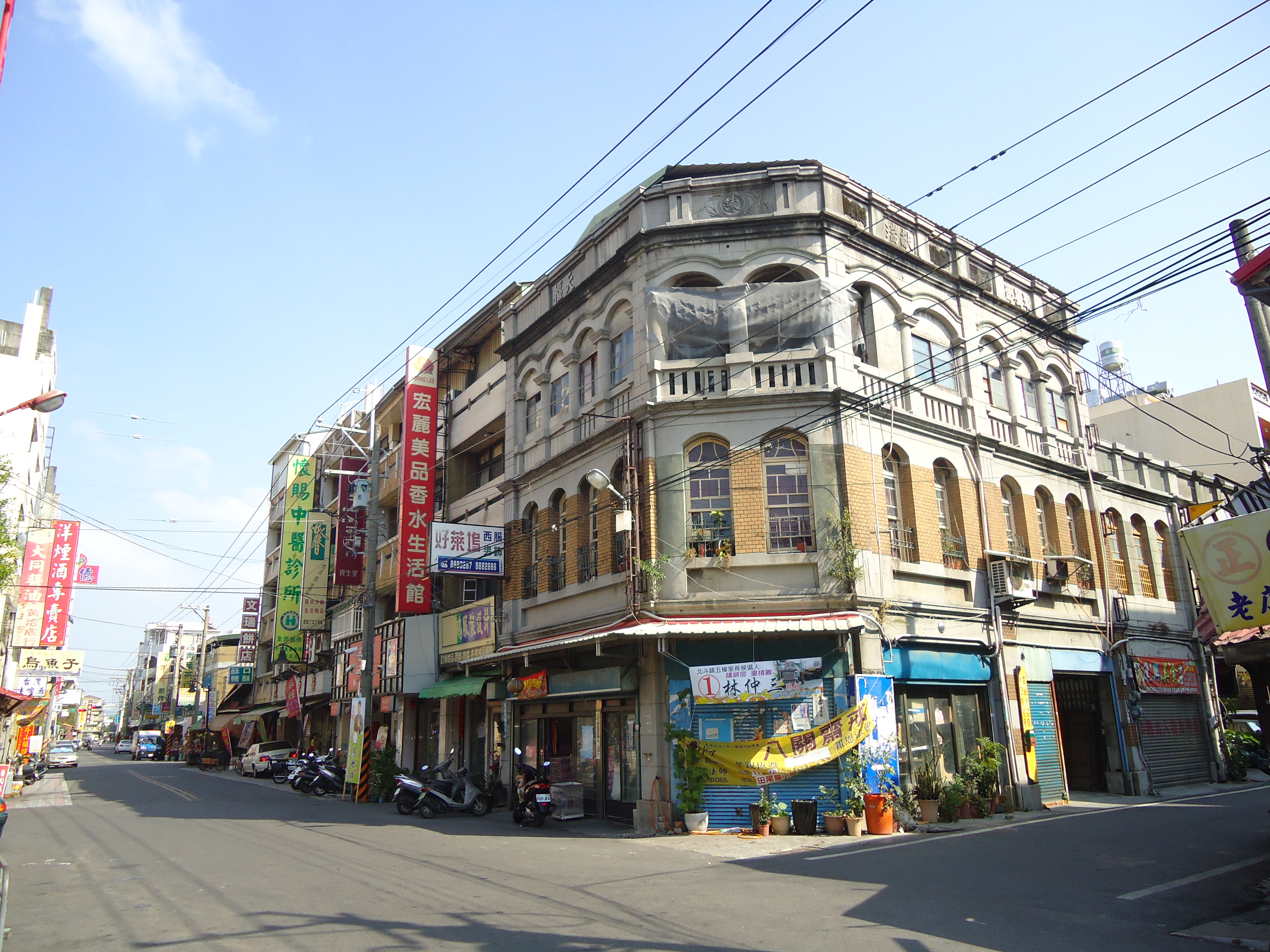

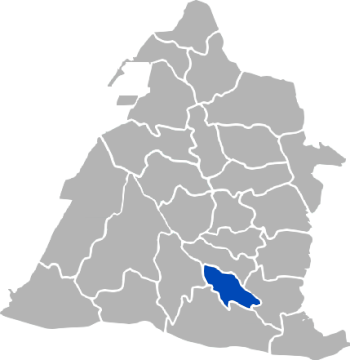
- Beidou Township in Changhua County

- Location within Taiwan
- Coordinates: 23.8747°N 120.5248°E
- Location: Changhua County, Taiwan

Government
  - Mayor: Yang Lih-siang (KMT)

Area
  - Total: 19 km^{2} (7.3 sq mi)

Population (January 2023)
  - Total: 33,289
  - Density: 1,800/km^{2} (4,500/sq mi)
- Website: www.chcg.gov.tw/TSO/beidou/index.aspx (in Chinese)

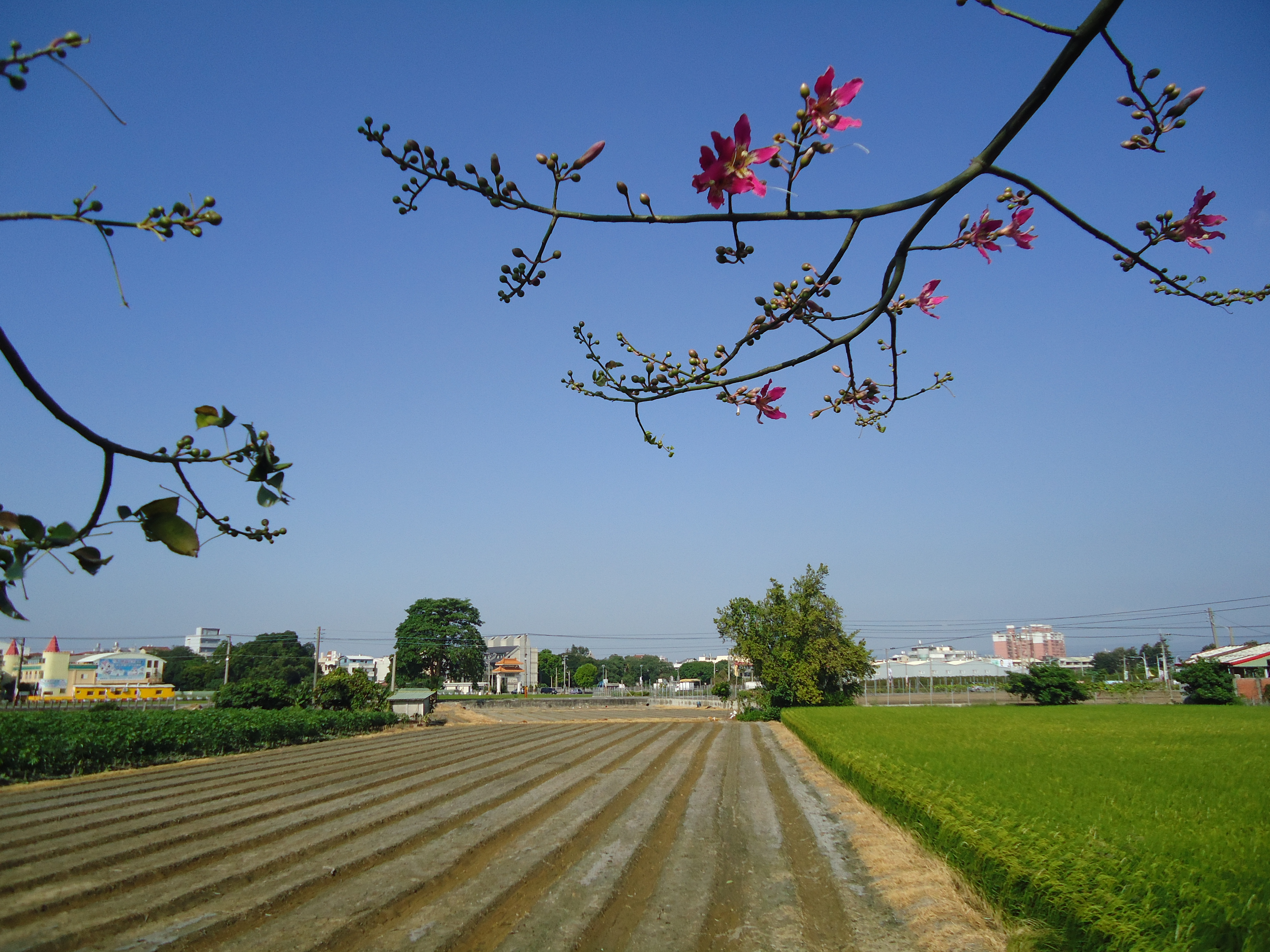
Farm fields in Beidou Township

Beidou Township (Chinese: 北斗鎮; pinyin: Běidǒu Zhèn; Pe̍h-ōe-jī: Pak-táu-tìn) is an urban township in Changhua County, Taiwan.

== History ==
Beidou was previously known as Po-tau (寶斗; Pe̍h-ōe-jī: Pó-táu), a harbor on the branch of Zhuoshui River and engaged trading with mainland China. As the harbor was an important site of southern Changhua County in the late Qing era, the town was surrounded by fences and had defensive walls. In 1738, the first downtown street named Shezi Village was built in the southern bank of Dongluo River. In 1806, houses and fields along the downtown streets were all ruined due to the battle between immigrants from Zhangzhou and Quanzhou. In 1821, Shezi Village was rebuilt in the Baodou Village at the riverside.

== Geography ==
It is located in an alluvial plain in the southeast part of the county. With an area of 19.2547 square kilometers, it is the second smallest township in the county after Xianxi Township. As of January 2023, its population was 33,289, including 16,654 males and 16,635 females.

== Administrative divisions ==
The township comprises 15 villages: Dadao, Daxin, Guangfu, Juren, Qixing, Tungguang, Wenchang, Wuquan, Xian, Xide, Xinsheng, Xinzheng, Zhonghe, Zhongliao and Zhongqing.

== Economy ==
It is famous for ba-wan, a popular Taiwanese food item that was invented in the township.

== Tourist attractions ==
- Dian'an Temple
- Beidou Old Street
- Beidou Riverside Park

== Notable people ==
Gie-Ming Lin, the father of basketball player Jeremy Lin, grew up in Beidou.
