= Xingang, Chiayi =

Rural township in Chiayi County, Taiwan

Coordinates: 23.56°N 120.35°E

Xingang Township 新港鄉 Singang, Sinkang
- Rural township
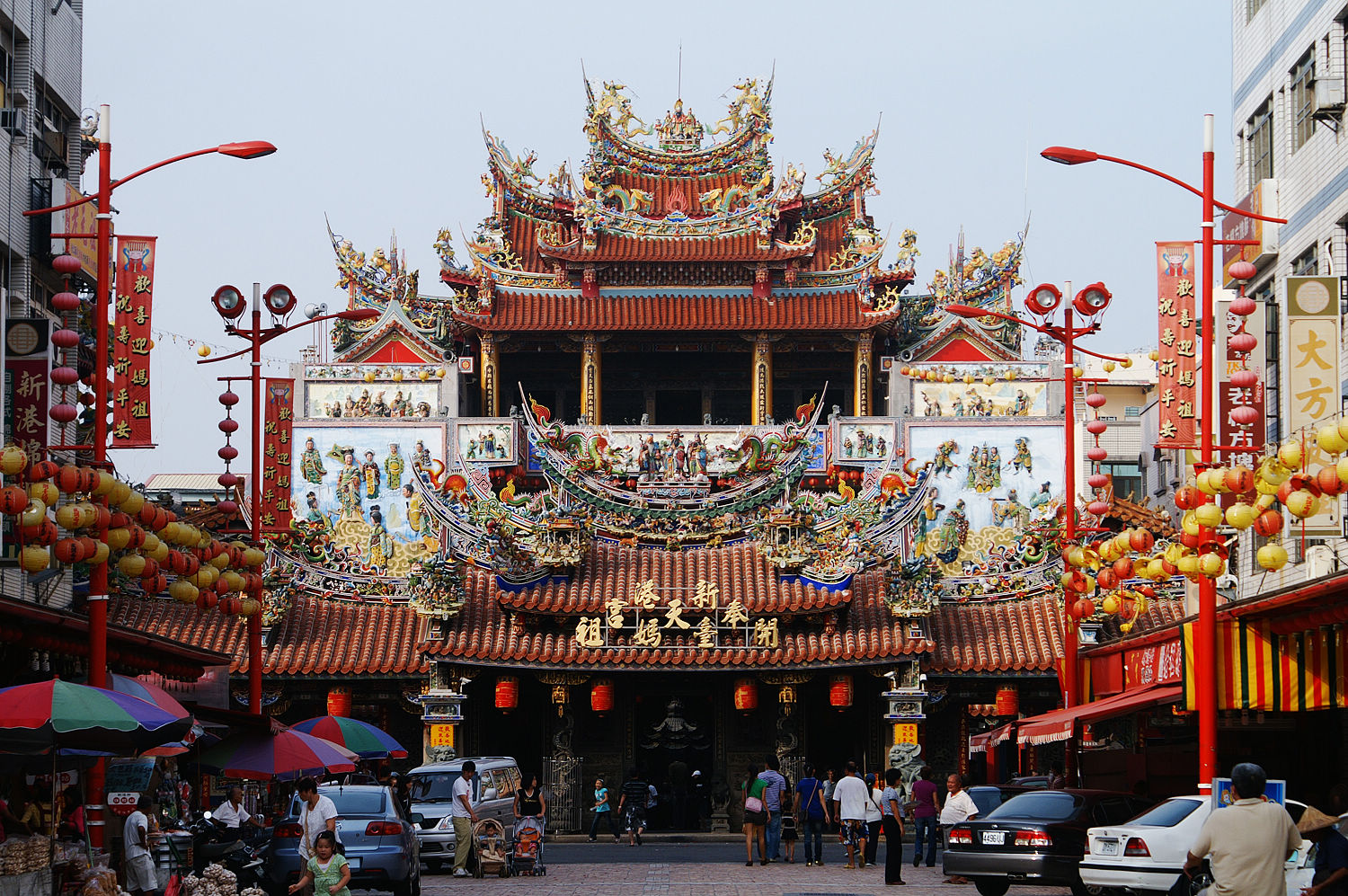
- Fengtian Temple

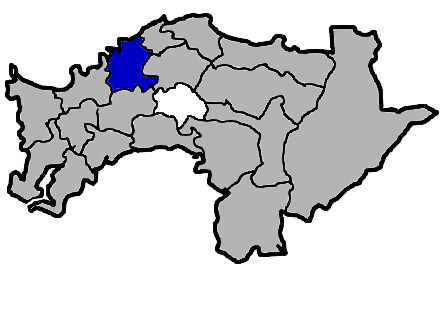
- Xingang Township in Chiayi County
- Location: Chiayi County, Taiwan

Area
  - Total: 66.05 km^{2} (25.50 sq mi)

Population (May 2022)
  - Total: 30,543

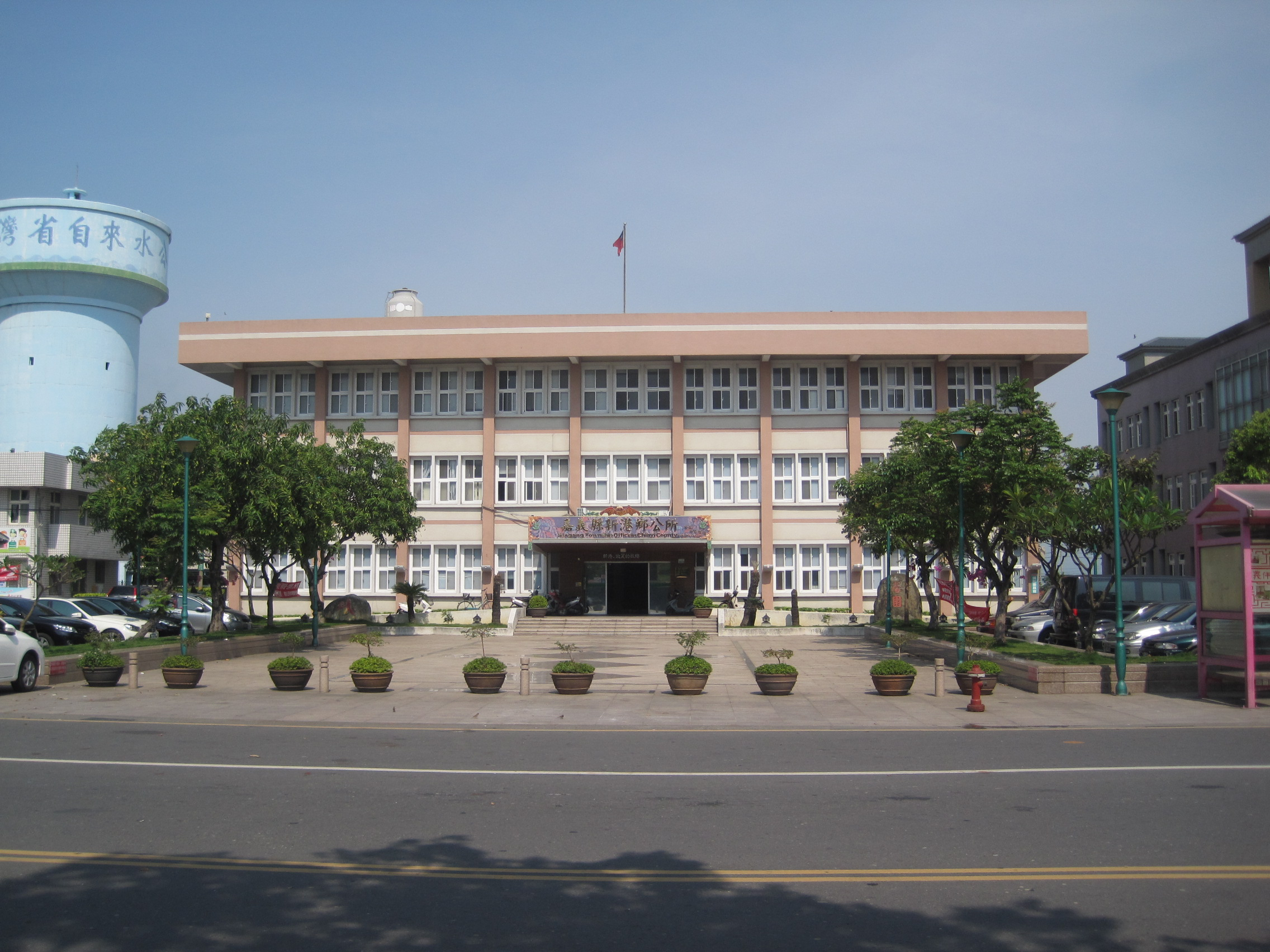
Xingang Township Government Office

Xingang Township or Singang Township (Chinese: 新港鄉; pinyin: Xīngǎng Xiāng) is a rural township in Chiayi County, Taiwan.

== Geography ==
It has a population of 30,543 and an area of 66.05 square kilometres (25.50 sq mi).

== Administrative divisions ==
The township comprises 22 villages: Anhe, Bantou, Beilun, Beizi, Caigong, Datan, Daxing, Fude, Gonghe, Gonghou, Gongqian, Gumin, Haiying, Nangang, Nanlun, Sanjian, Tanda, Xibei, Xizhuang, Yuemei, Yuetan, Zhongyang and Zhongzhuang.

== Education ==
=== Senior high school ===
- National Singang Senior High School of Arts

=== Junior high school ===
- Hsingkang Junior High School

=== Primary school ===
- Hsingkang Primary School
- Wenchang Primary School
- Gumin Primary School
- Yuemei Primary School
- Anho Primary School
- Fushing Primary School

== Tourist attractions ==
- Xingang Mazu Temple

Originally a local temple to goddess Mazu, the Xingang Mazu Temple emerged in the 21st century as a temple of regional and even national significance. It organizes annual "inspection-tour" processions through southern Taiwan and pilgrimages to Mazu temples in Mainland China, where it has opened a branch Mazu temple in Yongchun.

- Bengang Shuixian Temple
- Bengang Tianhou Temple
- Dasing Temple
- Dengyun College
- Fengtian Temple
- Liousing Temple
- Singang Railway Park
- Southern Altar Shueiyue Nunnery

== Notable natives ==
- Ang Ui-jin, linguist
- Hsu Chih-chieh, member of 8th Legislative Yuan
- Lin Chin-sheng, Vice President of Examination Yuan (1984–1993)
- Lin Hwai-min, dancer, writer and choreographer
- Tsai Chen-nan, actor and singer
