= Fengtian Temple =

Temple in Xingang Township, Chiayi County, Taiwan

- 奉天宮
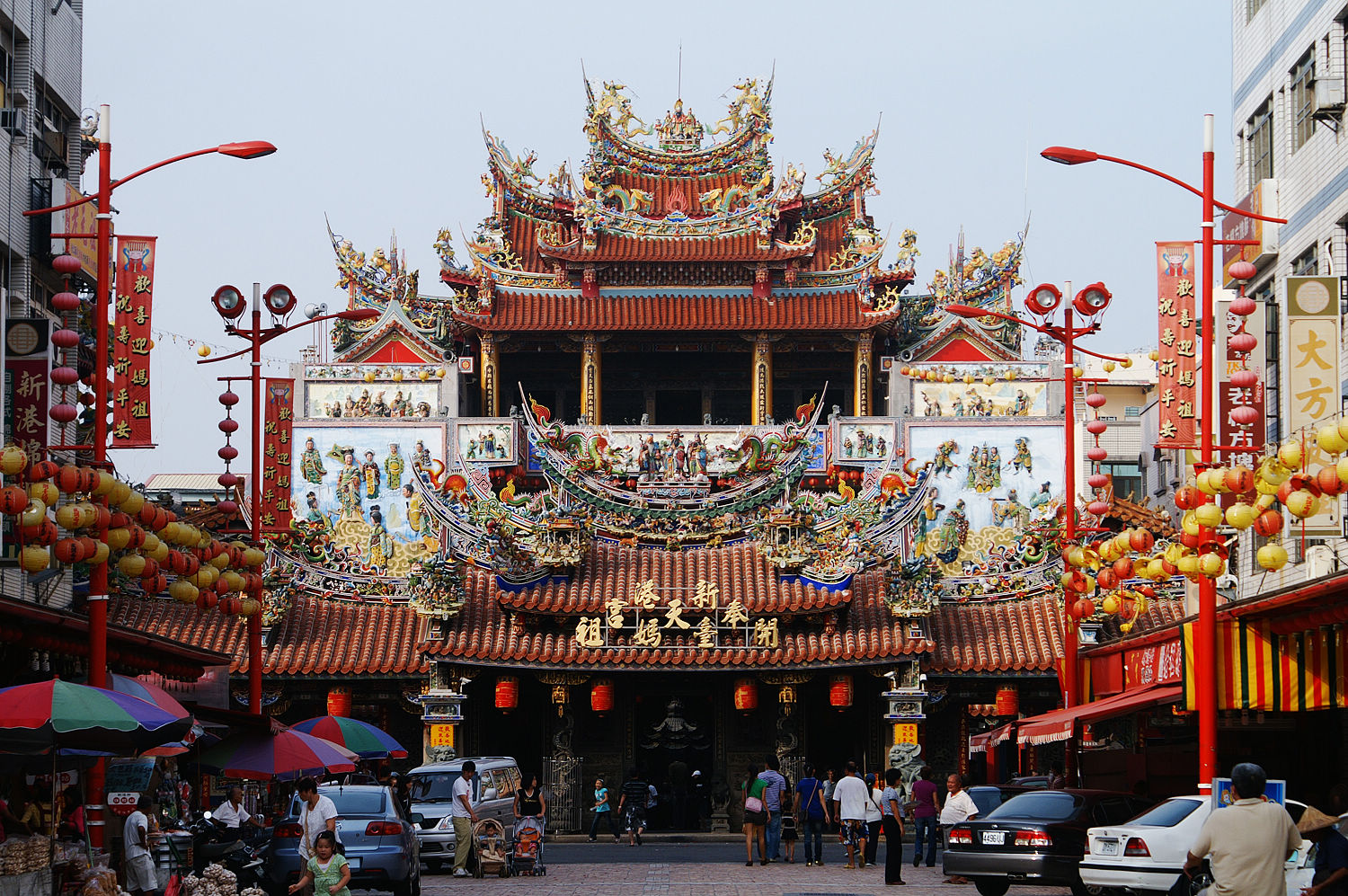

Religion
- Affiliation: Taoism
- Deity: Mazu

Location
- Location: Xingang Township, Chiayi County
- Country: Taiwan
- Interactive map of Fengtian Temple
- Coordinates: 23.5567°N 120.34790°E

Architecture
- Completed: 1811 (Note: Or 1812)
- Direction of façade: South

Xingang Fengtian Temple (Chinese: 新港奉天宮; pinyin: Xīngǎng Fèngtiān Gōng), sometimes romanized as Fongtian Temple, is a temple located in Xingang Township, Chiayi County, Taiwan. The temple is a county-level monument and the destination of the annual Dajia Mazu Pilgrimage.

== History ==
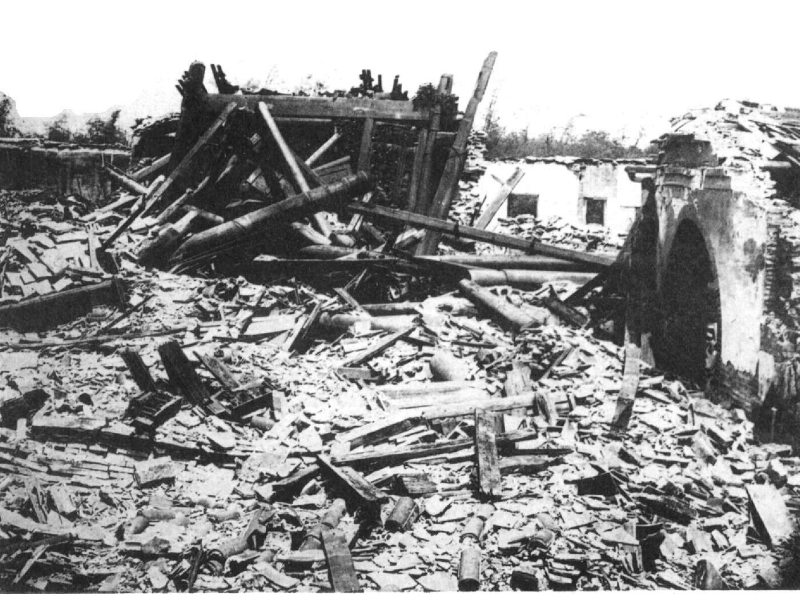
Fengtian Temple after the 1906 Meishan earthquake.

Bengang is the historical name of a major port city along the Beigang River which flourished as both a trade center and a pirate's haven. In 1700, a temple named Tianhou Temple was founded in the city and dedicated to Mazu. However, the Bengang was very prone to flooding, and a flood in 1799 (Note: Some sources say 1797 or 1809.) destroyed Tianhou Temple completely. Half of the temple relics were taken to the nearby Chaotian Temple in modern-day Beigang, while the other half was taken to Xingang, a new settlement 5 km (3.1 mi) east built by displaced Bengang residents. In Xingang, the relics were temporarily stored inside a small Tudigong temple.

In 1811, Xingang residents built Fengtian Temple to house the rescued relics under the leadership of Qing General Wang De-lu. After the flood, Fengtian Temple and Chaotian Temple argued about who was the true successor to the destroyed Tianhou Temple, so in 1826, Wang negotiated a compromise: the head Mazu statue belonged to Fengtian Temple, the second Mazu statue belonged to Chaotian Temple, and Wang would take the third Mazu statue to his residence in Xibei Village 5 km (3.1 mi) south of Xingang. (Note: Wang built Liuxing Temple next to his residence for the statue.) Even with the agreement, the two temples are still at odds to this day.

In 1905, Fengtian Temple was destroyed due to earthquake damage. (Note: There was no major earthquake recorded in Taiwan in 1905. Japanese architect Toshikata Sano recorded that Fengtian Temple was already leaning to one side after the 1904 Douliu earthquake. Most buildings in Xingang were destroyed in the 1906 Meishan earthquake.) The temple's restoration lasted from 1906 to 1917 and was led by Wu Haitong, a well-known woodworker of the era.

On August 18, 1985, Fengtian Temple was protected as a county-level monument for its "historical, cultural, and artistic value."

In 1988, the Dajia Mazu Pilgrimage changed its destination from Chaotian Temple to Fengtian Temple. That year, Dajia's Jenn Lann Temple made changes to the pilgrimage that implied seniority over Chaotian Temple, which angered the latter. Fengtian Temple officials proposed that the pilgrimage should end in Xingang instead, and the pilgrimage has never returned to Beigang ever since.

== Architecture ==
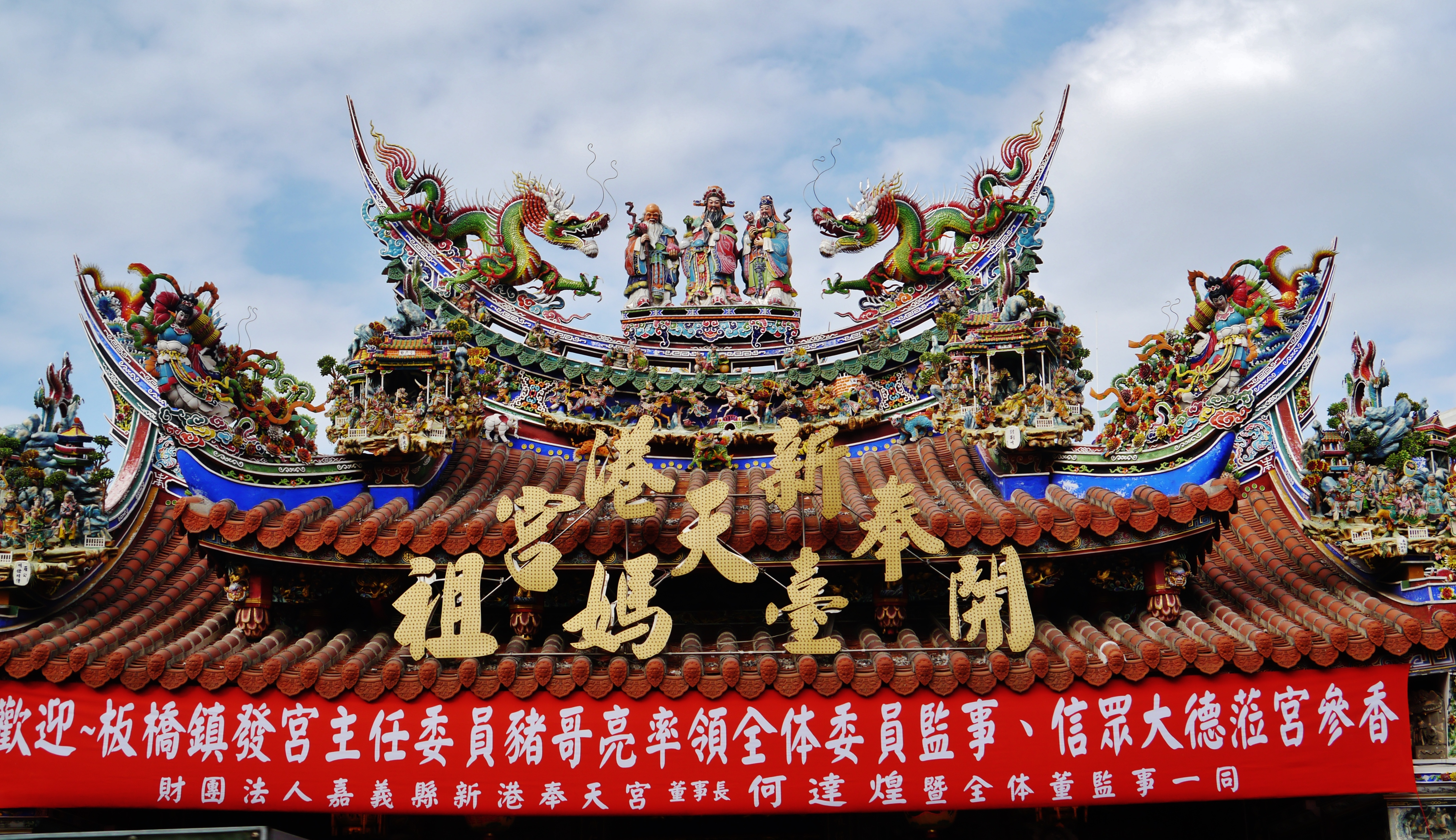
Cochin ware decorations on the roof of the Sanchuan Hall.

Fengtian Temple is a south-facing complex on County Highway 164 inside downtown Xingang. There are three halls on the central axis: the Sanchuan Hall, Main Haill (for Mazu), and the Rear Hall (for Guanyin). There is one flanking hall on each side housing Wenchang Dijun, Guan Yu, Chenghuangye, and Huye. A modern, four-story (Note: Written as five-story due to the avoidance of the number four in Chinese culture.) hall in the far back contains a variety of other deities.

As with most temples in Taiwan, the temple is built in the Hokkien architectural style. The street-facing Sanchuan Hall, designed by Wu Haitong, has Cochin ware decorations on the swallowtail roof and stone pillars inscribed with various religious symbols.

== Traditions ==
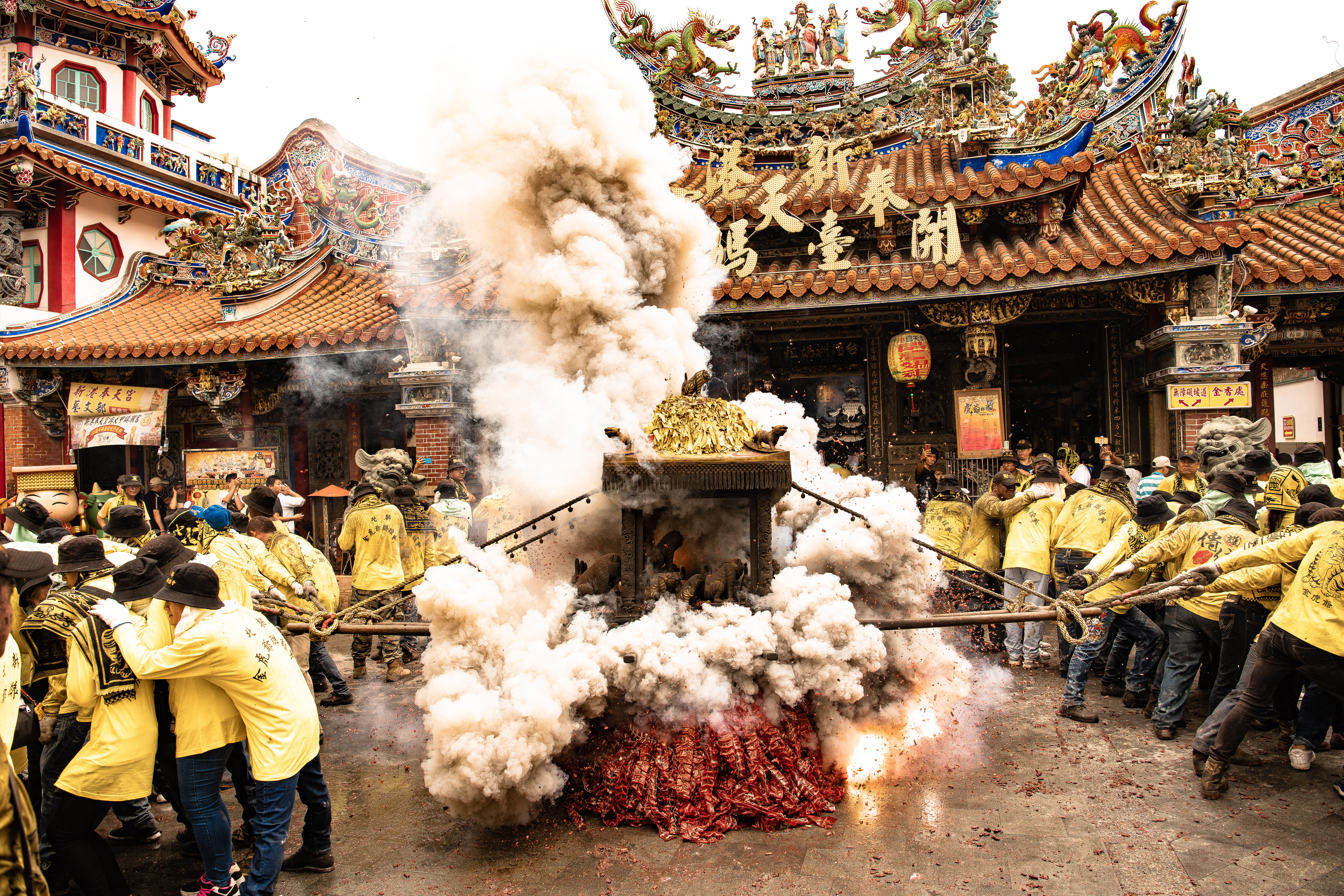
Celebration of Huye's birthday outside the temple.

Near Lantern Festival, a statue of Mazu is placed in a litter and paraded through Xingang. The ceremony is recognized as an intangible cultural heritage in Chiayi County.

In Taiwanese folk religion, Huye (虎爺) is a tutelary deity in the form of a tiger, said to be the protector of children. In Fengtian Temple, Huye is worshipped on its own altar in the right flanking hall, which differs from most temples that place it at the base of other deities's altars.

== Japanese plaque ==
Fengtian Temple possesses a gold plated plaque from the Imperial House of Japan dating from 1928. The plaque was crafted in Myōshin-ji in Kyoto as a Japanization campaign and was gifted to twenty major temples across Taiwan. Fengtian Temple's plaque is considered the best-preserved copy in Taiwan.

== Gallery ==
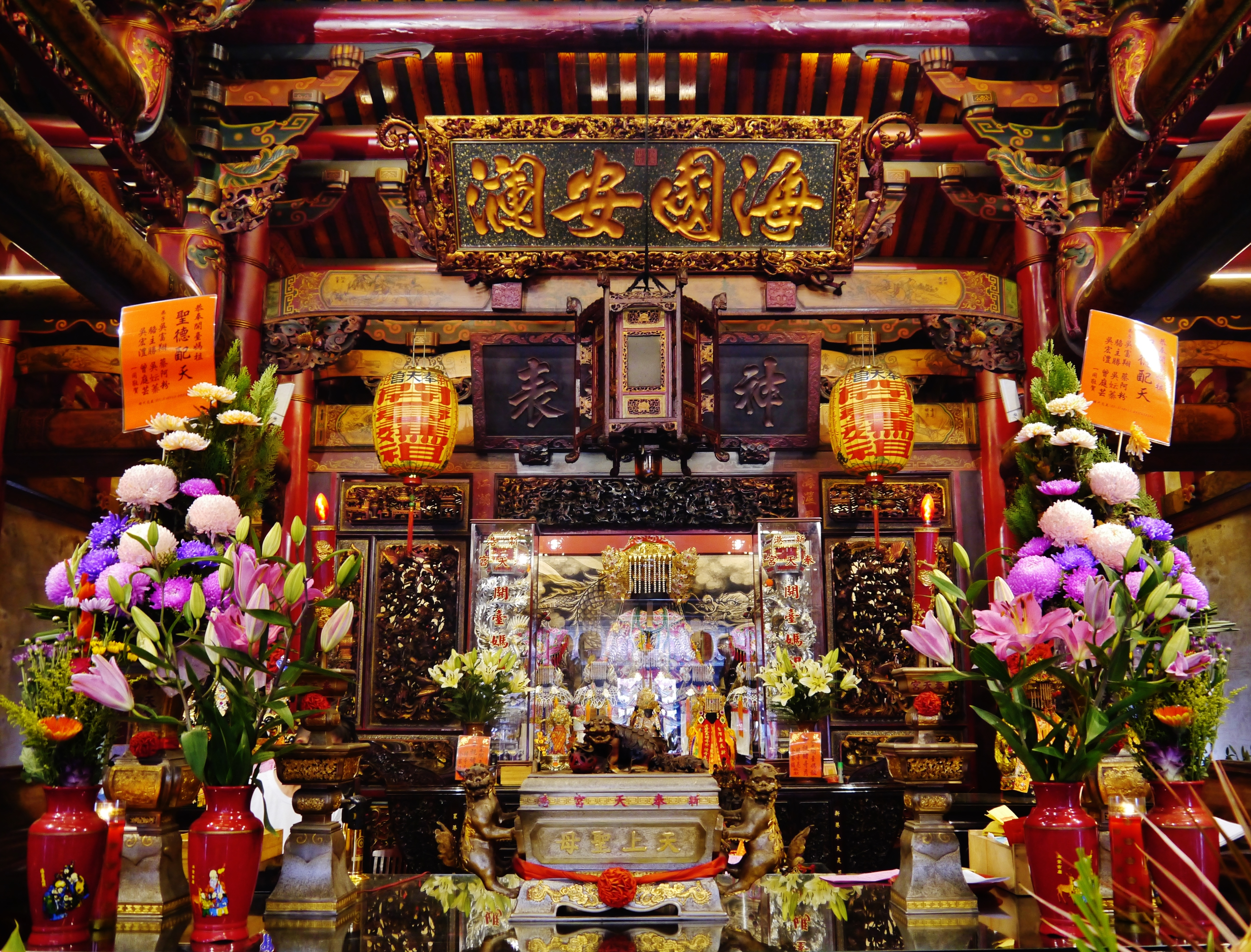
Altar for Mazu

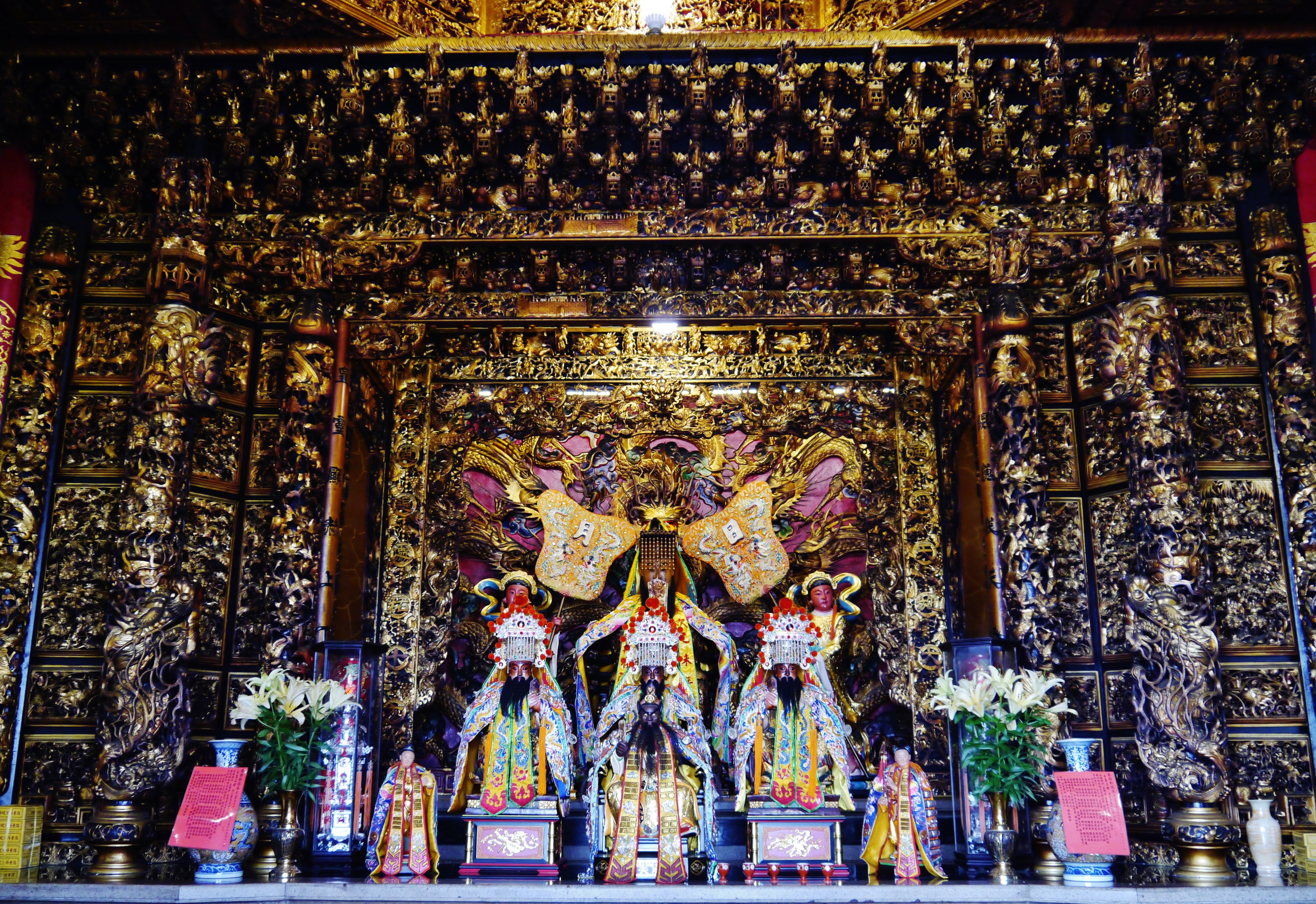
Altar for Guanyin

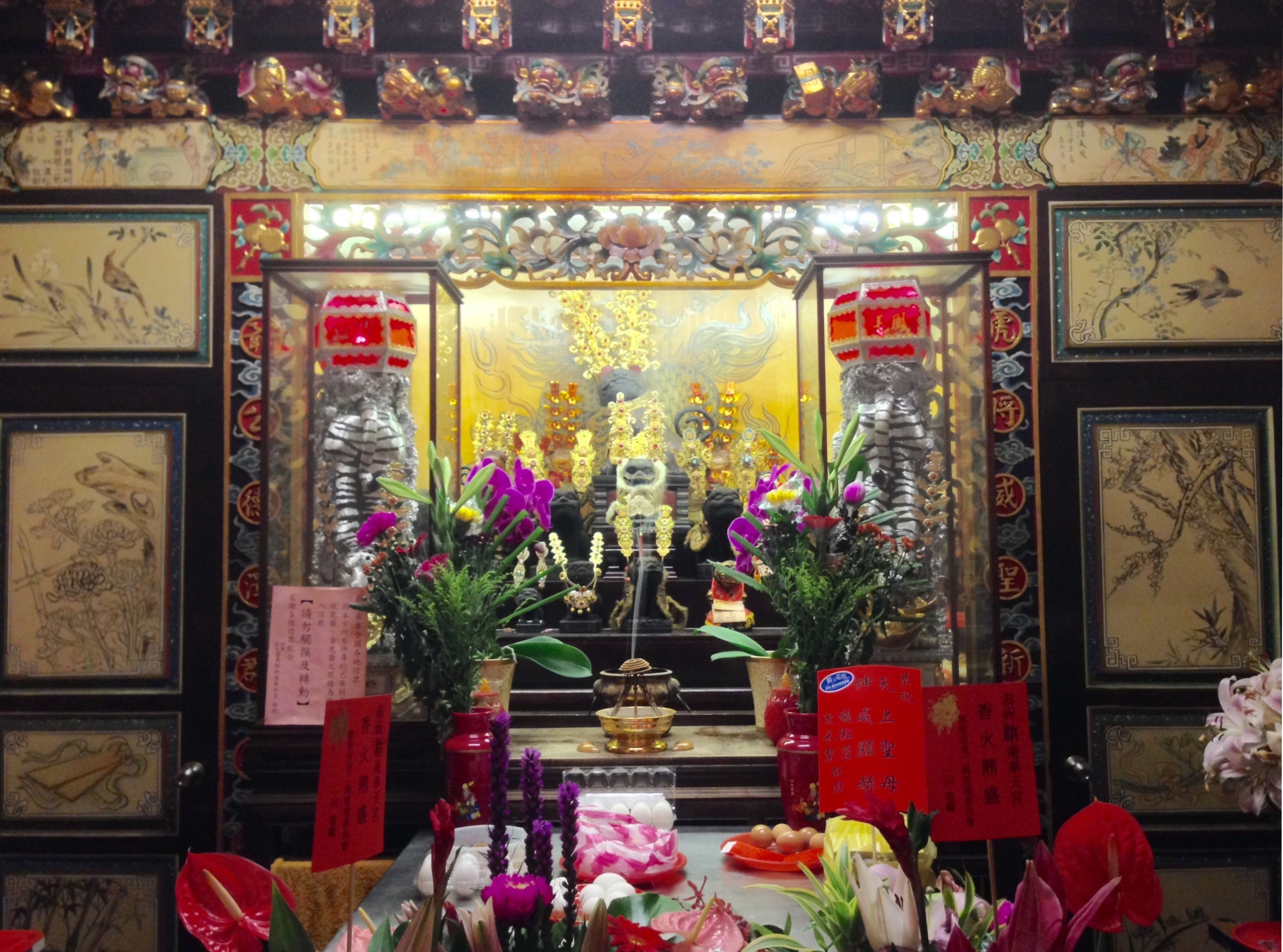
Altar for Huye

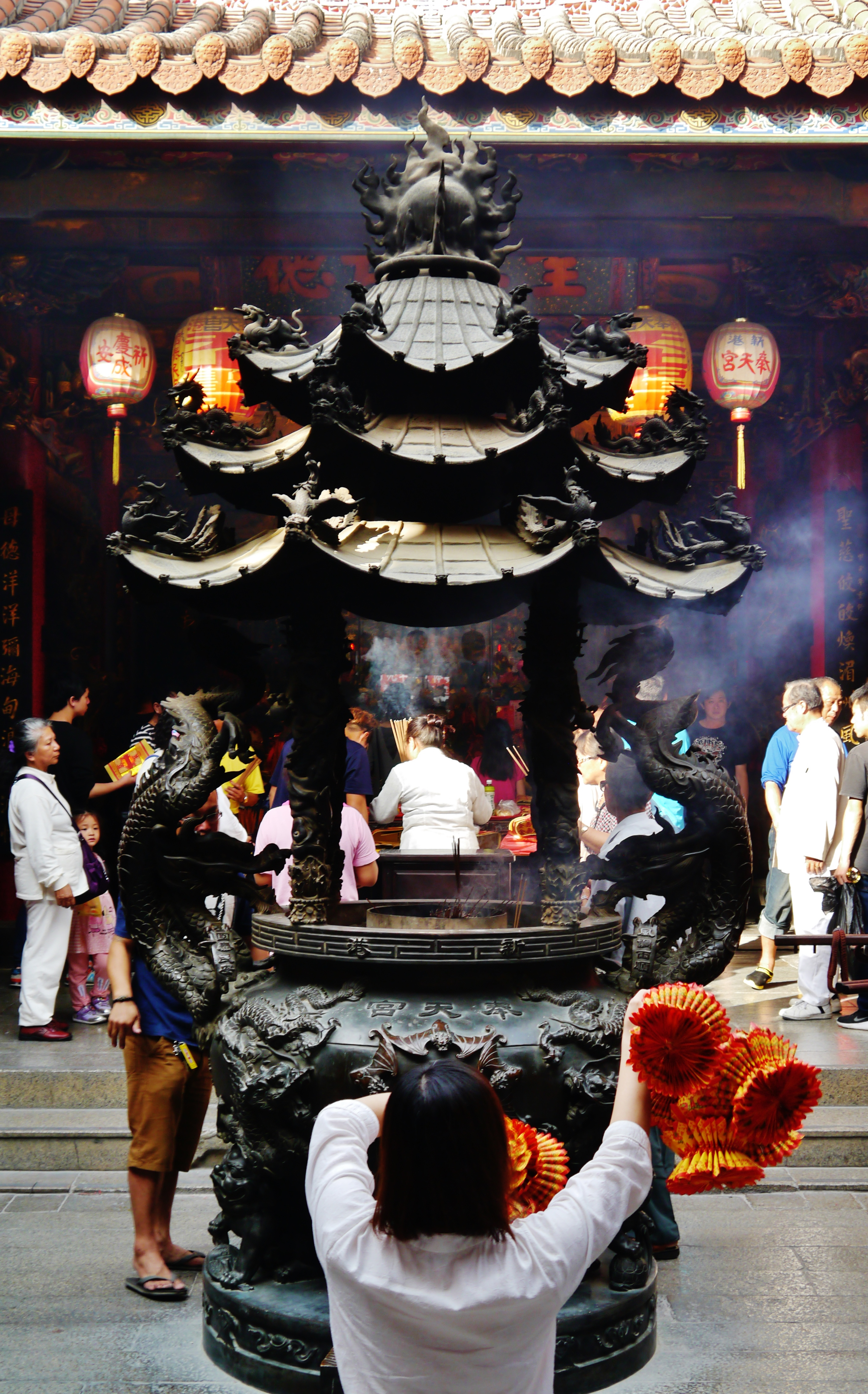
An incense burner inside the temple

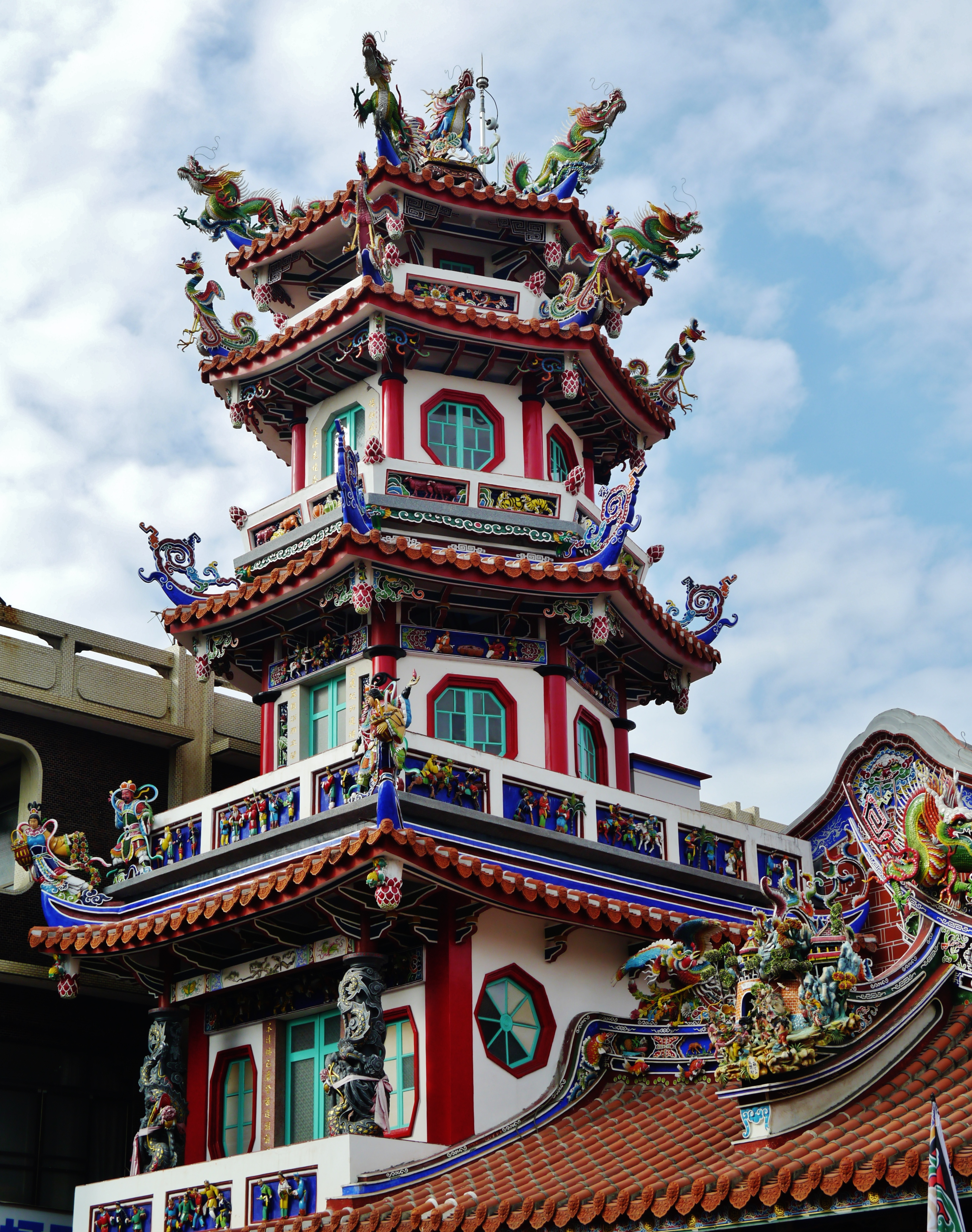
A decorated tower on the side of the temple
