= Hualien Railway Culture Park =

Gallery in Hualien City, Hualien County, Taiwan

- 花蓮鐵道文化園區
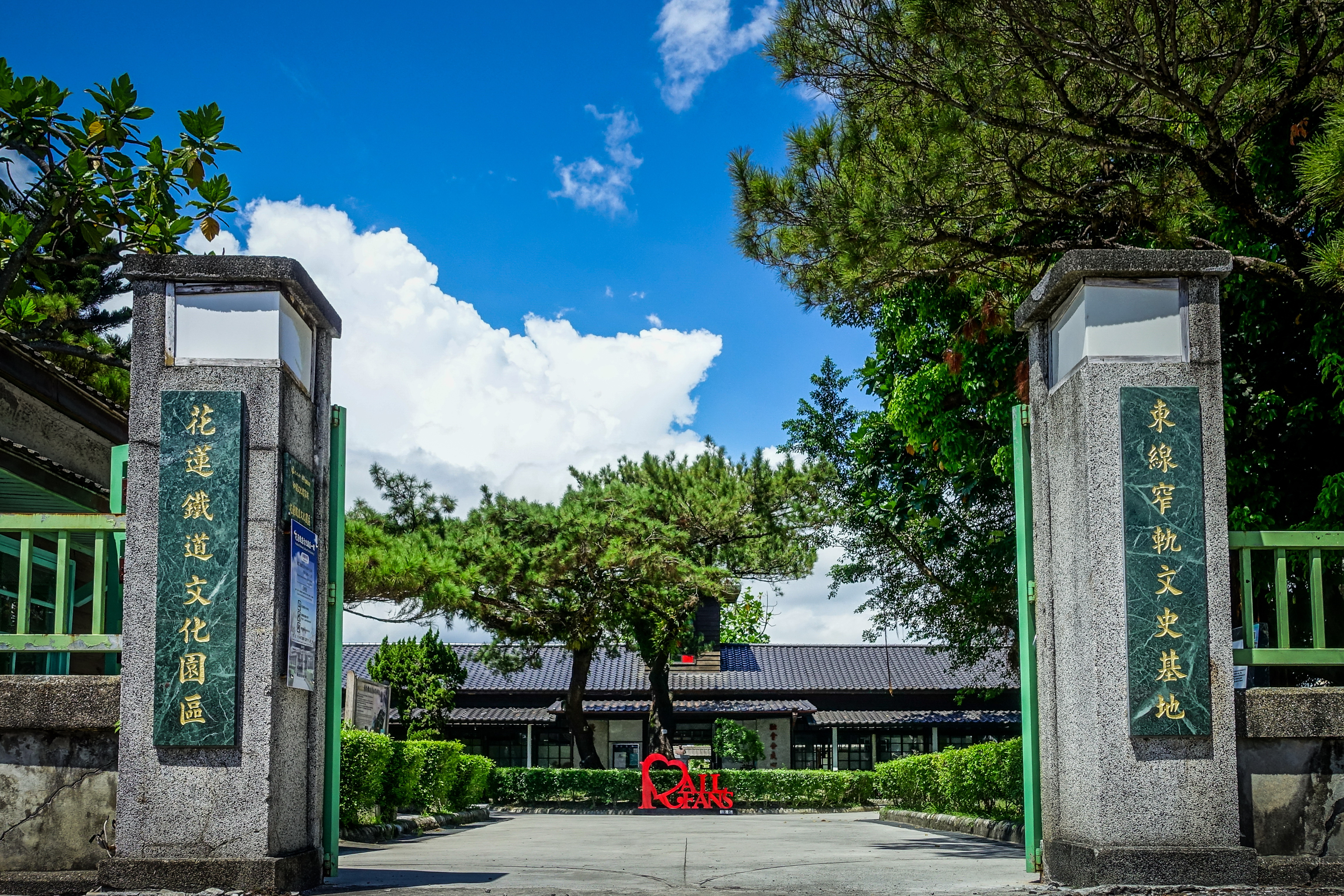
- Interactive map of the Hualien Railway Culture Park area
- Former names: Hualien Branch Office of the Railway Department

General information
- Type: gallery
- Location: Hualien City, Hualien County, Taiwan
- Coordinates: 23°58′29.0″N 121°36′38.2″E
- Completed: 1932

The Hualien Railway Culture Park (traditional Chinese: 花蓮鐵道文化園區; simplified Chinese: 花莲铁道文化园区; pinyin: Huālián Tiědào Wénhuà Yuánqū) is a gallery in Hualien City, Hualien County, Taiwan.

== History ==
The site used to be the Hualien Branch Office of the Railway Department in which it was the headquarters that controlled the Taitung line, originally constructed in 1932. The office was then renovated into a cultural park named Hualien Railway Culture Park.

== Exhibition ==
The gallery exhibits the artifacts of Taiwan's narrow-gauge railway base and the history of the Eastern Line.

== Transportation ==
The area is accessible southeast of Hualien Station of Taiwan Railway.

== Gallery ==
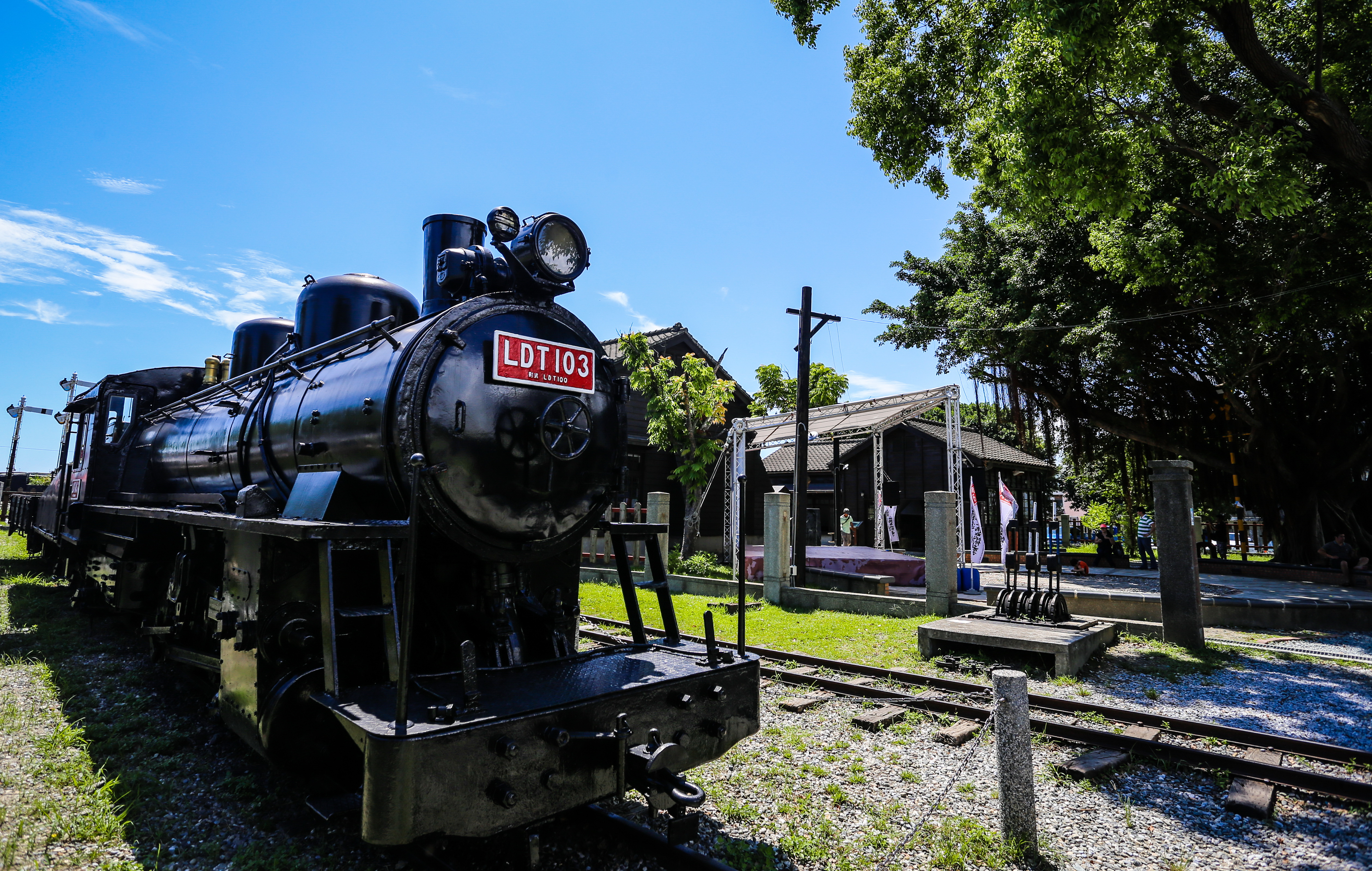
Locomotive of the east coast line (LDT103

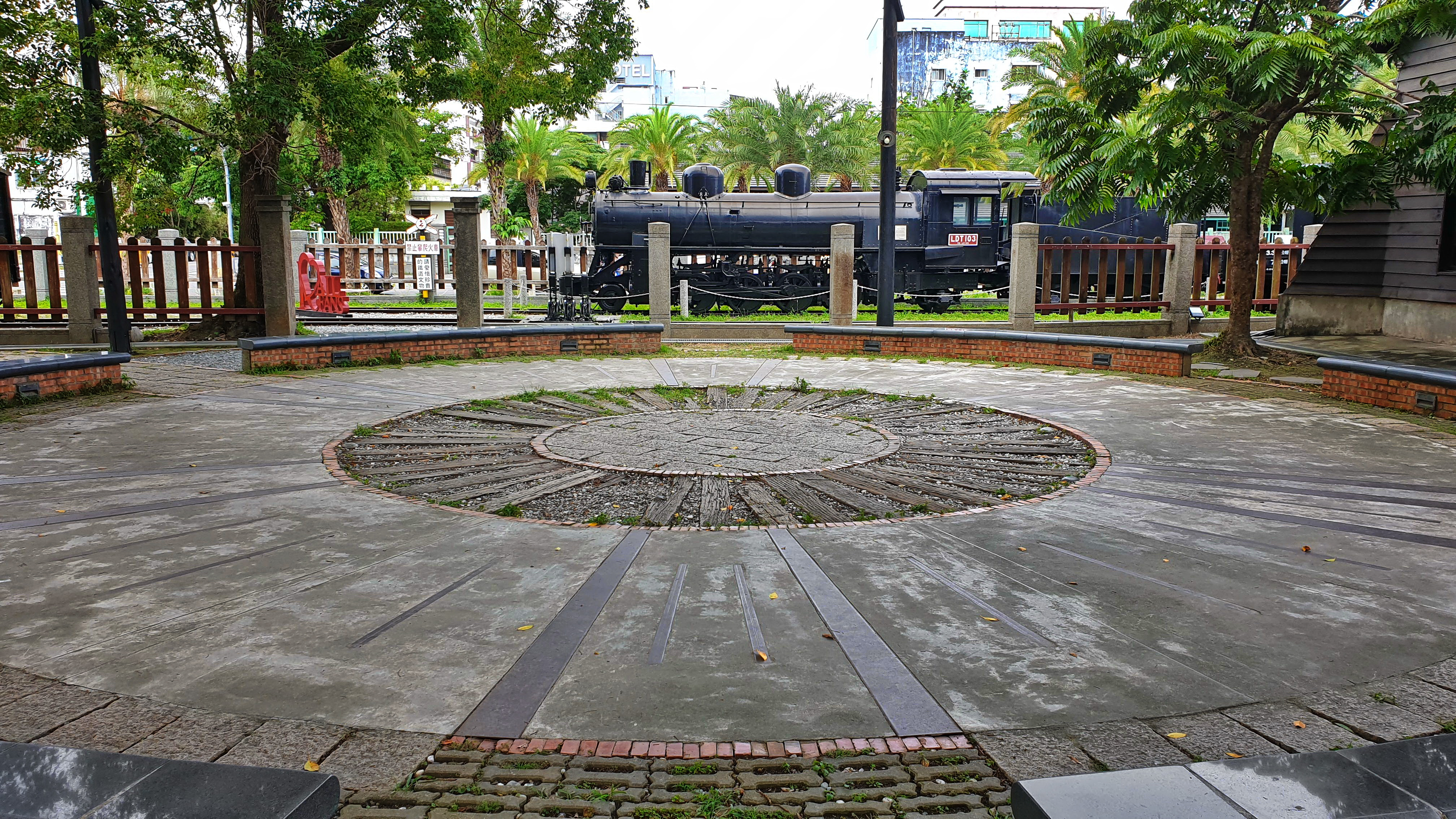
Hualien Railway Culture Park, Hall 2

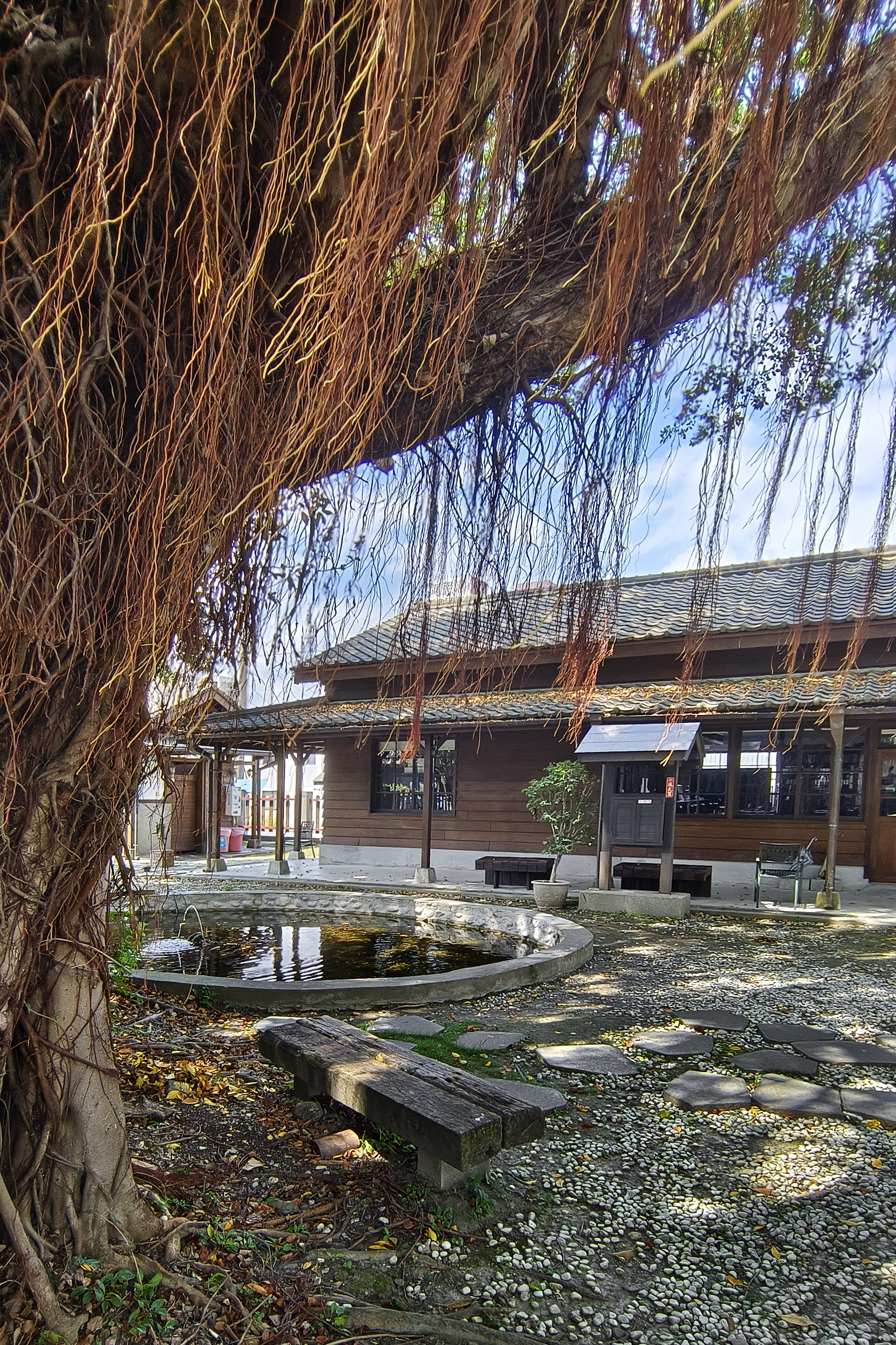
Hualien Railway Culture Park, Hall 2

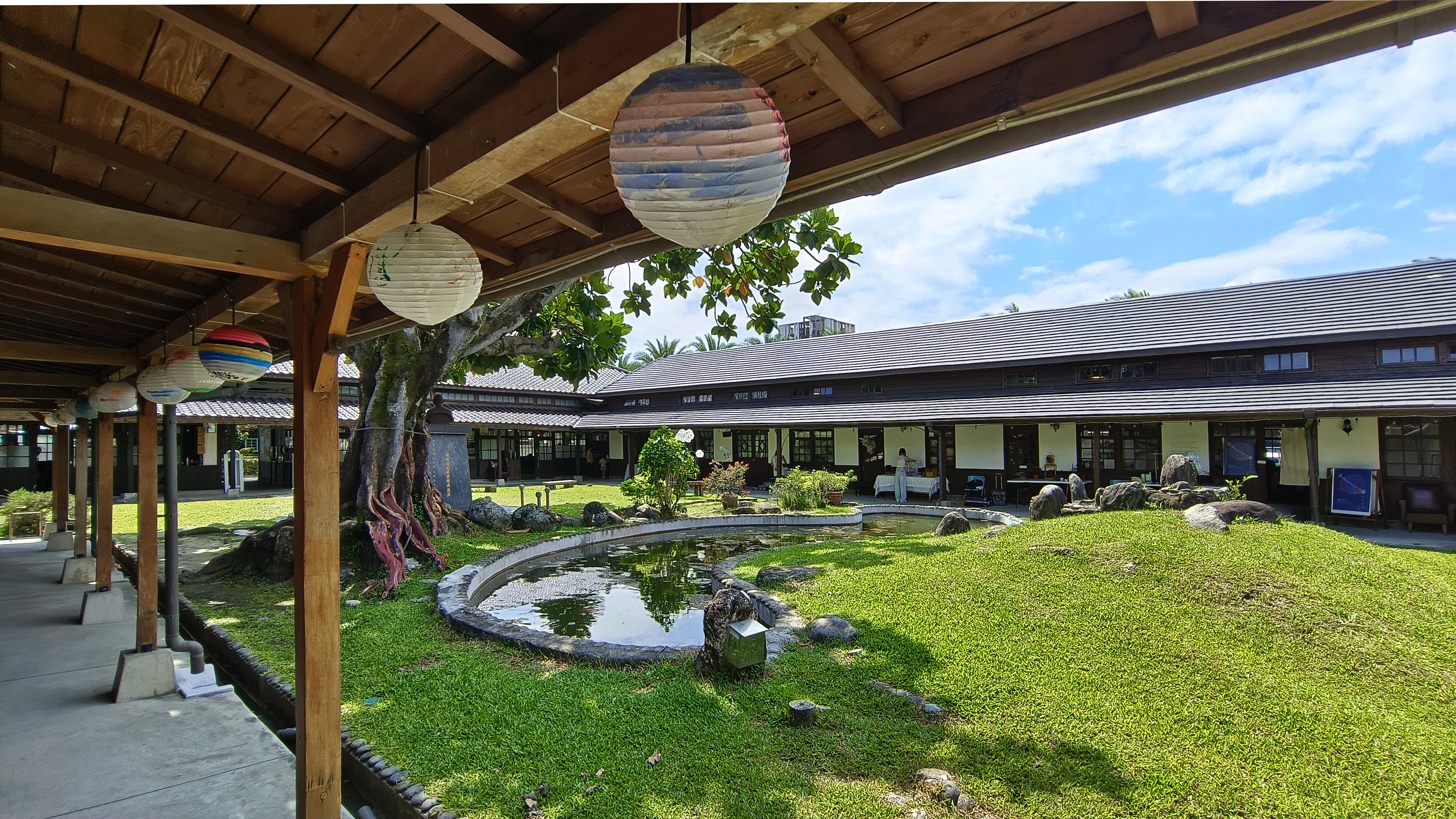
Hualien Railway Culture Park, Hall 1

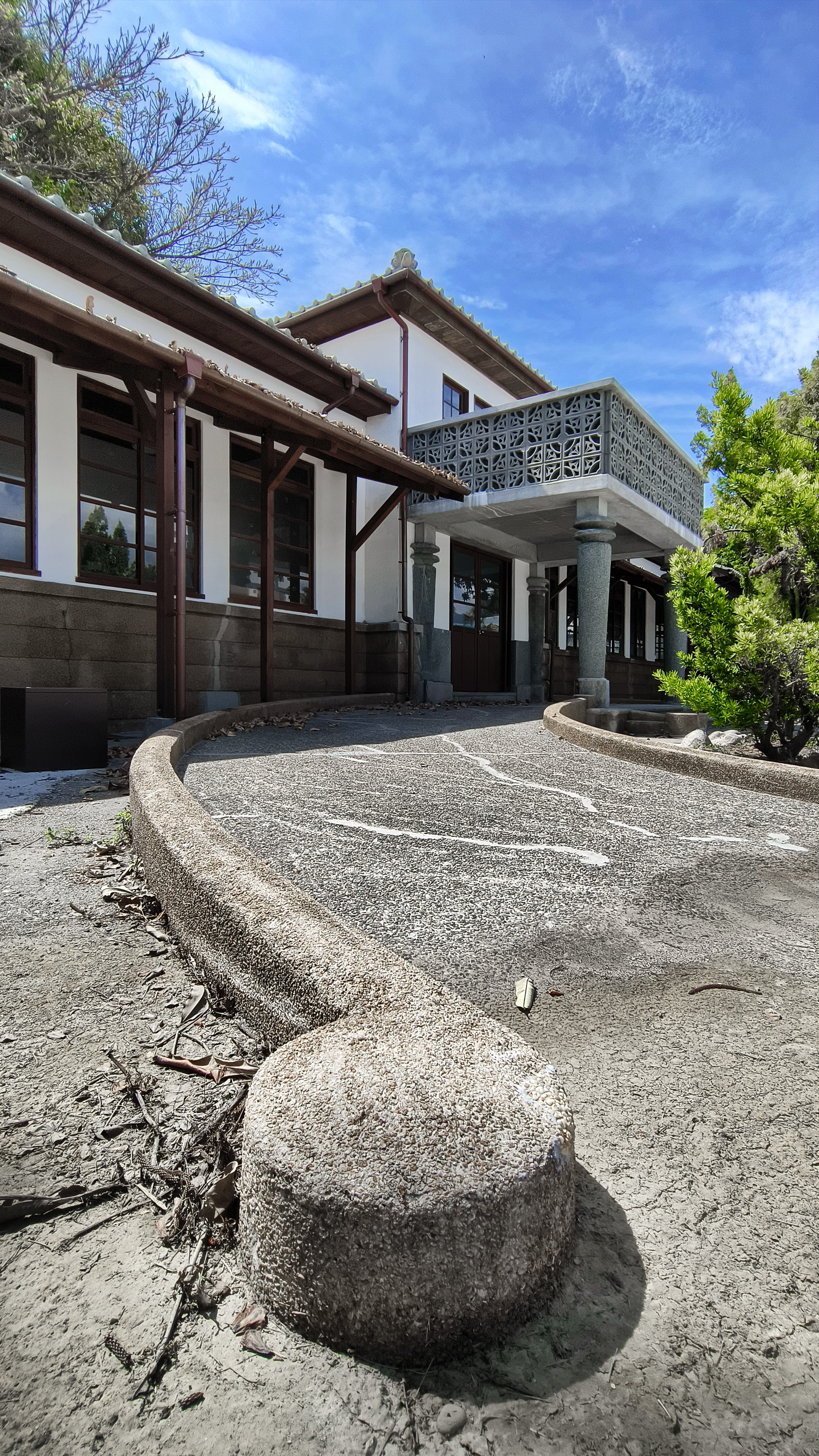
Former Hualien Railway Hospital

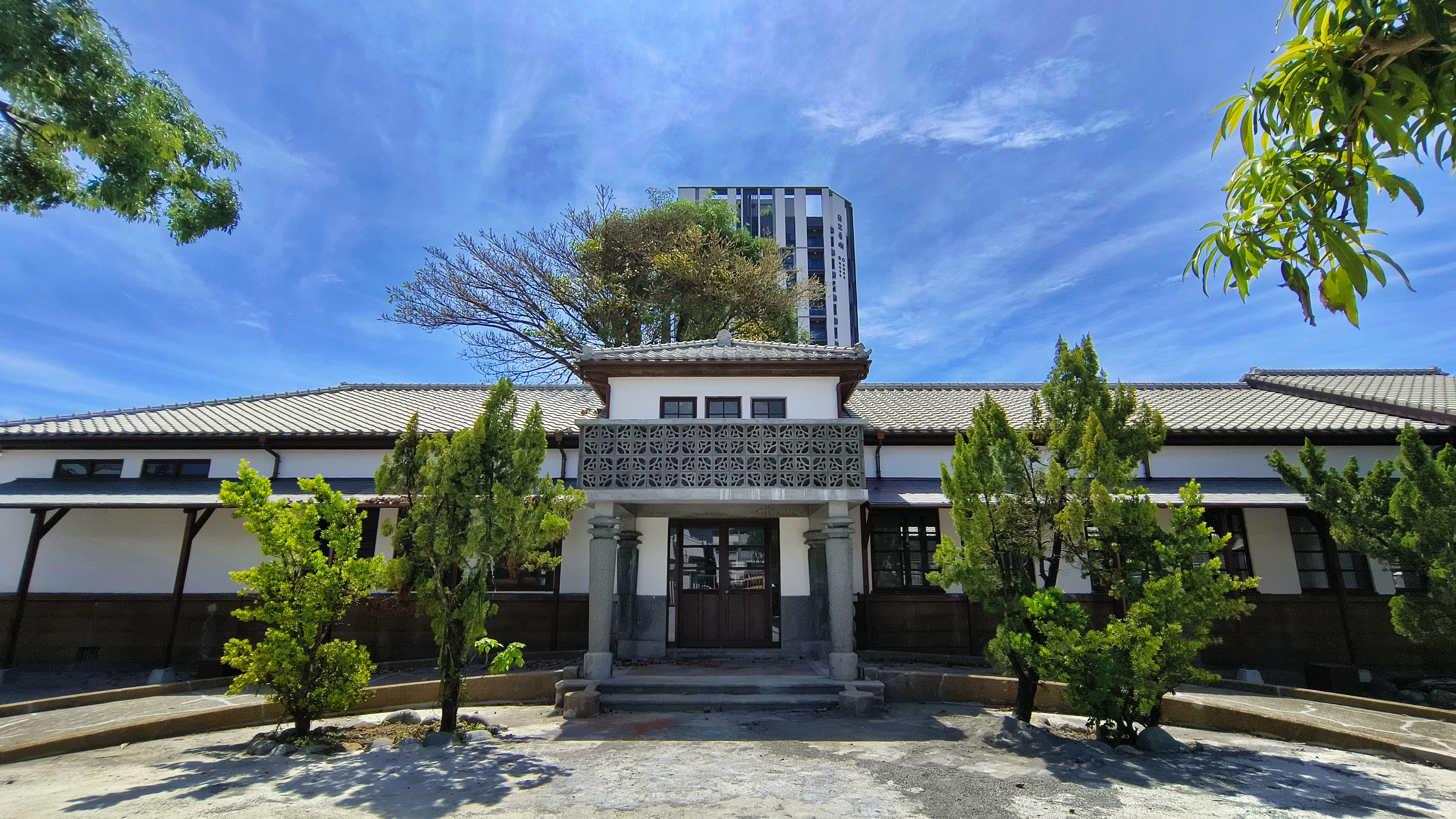
Former Hualien Railway Hospital

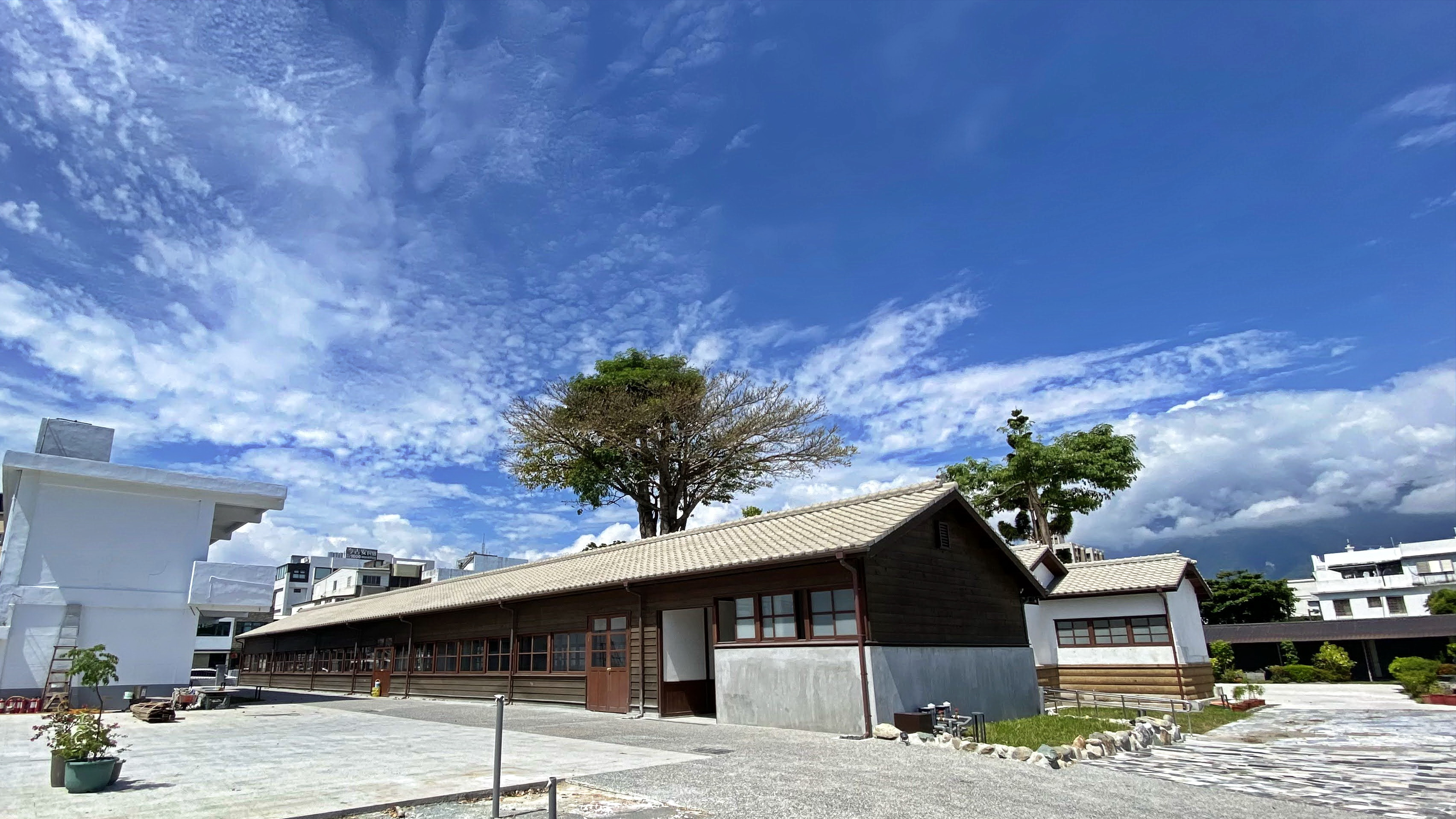
Former Hualien Railway Hospital

== See also ==
- List of tourist attractions in Taiwan
