= Hualien Cultural and Creative Industries Park =

Multipurpose park in Hualien City, Hualien County, Taiwan

- 花蓮文創產業園區
- Interactive map of the Hualien Cultural and Creative Industries Park area

General information
- Location: Hualien City, Hualien County, Taiwan
- Coordinates: 23°58′34″N 121°36′16.3″E
- Opened: May 2011

Technical details
- Floor area: 3.3 hectares

Website
- Official website (in Chinese)

The Hualien Cultural and Creative Industries Park (traditional Chinese: 花蓮文創產業園區; simplified Chinese: 花莲文创产业园区; pinyin: Huālián Wénchuàng Chǎnyè Yuánqū) is a multi-purpose park in Hualien City, Hualien County, Taiwan.

== History ==
The buildings in the area used to be constructed during the Japanese rule of Taiwan as the brewing site for red wine and rice wine for Yilan Distillery. The land to construct the park was obtained on 2 April 2011. In May 2011, the operation plan was reviews and the first phase of the park was opened in September 2011. On 2 October 2011, the park was 30% opened and trial operation began. The park was fully opened in 2015.

== Architecture ==
The park spans over an area of 3.3 hectares and consists of 26 old factory warehouses.

== Transportation ==
The park is accessible within walking distance south of Hualien Station of Taiwan Railway.

== Gallery ==
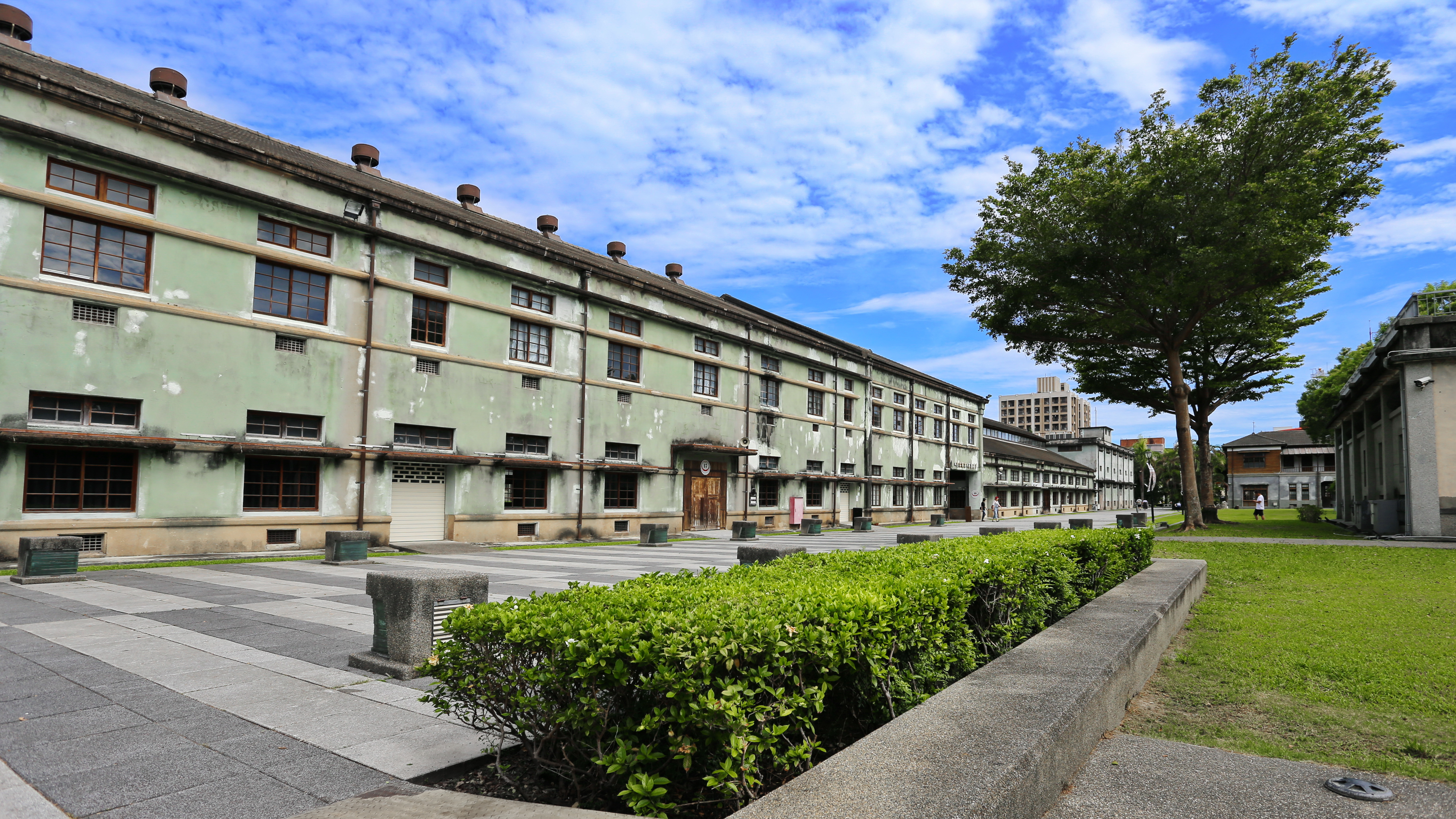

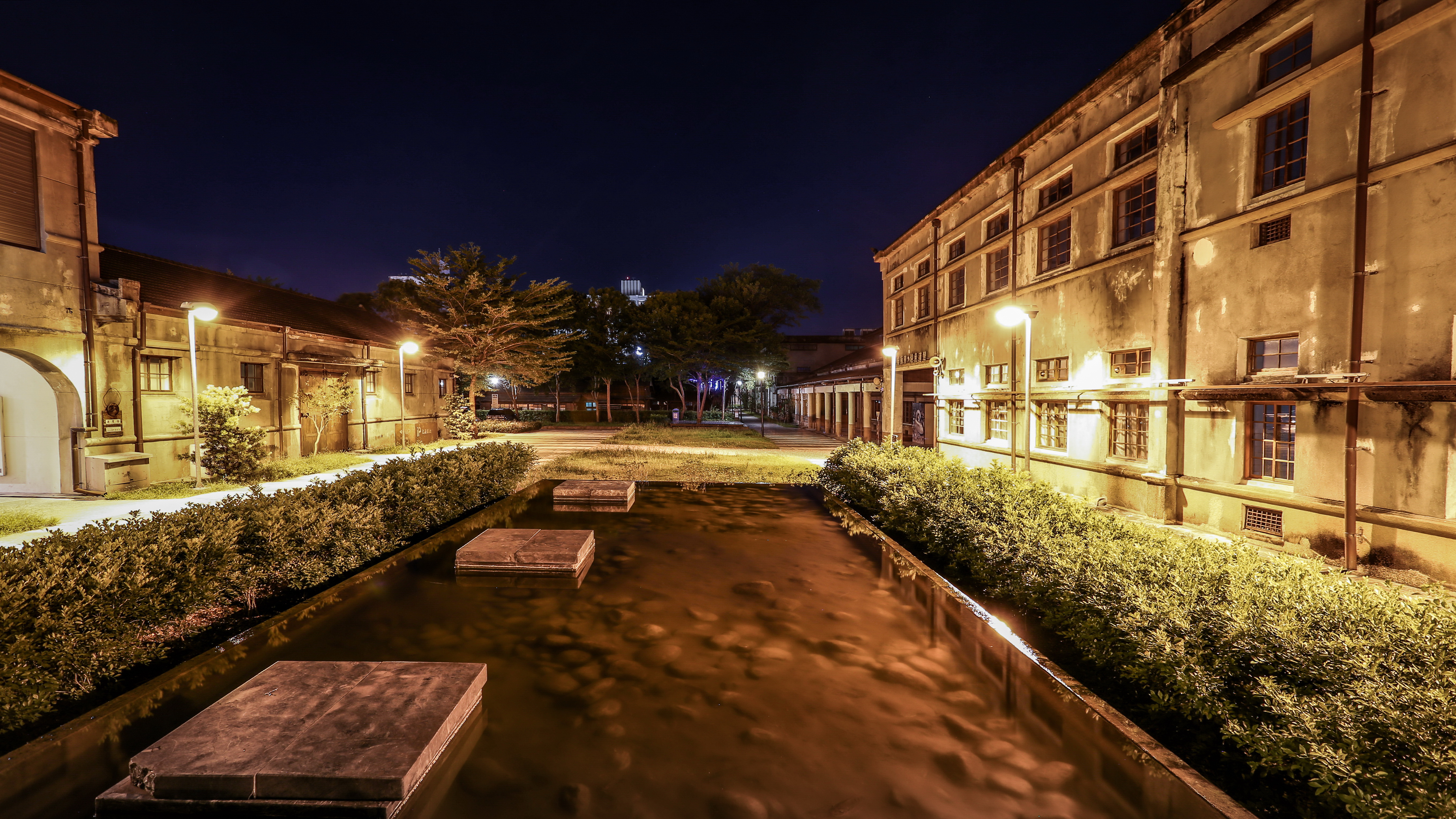

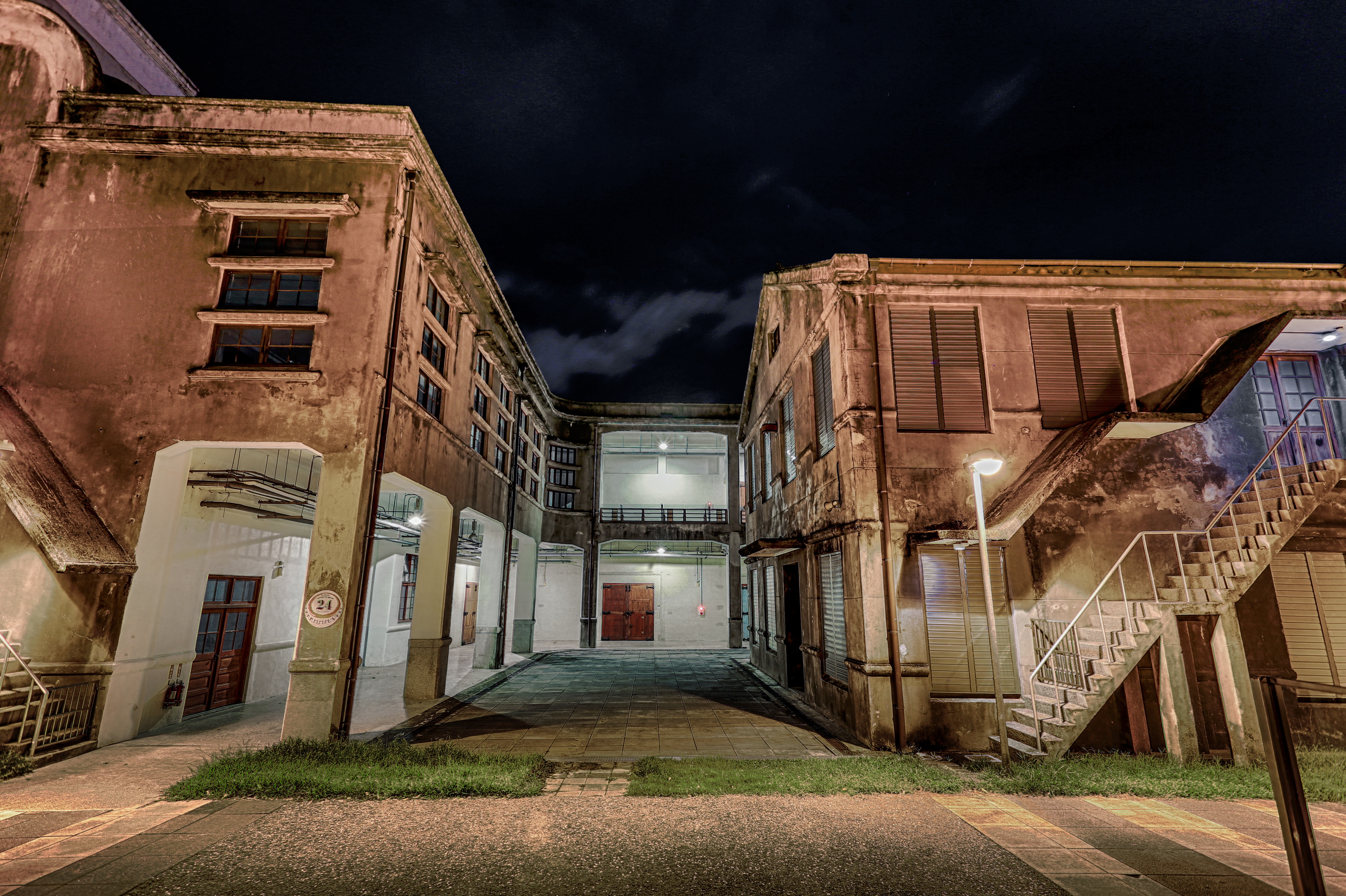

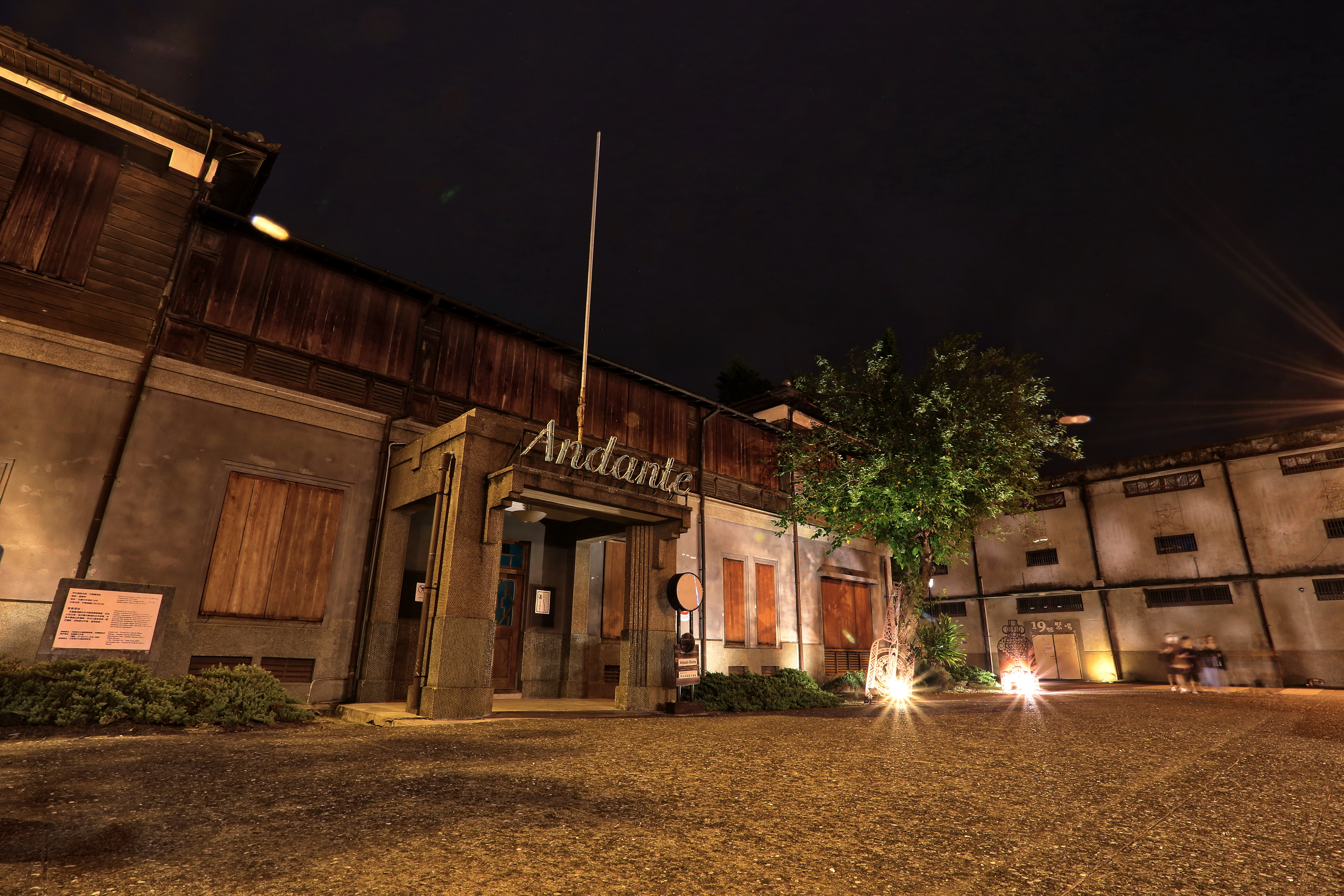

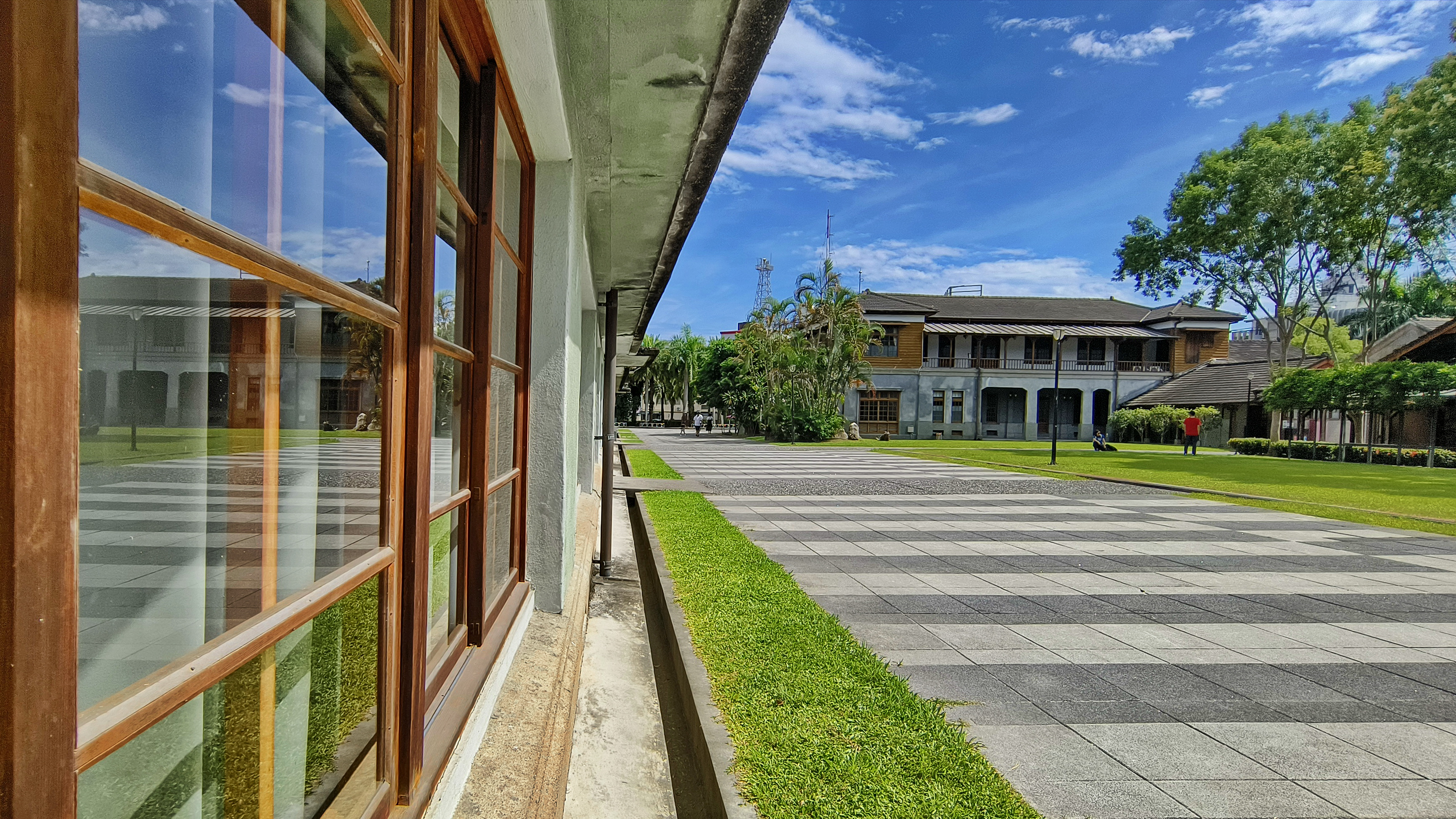

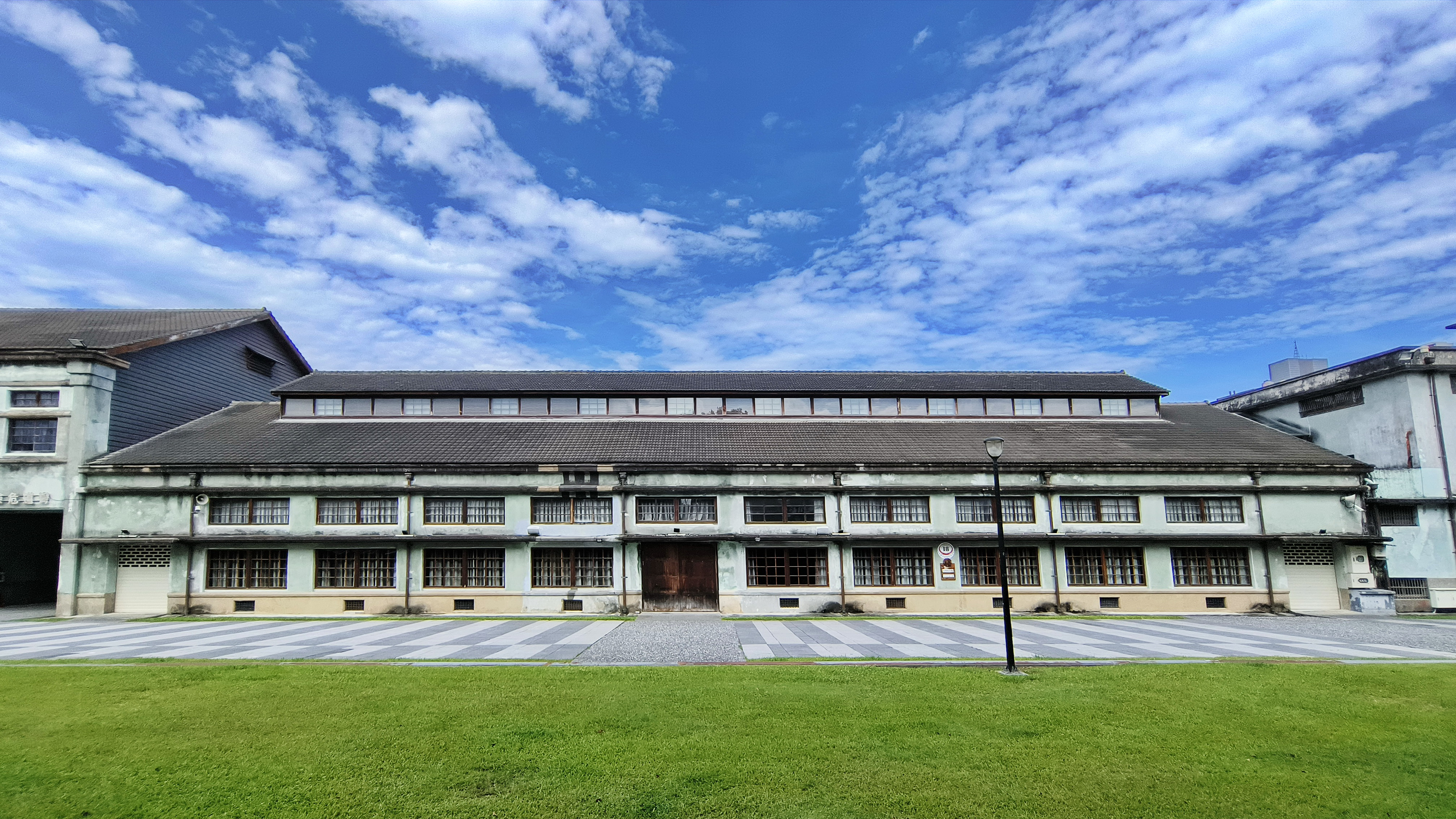

== See also ==
- List of tourist attractions in Taiwan
