= Pine Garden =

Former office in Hualien City, Hualien County, Taiwan

- 松園別館
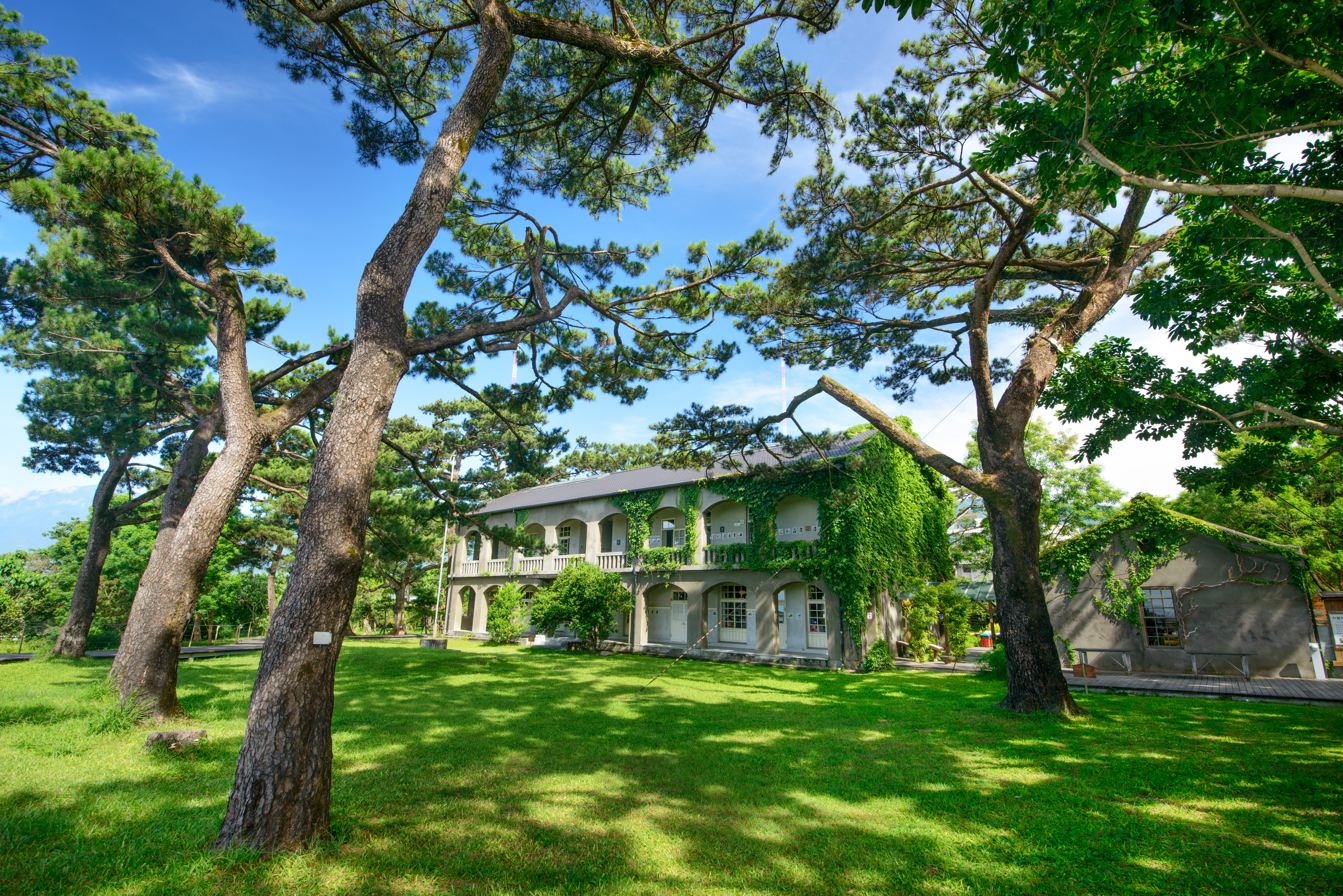
- Interactive map of the Pine Garden area

General information
- Type: former military office
- Location: Hualien City, Hualien County, Taiwan
- Coordinates: 23°58′57.4″N 121°36′55.5″E
- Completed: 1943

Website
- Official website (in Chinese)

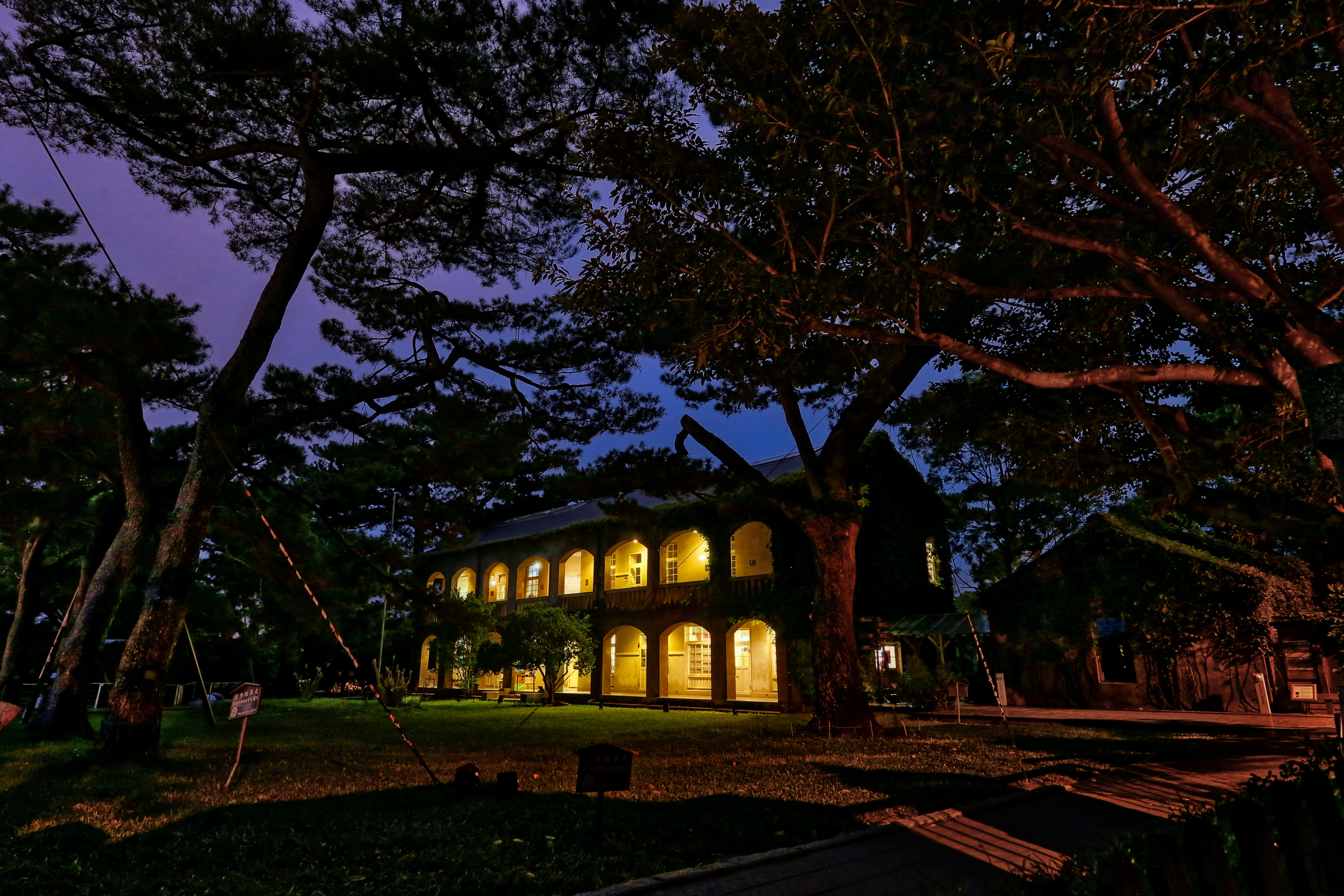
Pine Garden at night

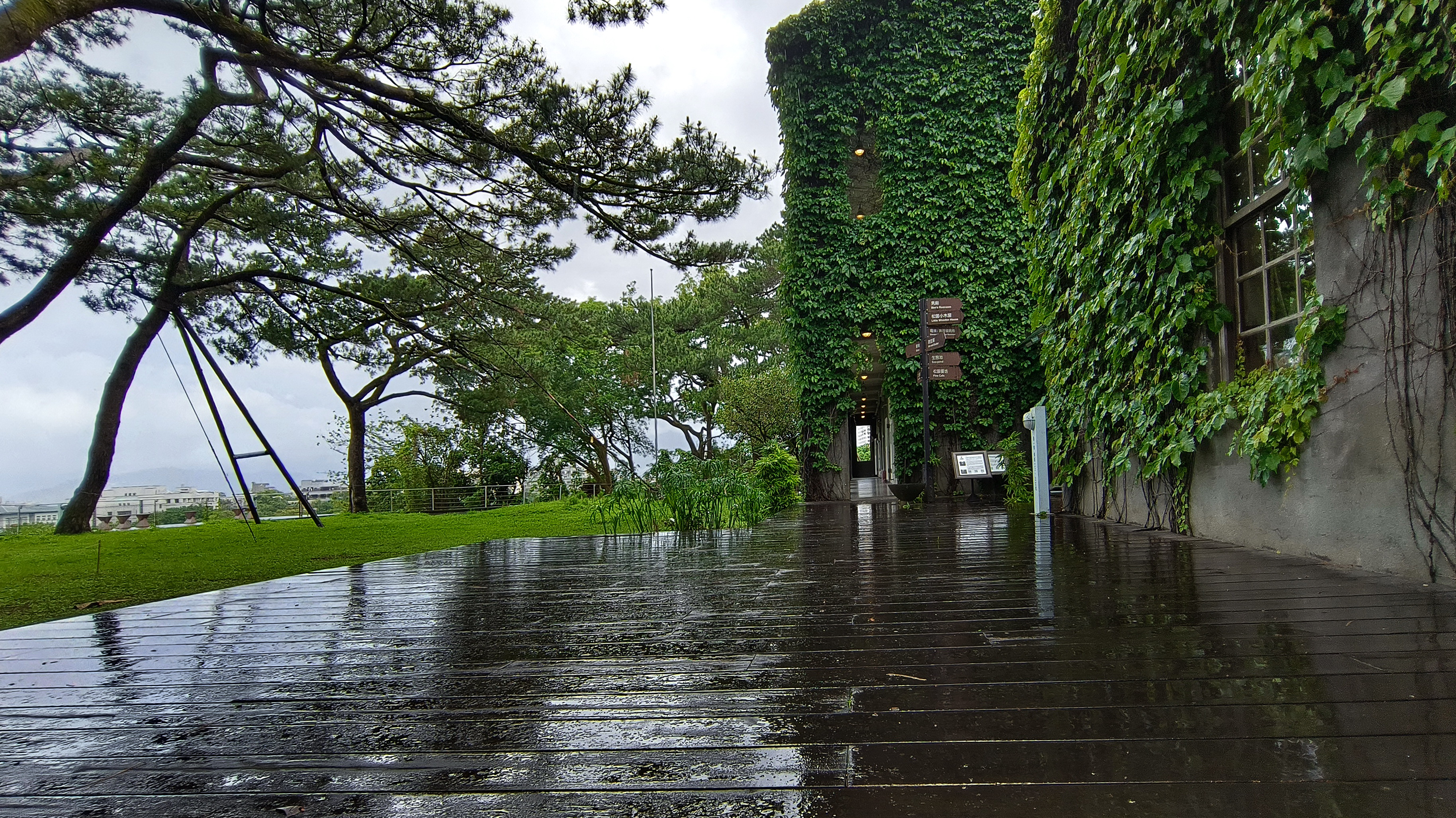
The Pine Garden

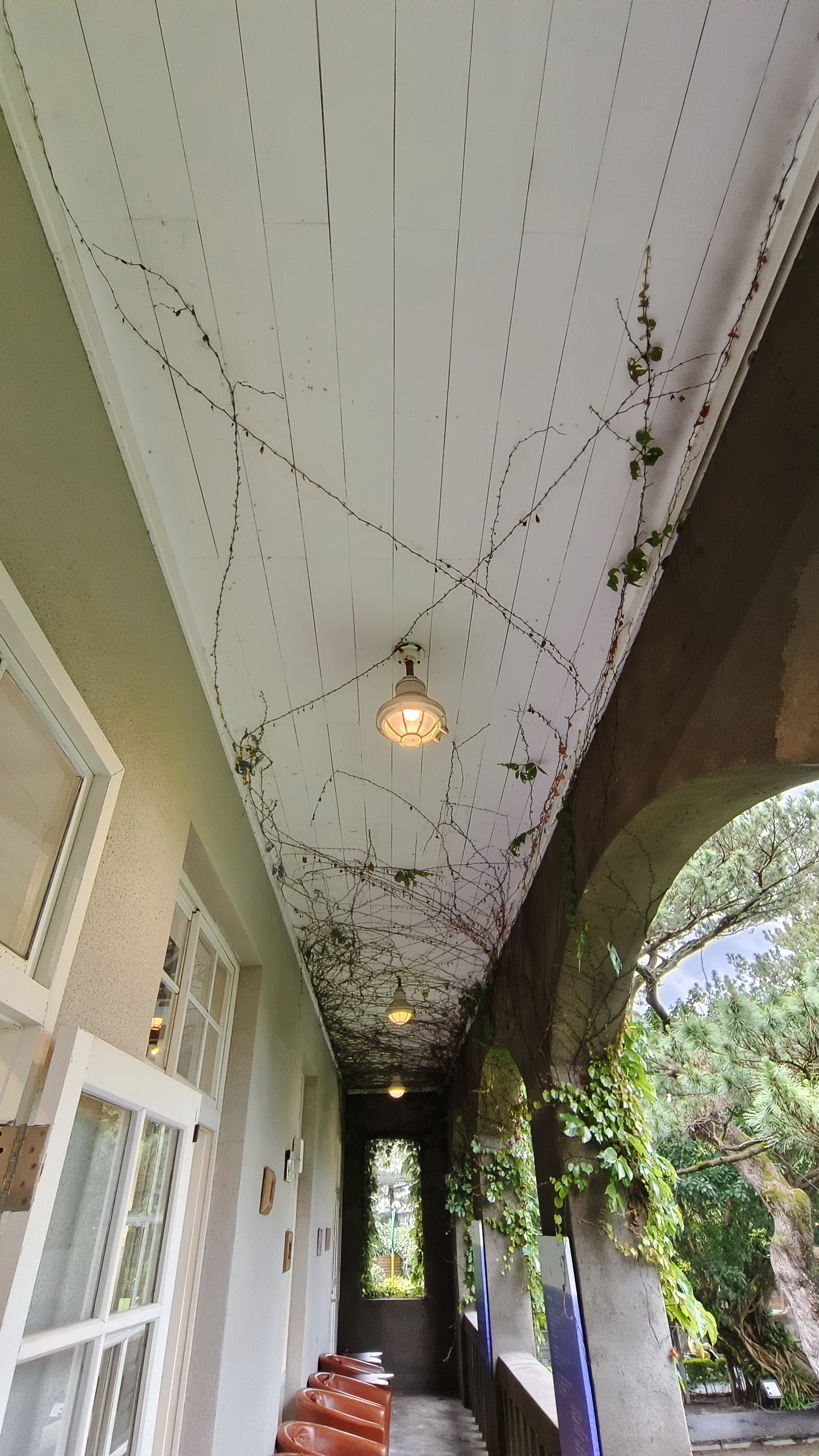
The Pine Garden

The Pine Garden (traditional Chinese: 松園別館; simplified Chinese: 松园别馆; pinyin: Sōngyuán biéguǎn) is a former Japanese military office in Hualien City, Hualien County, Taiwan.

== History ==
The area was built in 1943 during the Japanese rule as a military office. The building used to be located inside a pine forest, thus earning the name. After the handover of Taiwan from Japan to the Republic of China in 1945, the facility was used as a vacation resort for the United States Armed Forces. In 2000, the Hualien County Government designated the area as a historical building. The government has renovated it into a cultural center and the Council for Cultural Affairs opened it as a tourist attractions to the public in 2001.

== See also ==
- List of tourist attractions in Taiwan
