= Hualien County Council =

Legislature of Hualien County, Taiwan

Coordinates: 23.9941°N 121.6208°E

Hualien County Council 花蓮縣議會

Type
- Type: county Council

Leadership
- Speaker: Yang Wen-chi
- Deputy Speaker: Lai Ching-kun

Structure
- Seats: 33
- Political groups: KMT (13); DPP (3); TPP (1); Independent (15)

Elections
- Voting system: Single non-transferable vote
- Last election: 2022

Meeting place
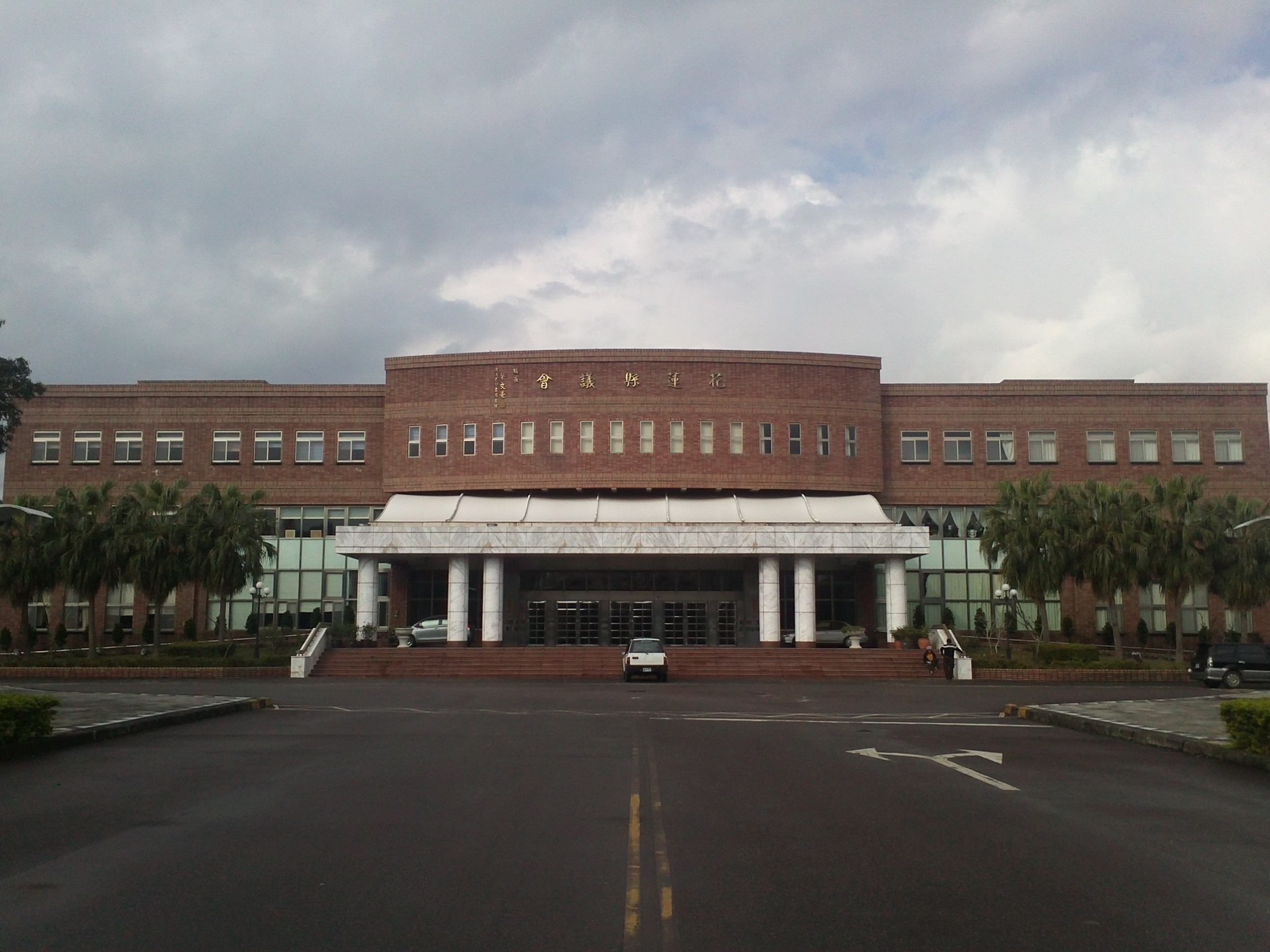
- The Building of Hualien County Council; Hualien City, Hualien County, Taiwan

Website
- Official website (in Chinese)

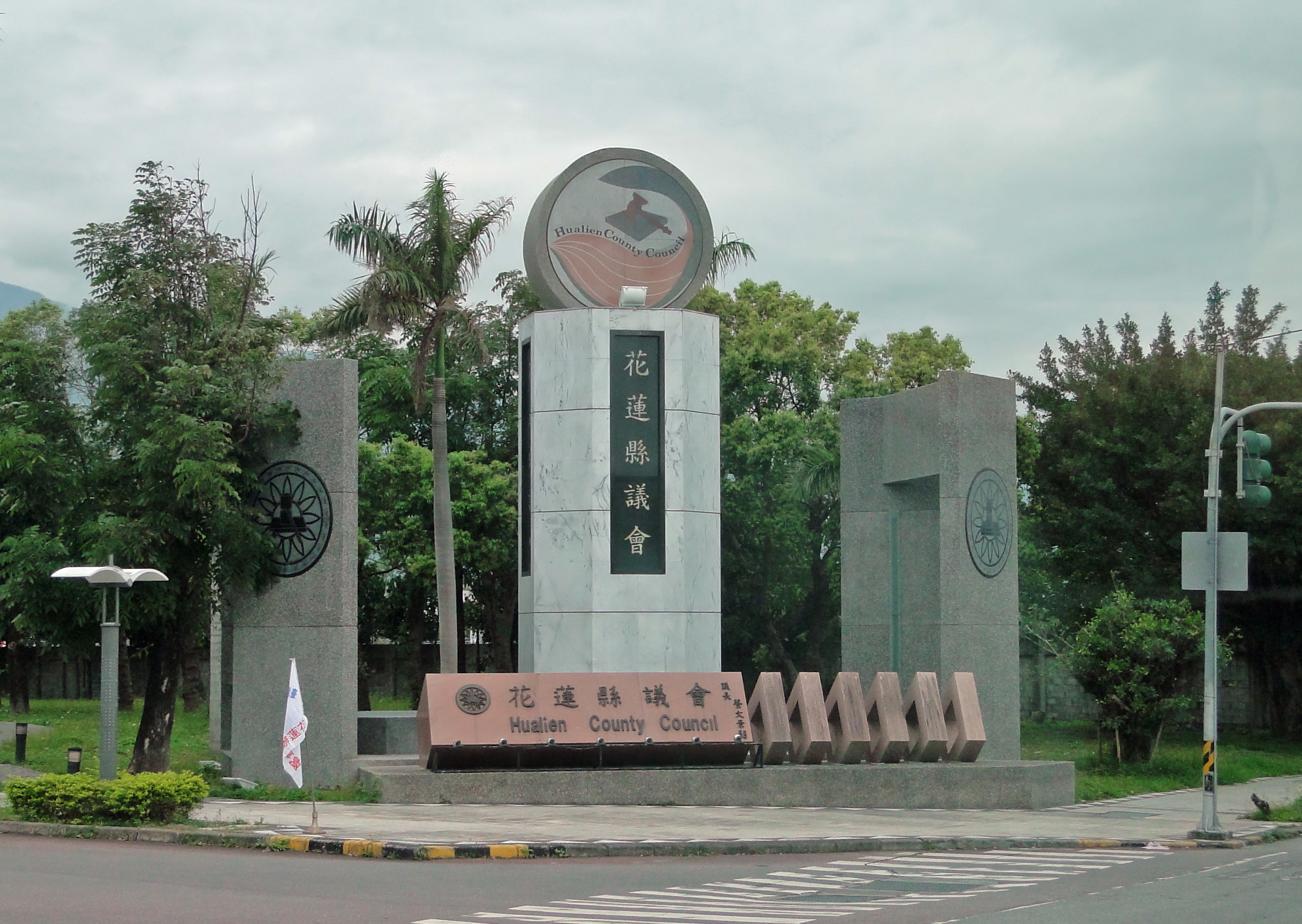
HLCC entrance gate

The Hualien County Council (HLCC; traditional Chinese: 花蓮縣議會; simplified Chinese: 花莲县议会; pinyin: Huālián Xiàn Yìhuì; Wade–Giles: Hua^{1}-lien^{2} Hsien^{4} I^{4}-hui^{4}) is the elected county council of Hualien County, Republic of China. The council is composed of 33 councilors lastly elected through the 2022 local elections on 26 November 2022.

== Transportation ==
The council building is accessible within walking distance east from Hualien Station of Taiwan Railway.

== See also ==
- Hualien County Government
