= Hualien City =

City in Taiwan

Hualien 花蓮市 Kalingko
- County-administered city
- Hualien City
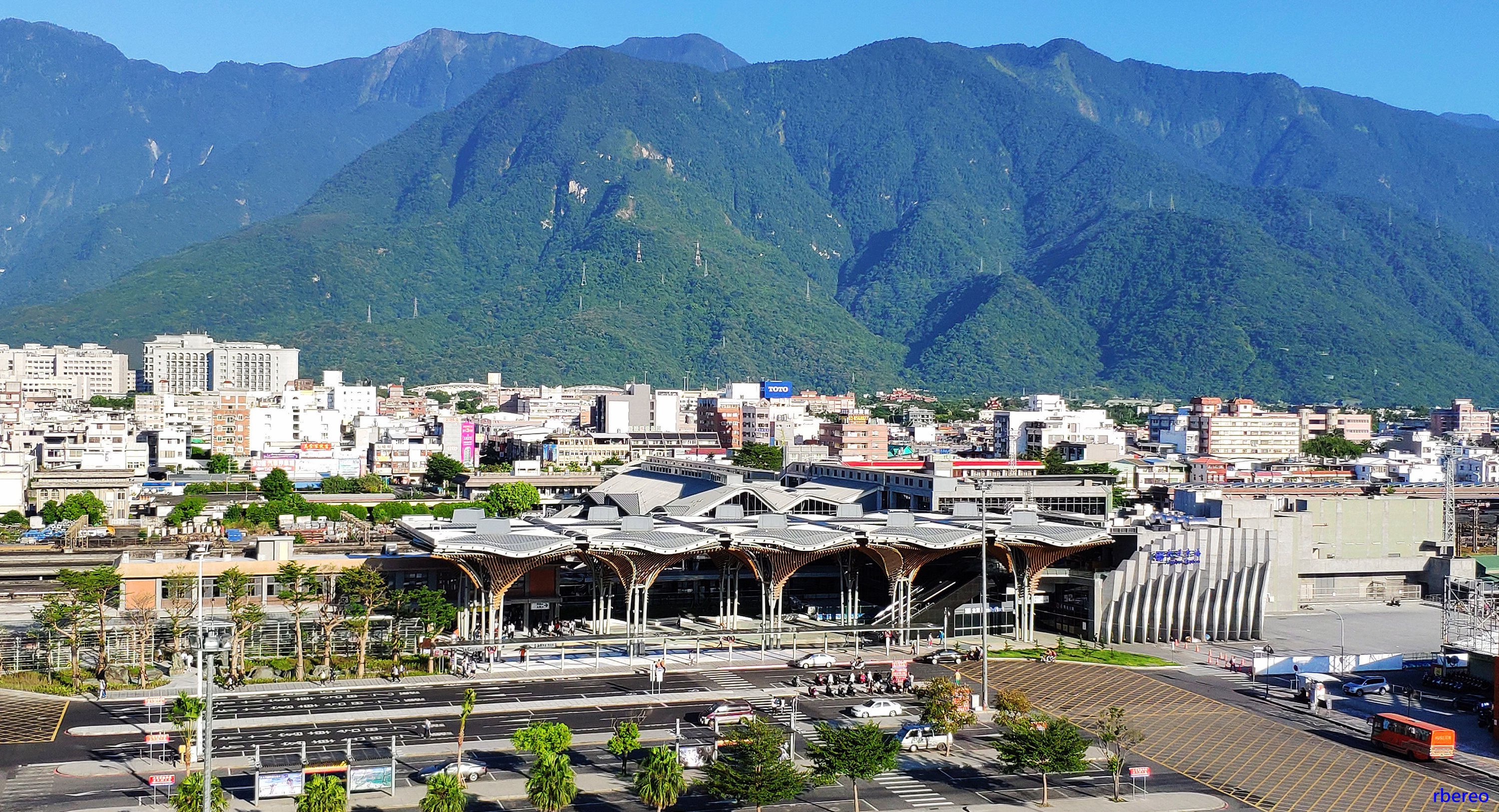
- Hualien City
- Nickname: Huashi (花市)
- Hualien City
- Interactive map of Hualien
- Location in Taiwan
- Coordinates: 23°58′20″N 121°36′23″E
- Country: Taiwan
- Province: Taiwan Province (nominal)
- County: Hualien County

Government
  - Type: County-administered city
  - Mayor: Wei Chia-hsien (KMT)

Area
  - Total: 29.41 km^{2} (11.36 sq mi)

Population (March 2023)
  - Total: 99,458
  - Density: 3,382/km^{2} (8,759/sq mi)
- Time zone: UTC+8 (CST)
- Post code: 970
- Subdivision: 45 boroughs
- Website: www.hualien.gov.tw

Hualien City
- Traditional Chinese: 花蓮市
Transcriptions
Standard Mandarin
- Hanyu Pinyin: Huālián Shì
- Bopomofo: ㄏㄨㄚ ㄌㄧㄢˊ ㄕˋ
- Gwoyeu Romatzyh: Hualian Shyh
- Wade–Giles: Hua¹-lien² Shih⁴
- Tongyong Pinyin: Hualián Shìh
- Yale Romanization: Hwālyán Shr̀
- MPS2: Huālián Shr̀
- IPA: [xwá.ljɛ̌n ʂɻ̩̂]
Hakka
- Pha̍k-fa-sṳ: Fâ-lièn-sṳ
Southern Min
- Hokkien POJ: Hoa-lian-chhī or Hoa-liân-chhī
- Tâi-lô: Hua-lian-tshī or Hua-liân-tshī

Hualien (Mandarin pinyin: Huālián Shì; Wade-Giles: Hua¹-lien² Shih⁴; Hokkien POJ: Hoa-lian-chhī or Hoa-liân-chhī; Amis: Kalingko) is a county-administered city and the county seat of Hualien County, Taiwan. It is located on the east coast of Taiwan on the Pacific Ocean, and has a population of 99,458 inhabitants.

== Name ==
Hualien County annals (花蓮縣志) record that the city was called "Kilai" (Chinese: 奇萊; Pe̍h-ōe-jī: Kî-lâi) until the early twentieth century. This name refers to the Sakiraya Taiwanese aborigines and their settlement.

After Taiwan came under Japanese rule in 1895 its governors sought to change the name because "Kilai" is pronounced the same as the Japanese word for "dislike" (嫌い, kirai). The name was eventually changed to Karen Harbour (Japanese: 花蓮港, Hepburn: Karenkō). After World War II the incoming Kuomintang-led Republic of China retained the Kanji spelling but shortened the name to just Karen (花蓮), or Hualien via Chinese romanization.

== History ==
The Spaniards built mines for gold in Hualien in 1622. Permanent settlements began in 1851, when 2,200 Han Chinese farmers led by Huang A-fong (黃阿鳳) from Taipei arrived at Fengchuan (now the area near Hualien Rear Station). In 1875, more farmers, led by Lin Cang-an (林蒼安) from Yilan, settled at Fengchuan.

Settlements in the area remained small by the start of Japanese rule. The city was expanded circa 1912 by its Japanese governor to incorporate Guohua (國華) and Guoan (國安) Villages, a region later known as Old New Port (舊新港街). In 1920, Karenkō Town (花蓮港街) was established, and around 1923 it was extended to Riran Port (鯉浪港), today known as "New Port" (新港), including the Guowei and Guoji Villages. In 1940, the town was upgraded to Karenkō City, Karenkō Prefecture.

On 25 October 1945, Taiwan was handed over from Japan to the Republic of China under Kuomintang government. In January 1946, the incoming Kuomintang designated Hualien City a county-administered city of Hualien County and to be the county seat.

On 3 April 2024, a major earthquake struck near Hualien.

== Subdivisions ==
The 45 villages (里) of the city are divided into six village unions (聯合里): (in Hanyu Pinyin)

1. The first union: Minyun (民運), Minle (民樂), Minxiang (民享), Minyi (民意), Minxin (民心), Minli (民立), Minde (民德), Minzheng (民政), Minqin (民勤), Minxiao (民孝)
2. The second union: Minsheng (民生), Minquan (民權), Minzu (民族), Minyou (民有), Minzhu (民主), Minzhi (民治)
3. The third union: Zhuji (主計), Zhuyi (主義), Zhuxin (主信), Zhuqin (主勤), Zhushang (主商), Zhugong (主工)
4. The fourth union: Zhuxue (主學), Zhuquan (主權), Zhunong (主農), Zhuhe (主和), Zhuli (主力), Zhu'an (主安), Zhumu (主睦)
5. The fifth union: Guofeng (國風), Guofang (國防), Guozhi (國治), Guoguang (國光), Guohun (國魂), Guo'an (國安), Guowei (國威), Guohua (國華), Guolian (國聯), Guosheng (國盛)
6. The sixth union: Guofu (國富), Guoyu (國裕), Guoqing (國慶), Guoqiang (國強), Guofu (國福), Guoxing (國興)

The newest villages from 2002 are Guosheng, Guoxing, Minxiao, and Minzhu.

== Government institutions ==
- Hualien County Government
- Hualien County Council

== Demographics ==
As of 2020, Hualien City had 12,855 aboriginal people, accounting for 12.48% of the total population of the city. The majority of the aborigines that reside in Hualien include the Amis, Atayal, Truku and Bunun. Hualien City is also the most densely populated area in Hualien county.

== Climate ==
Hualien experiences a tropical monsoon climate (Am) with frequent cyclones, as it borders the Pacific Ocean. It closely borders on a humid subtropical climate (Cfa) with the average temperature of the coldest month being just above 18 °C, as well as a tropical rainforest climate (Af) with the driest month's precipitation narrowly missing the 60 mm mark. The city experiences significant rainfall year-round and the temperature there averages 23.4 °C (74.1 °F). Precipitation in the city averages 2,177 mm (85.7 in). January is the city's driest month, while September tends to be the wettest.

Climate data for Hualien (1991–2020 normals, extremes 1910–present）
Month	Jan	Feb	Mar	Apr	May	Jun	Jul	Aug	Sep	Oct	Nov	Dec	Year
Record high °C (°F)	29.6 (85.3)	30.6 (87.1)	31.2 (88.2)	33.6 (92.5)	34.3 (93.7)	34.7 (94.5)	36.3 (97.3)	37.4 (99.3)	35.2 (95.4)	37.0 (98.6)	32.3 (90.1)	29.6 (85.3)	37.4 (99.3)
Mean daily maximum °C (°F)	21.4 (70.5)	21.9 (71.4)	23.6 (74.5)	26.2 (79.2)	28.7 (83.7)	30.9 (87.6)	32.4 (90.3)	32.2 (90.0)	30.7 (87.3)	28.3 (82.9)	25.8 (78.4)	22.8 (73.0)	27.1 (80.7)
Daily mean °C (°F)	18.3 (64.9)	18.6 (65.5)	20.3 (68.5)	22.8 (73.0)	25.3 (77.5)	27.3 (81.1)	28.7 (83.7)	28.4 (83.1)	27.0 (80.6)	24.9 (76.8)	22.5 (72.5)	19.7 (67.5)	23.7 (74.6)
Mean daily minimum °C (°F)	15.8 (60.4)	16.2 (61.2)	17.6 (63.7)	20.1 (68.2)	22.5 (72.5)	24.7 (76.5)	25.6 (78.1)	25.4 (77.7)	24.2 (75.6)	22.2 (72.0)	19.9 (67.8)	17.2 (63.0)	21.0 (69.7)
Record low °C (°F)	4.6 (40.3)	4.4 (39.9)	8.7 (47.7)	9.6 (49.3)	14.6 (58.3)	16.8 (62.2)	20.1 (68.2)	19.8 (67.6)	16.9 (62.4)	12.5 (54.5)	8.1 (46.6)	6.5 (43.7)	4.4 (39.9)
Average precipitation mm (inches)	54.6 (2.15)	74.7 (2.94)	76.7 (3.02)	76.6 (3.02)	186.9 (7.36)	165.5 (6.52)	198.5 (7.81)	258.8 (10.19)	329.9 (12.99)	350.6 (13.80)	175.1 (6.89)	83.6 (3.29)	2,031.5 (79.98)
Average rainy days	13.4	14.2	14.2	14.1	15.8	11.6	8.2	10.4	13.2	12.5	12.4	11.2	151.2
Average relative humidity (%)	75.6	76.9	77.4	78.9	80.2	80.4	77.1	78.0	77.8	75.2	75.7	74.0	77.3
Mean monthly sunshine hours	68.7	67.8	85.7	98.1	124.3	180.9	255.6	228.0	163.1	124.3	93.2	74.2	1,563.9
Source: Central Weather Bureau

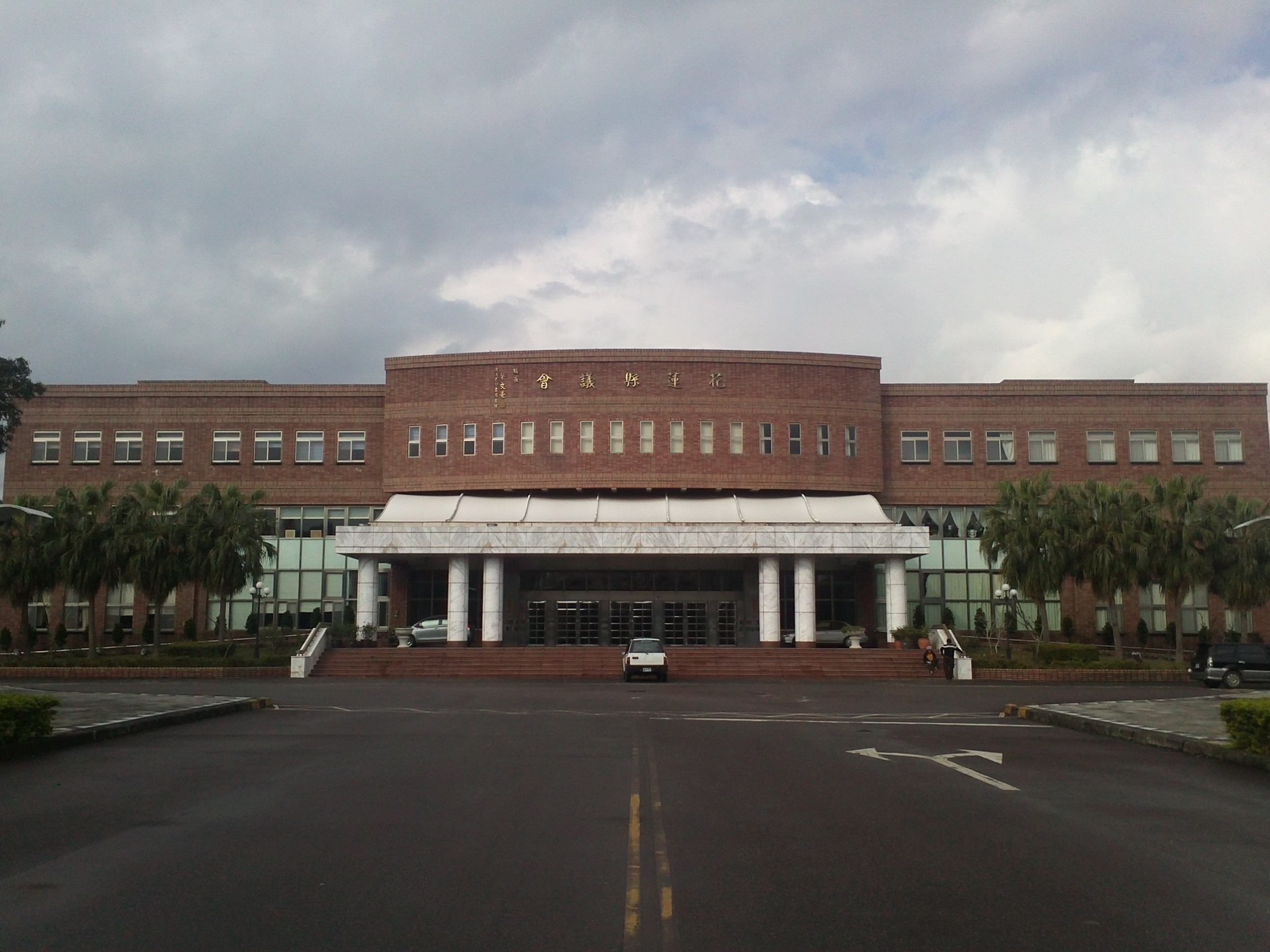
Hualien County Council

== Education ==
There are 3 universities, 12 senior high schools, 4 junior high schools, 16 elementary schools.

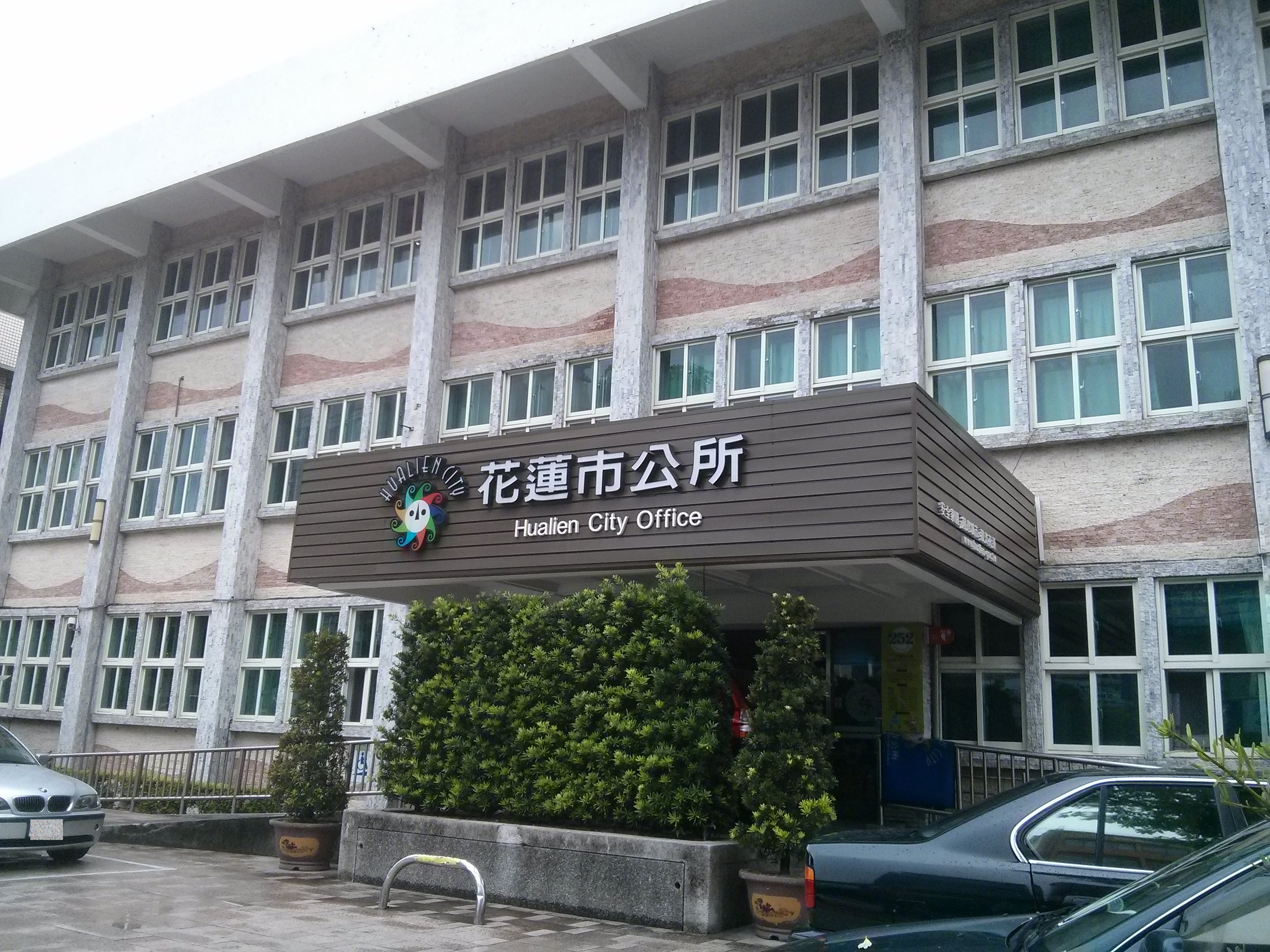
Hualien City Office

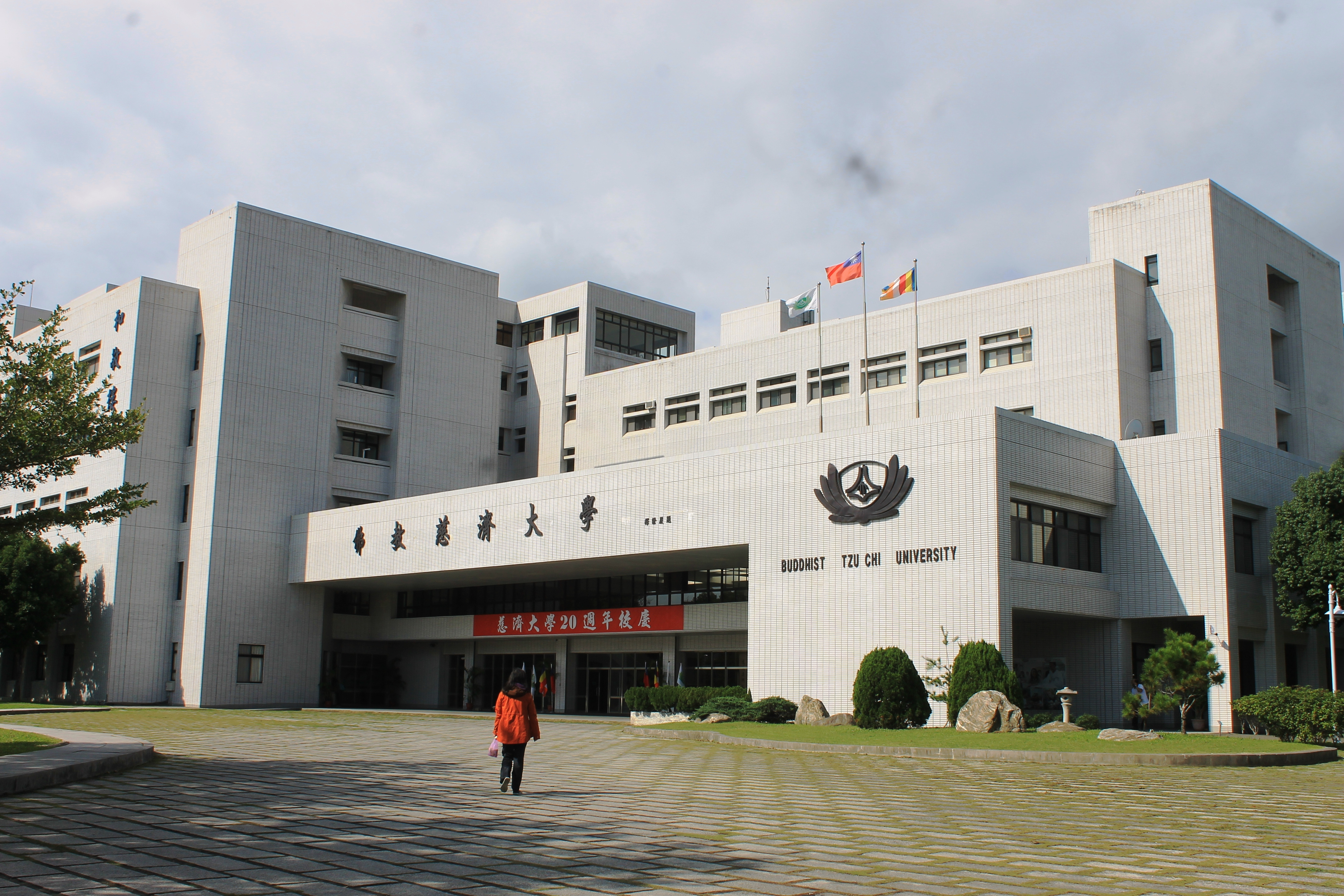
Tzu Chi University

=== Universities ===
- National Dong Hwa University, Meilun campus
- Tzu Chi University

=== High schools ===
- National Hualien Senior High School
- National Hualien Girls' Senior High School
- Tzu Chi High School

== Industries ==
Hualien City is the center of politics, economy and transportation of Hualien County.

== Medical care ==
- Hualien Tzu Chi Medical Center (First Medical Center in Eastern Taiwan)
- Mennonite Christian Hospital
- Hualien Hospital, Department of Health, Execusive Yuan

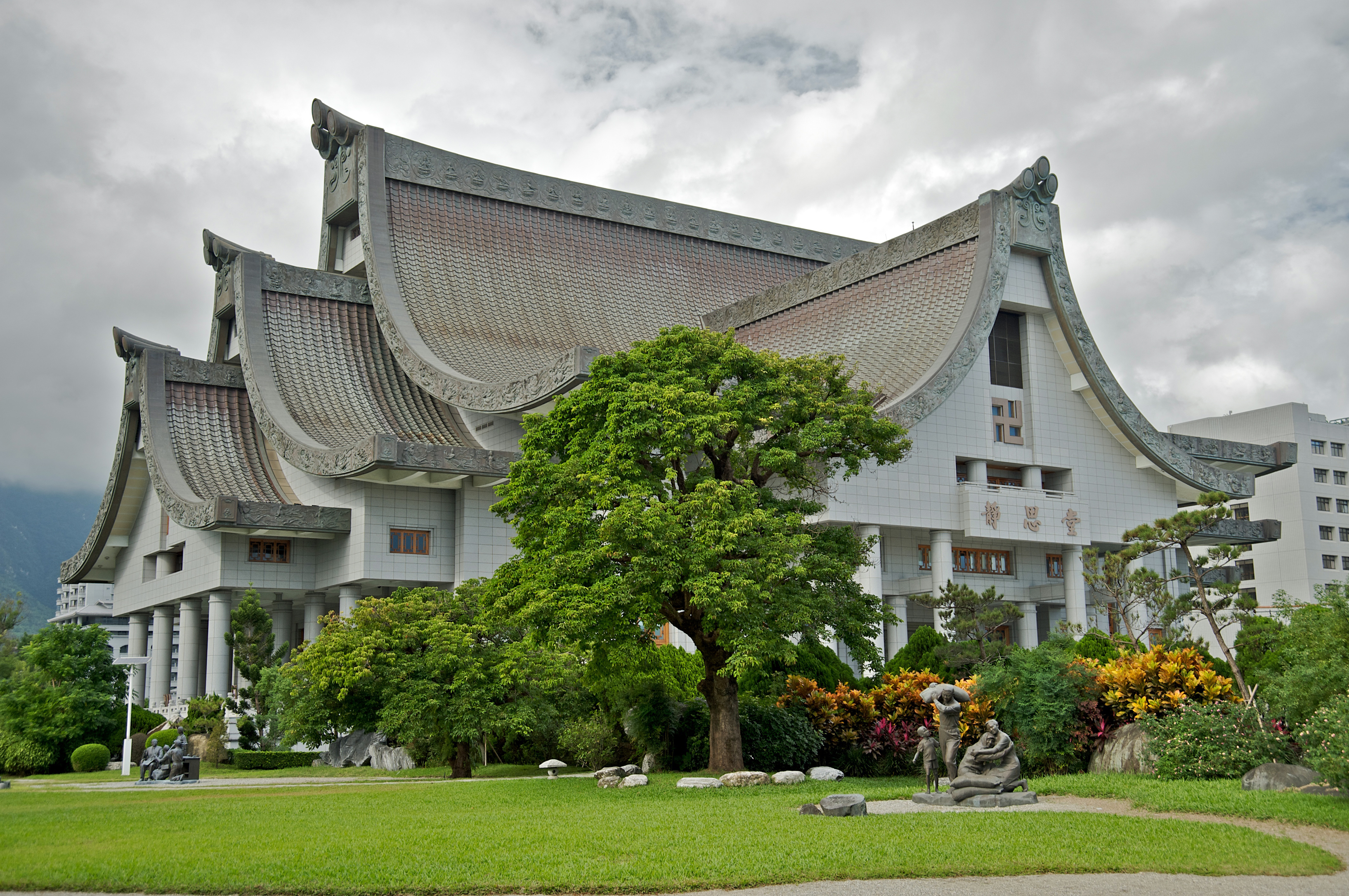
Jing Si Hall of the Tzu Chi Foundation

== Tourist attractions ==
Giant Mickey Mouse sculpture at the entrance of Meilunshan Park

Hualien is most famous as the jumping off point for Taroko Gorge National Park. Taroko Gorge is billed as the largest marble canyon in the world. Tours from Hualien City are available in large bus tours or smaller group or private tours. Taroko Gorge features suspension bridges, trails, rivers, waterfalls and more.

- Dongdamen Night Market
- Hualien Baseball Stadium
- Hualien County Stone Sculptural Museum
- Hualien Cultural and Creative Industries Park
- Hualien Martyrs' Shrine
- Hualien Railway Culture Park
- Mickey Mouse sculpture
- Pine Garden
- North Beach Park (Beibin Park)
- South Beach Park and Night Market (Nanbin Park)
- Meilun Mountain Park
- Hualien Fish Market
- Old Railroad Cultural Shopping Street
- Rock Street
- Whale Watching
- Jing Si Hall (Meditation Hall) of the Tzu Chi Foundation
- Gong Tian Temple

== Transportation ==
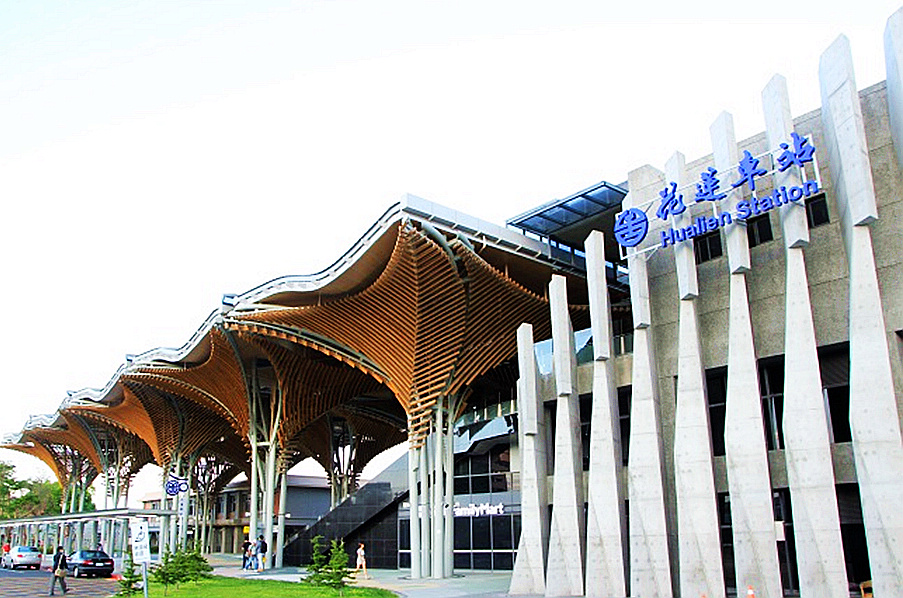
Hualien Station

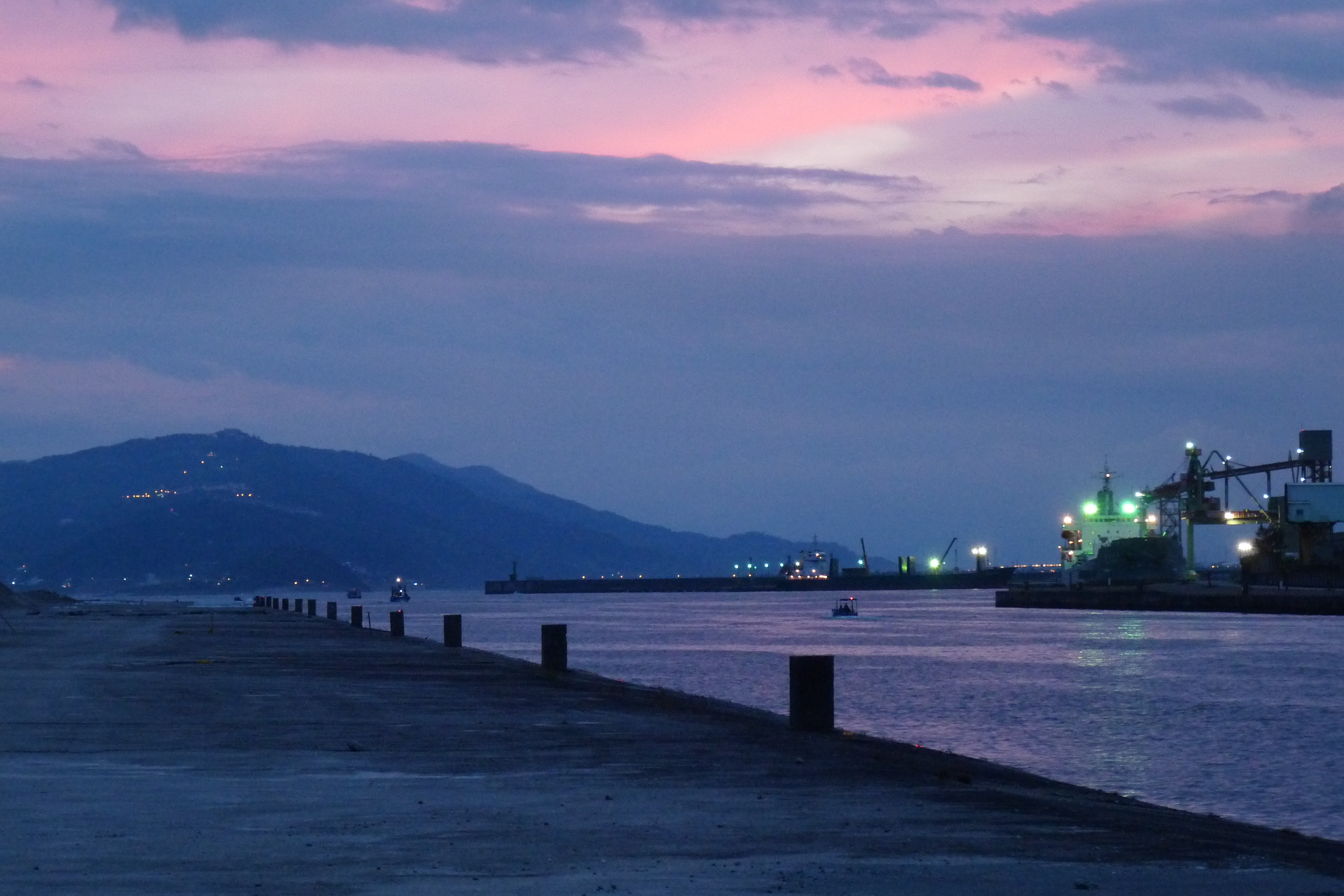
Port of Hualien

=== Air ===
Hualien City is served by Hualien Airport located at the neighboring Xincheng Township of Hualien County. The airport is about 10 minutes drive to the city.

=== Rail ===
- Hualien Station, Taiwan Railway North-Link Line and Hualien–Taitung Line

=== Sea ===
The Port of Hualien is an international port in the city with liners sailing to Japan, Middle East, Southeast Asia and South Korea.

=== Road ===
- Provincial Highway No. 9
- Provincial Highway No. 11
- County Road No.193

== Notable natives ==
- Hsieh Chia-hsien, baseball player
- Huang Teng-hui, artist and entrepreneur
- Lin Man-ting, football and futsal player
- Chuu-Lian Terng, mathematician
- Yeh Kuang-shih, Deputy Mayor of Kaohsiung (2018–2020)
- Yang Mu, poet, writer

== Gallery ==
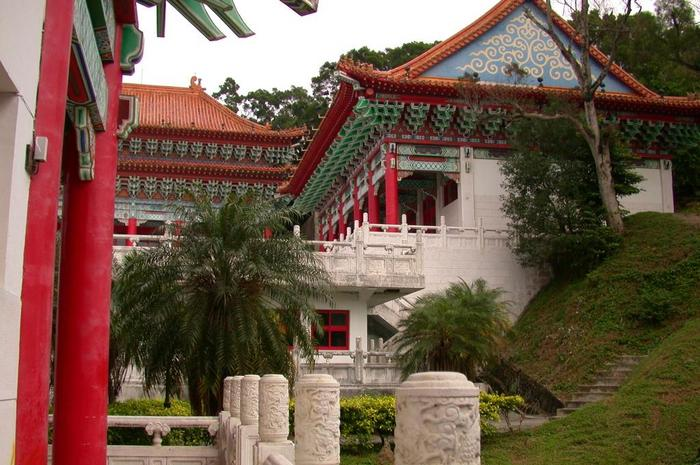
Martyrs' shrine in Hualien

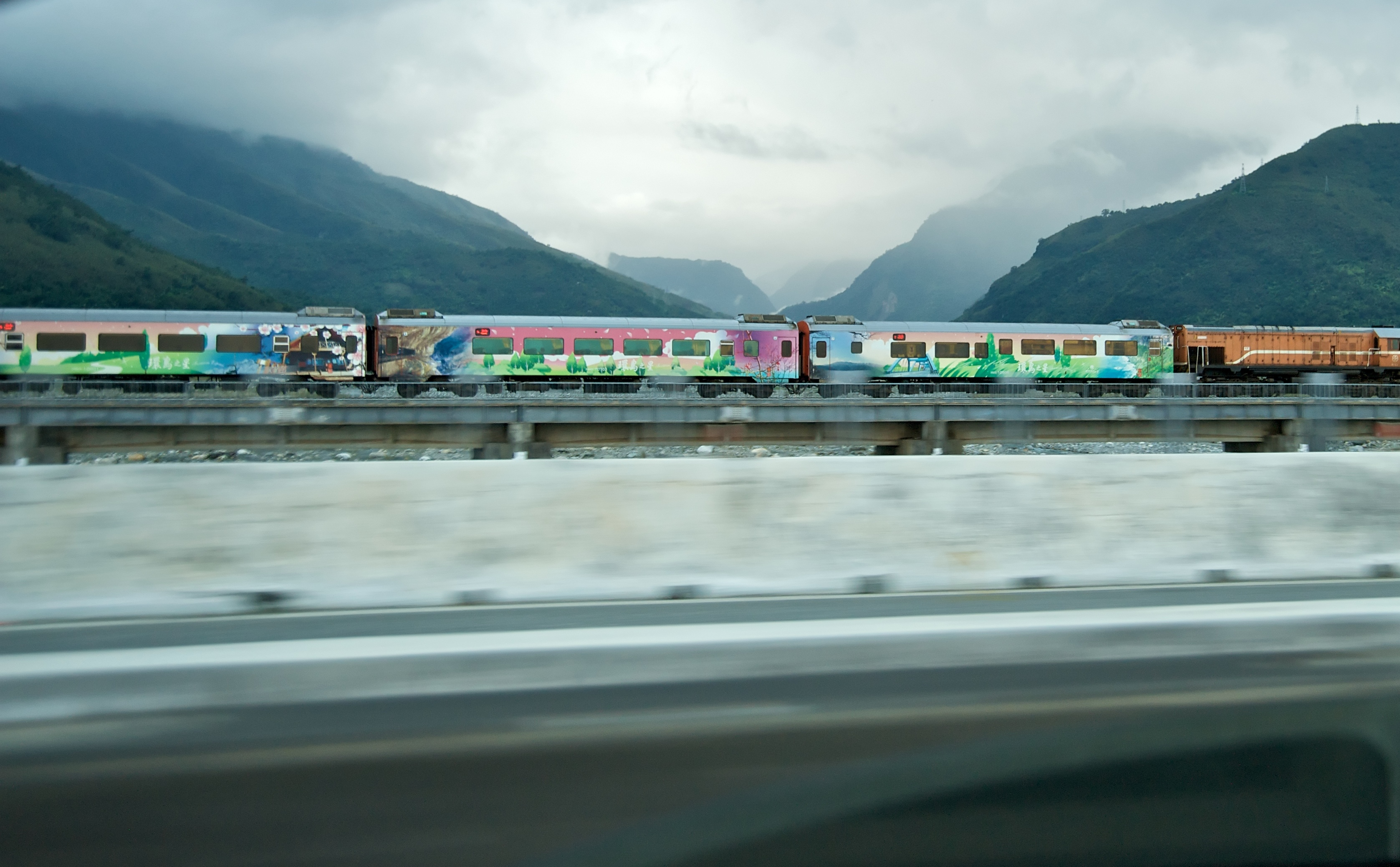
Formosa Express tourist train

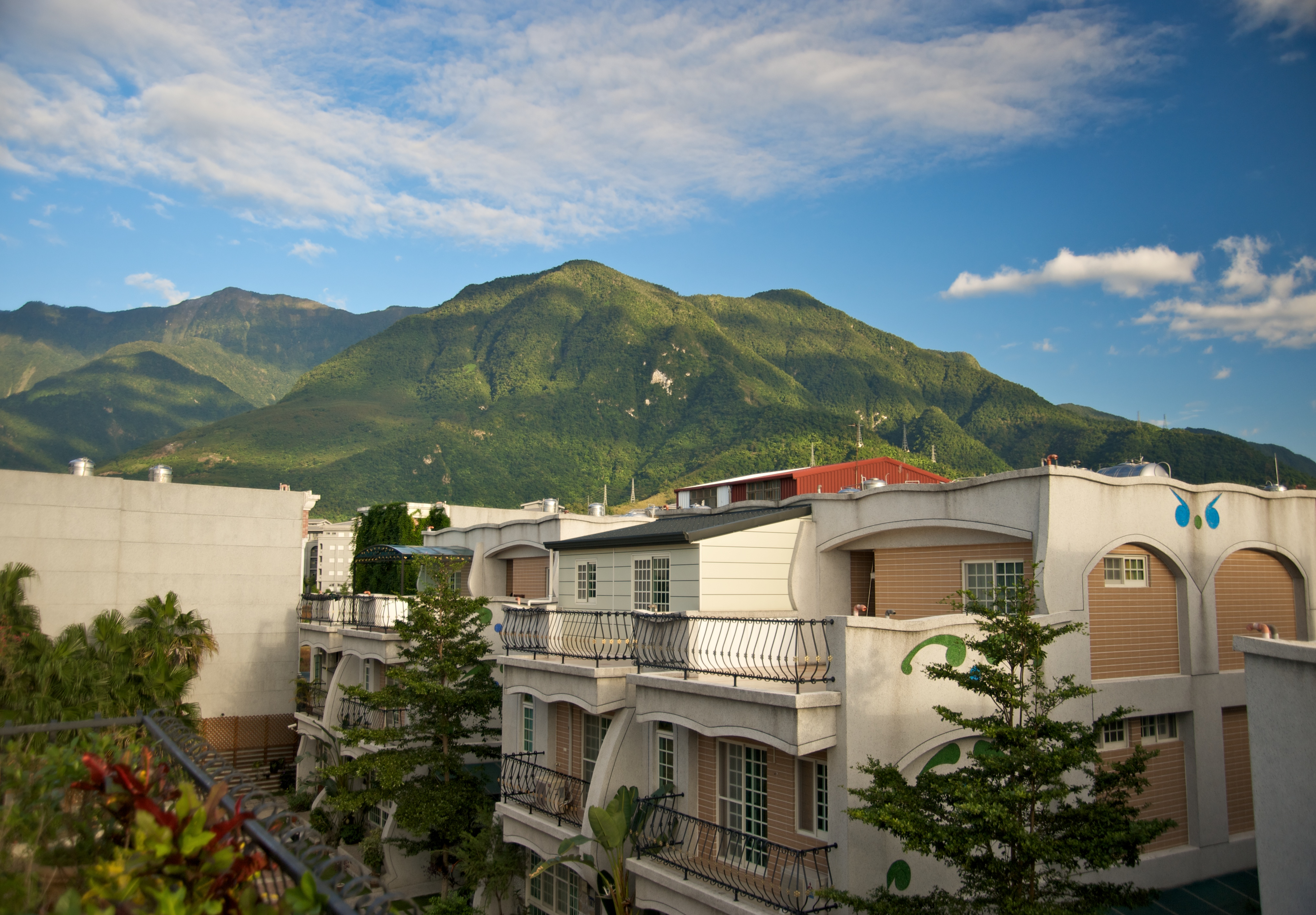
Residential community

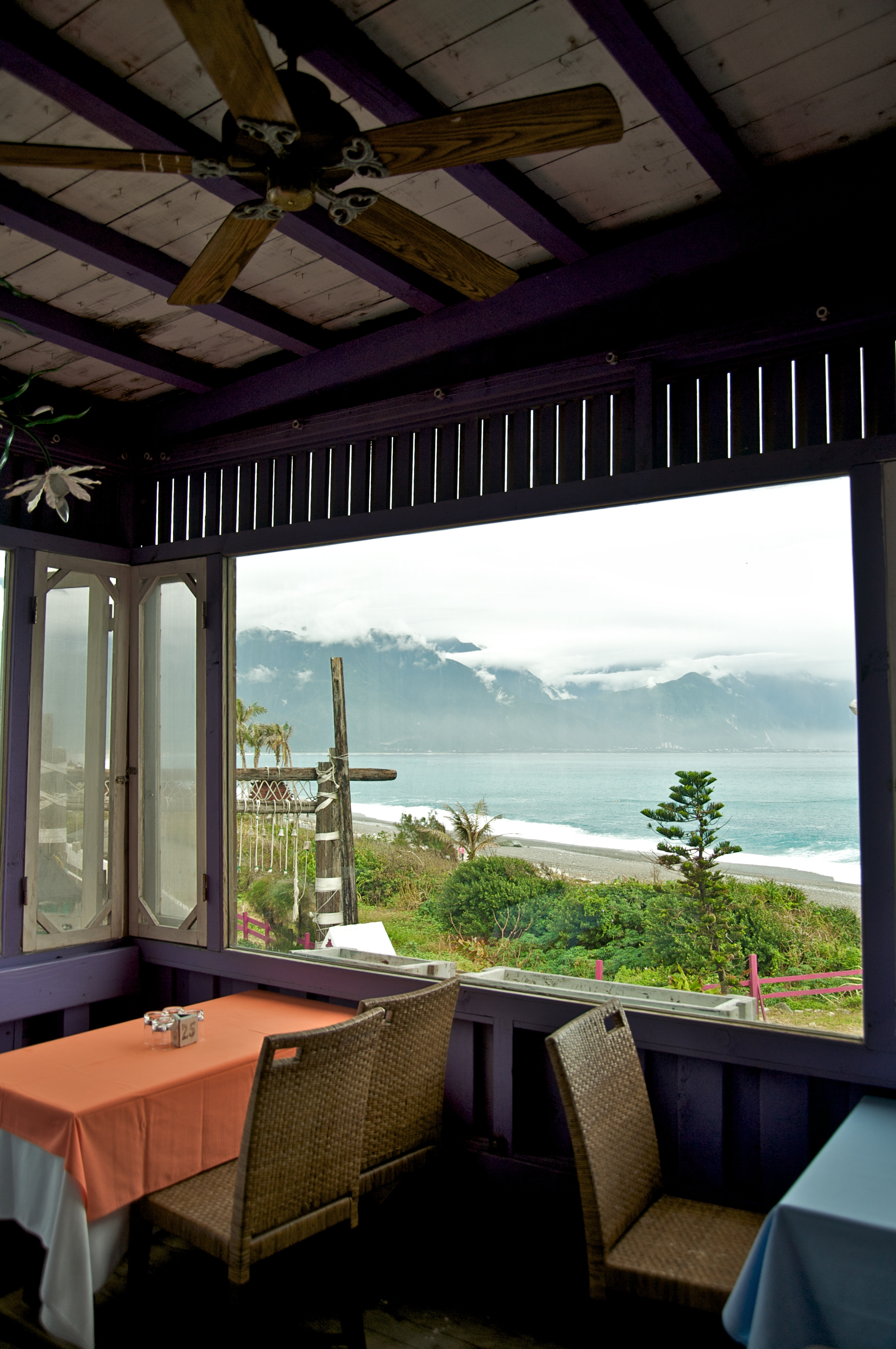
Yuan Yeh Resort

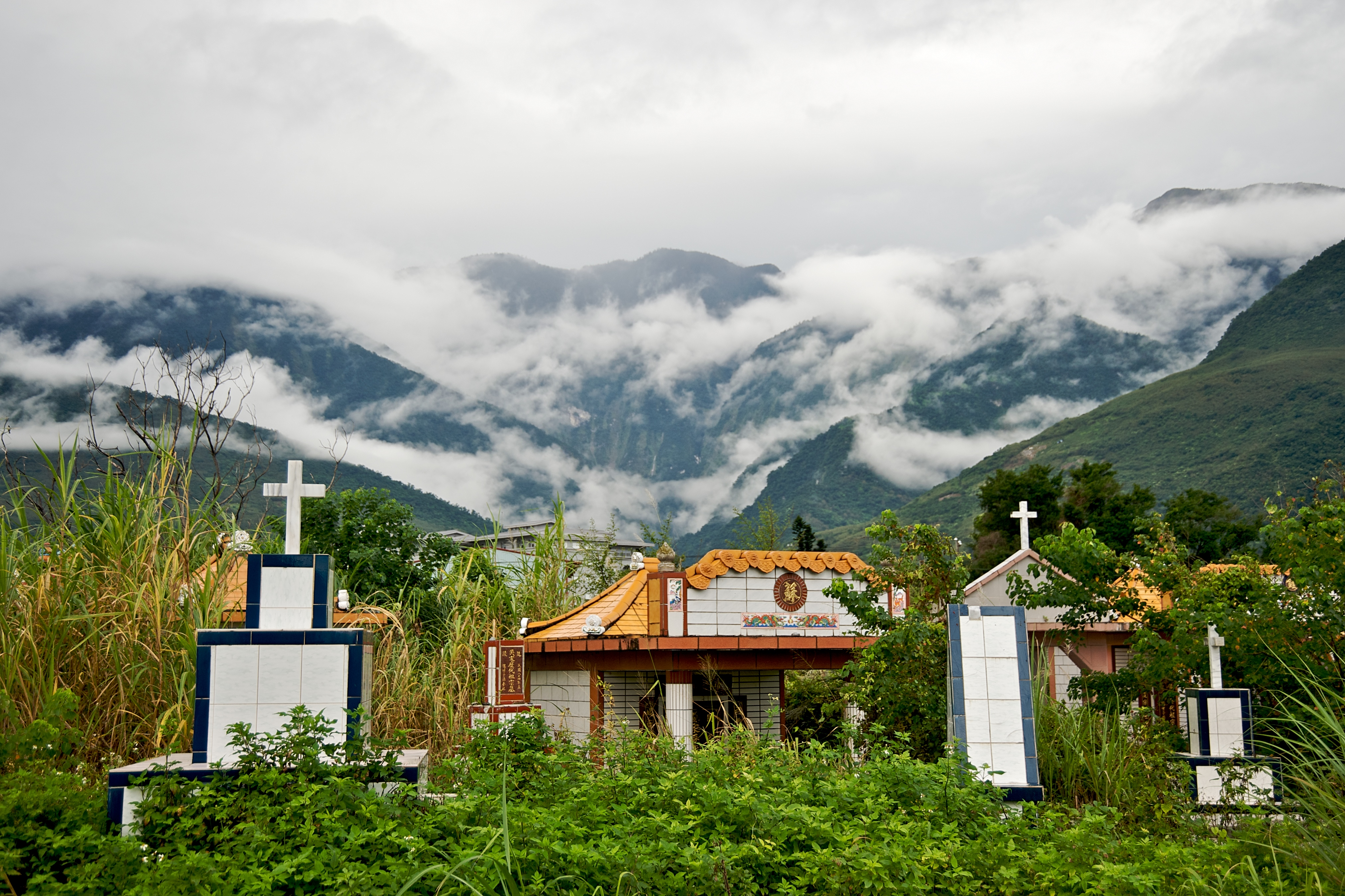
Roadside cemetery

== Twin towns – sister cities ==
Hualien City is twinned with:

- Ulsan, South Korea (1982)
- Yonaguni, Japan (1982)
- Albuquerque, United States (1983)
- Bellevue, United States (1984)
- Oudtshoorn, South Africa (1985)
- Calabanga, Philippines (2023)

=== Friendly cities ===
Hualien City has friendly relations with:

- Takachiho, Japan (2005)
- Saipan, Northern Mariana Islands, United States (2007)

== See also ==
- List of East Asian ports
- 2018 Hualien earthquake
