= Hualien County Stone Sculptural Museum =

Museum in Hualien City, Hualien County, Taiwan

- 花蓮縣石雕博物館
- Established: 2001
- Location: Hualien City, Hualien County, Taiwan
- Coordinates: 23°59′22″N 121°37′42″E
- Type: museum
- Website: Official website

The Hualien County Stone Sculptural Museum (traditional Chinese: 花蓮縣石雕博物館; simplified Chinese: 花莲县石雕博物馆; pinyin: Huālián Xiàn Shídiāo Bówùguǎn) is a museum of stone sculpture in Hualien City, Hualien County, Taiwan.

== History ==
The museum was opened in 2001 as the first stone sculpture museum in Taiwan.

== Architecture ==
The museum is a two-story building constructed with Shimizu form work and piled stones. The building has a modern architecture with high ceilings. The museum building also hosts the head office of Hualien County Cultural Affairs Bureau.

== Exhibitions ==
The museum includes the following exhibition areas:

- Collection area
- Exhibition area
- Modern stone sculpturing area
- Traditional stone sculpturing area
- Video and audio area

== Transportation ==
The museum is accessible by bus from Hualien Station of Taiwan Railway.

== See also ==
- List of museums in Taiwan
