= Hualien railway station =

Railway station in Hualien, Taiwan

Hualien 花蓮
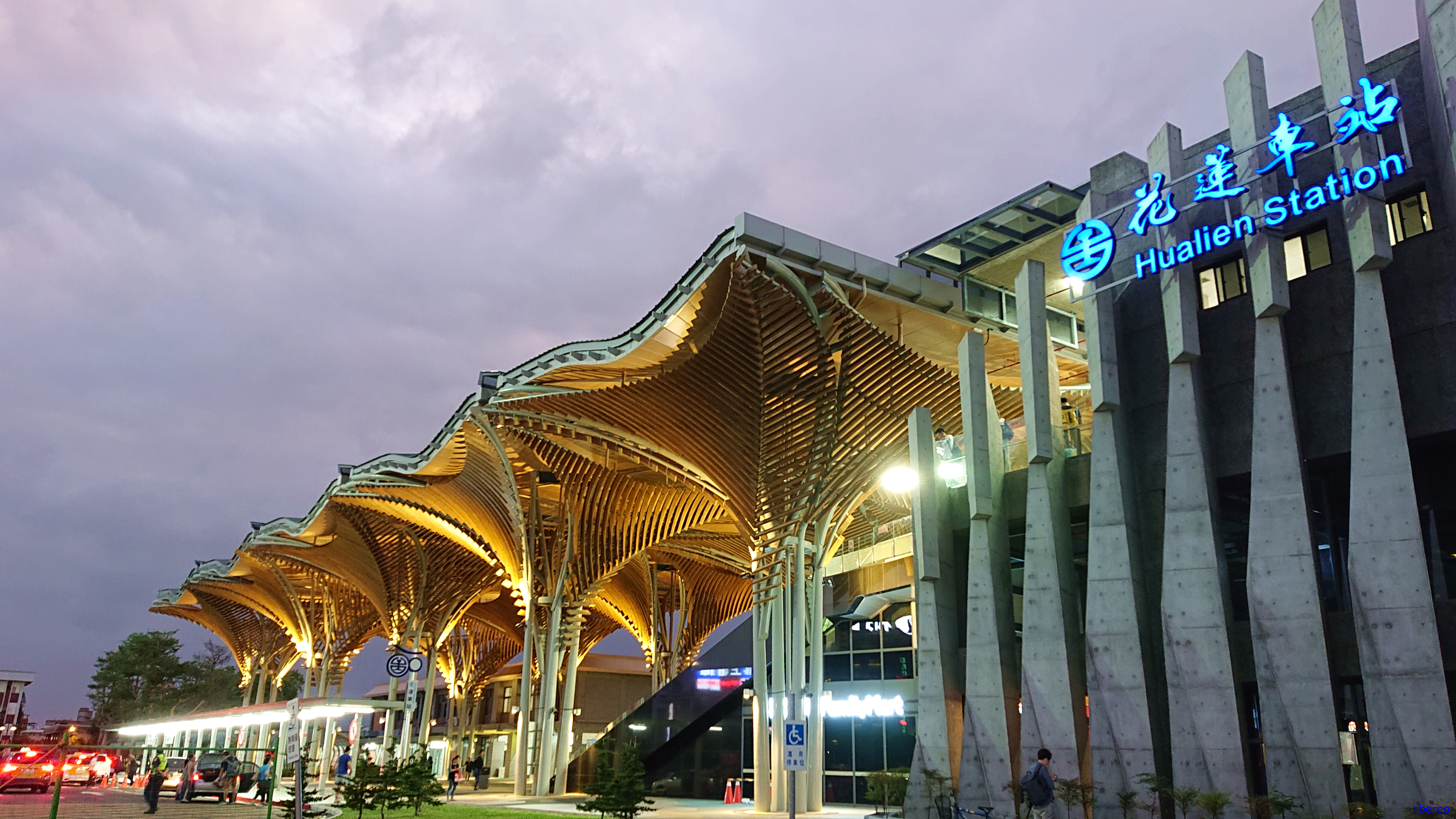

Chinese name
- Traditional Chinese: 花蓮
Transcriptions
Standard Mandarin
- Hanyu Pinyin: Huālián
- Bopomofo: ㄏㄨㄚ ㄌㄧㄢˊ
Hakka
- Romanization: Fá-lǐen (Sixian dialect); Fà-lien (Hailu dialect)
Southern Min
- Tâi-lô: Hua-lian

General information
- Other names: Kalingko (Amis)
- Location: 100 Guolian 1st Rd; Hualien City, Hualien County; Taiwan
- Coordinates: 23.9929°N 121.6011°E
- System: Taiwan Railway railway station
- Lines: Eastern Trunk line; Eastern Trunk line
- Distance: 169.4 km to Badu
- Connections: Local bus; Coach

Construction
- Structure type: Ground level

Other information
- Station code: I14 (statistical)
- Classification: Special class (Chinese: 特等)
- Website: www.railway.gov.tw/Hualien/index.aspx (in Chinese)

History
- Opened: 1910-12-16
- Rebuilt: 2018-10-03
- Electrified: 2014-06-28
- Former names: Karenkō (Japanese: 花蓮港); Hualien Port (Chinese: 花蓮港)

Key dates
- 1944-10-02: Destroyed in war
- 1949-06-24: Rebuilt
- 1979-02-07: Relocated

Passengers
- 2017: 10.559 million per year ▼0.4%
- Rank: 12 out of 228

Services
Preceding station	Taiwan Railway	Following station
Beipu towards Badu	Eastern Trunk line	Ji'an towards Taitung
Location
- Location within Taiwan

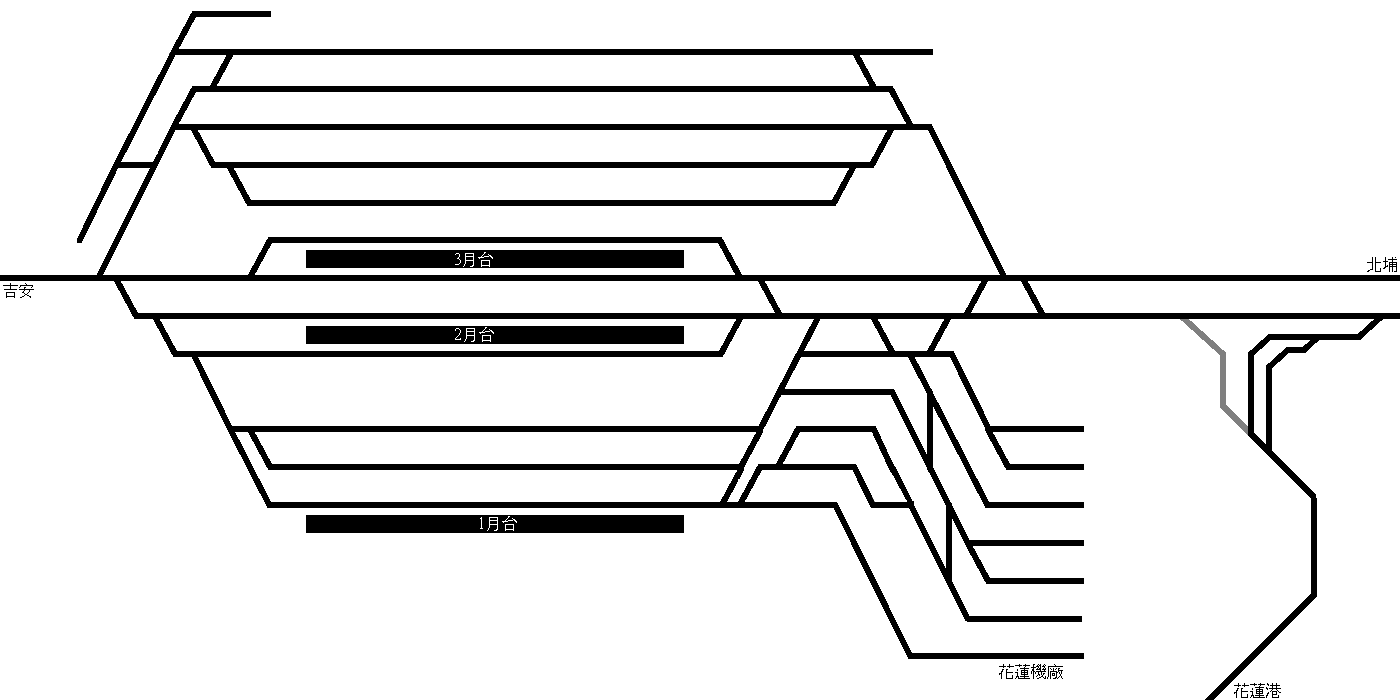
Hualien station track layout

Hualien (Chinese: 花蓮; pinyin: Huālián; Pe̍h-ōe-jī: Hoa-lian) is a railway station in Hualien City, Hualien County, Taiwan, served by the Taiwan Railway. It is the terminal station of the North-link line and the starting station of the Taitung line.

== Overview ==
The station has two island platforms and one side platform.

It first opened on 17 February 1911 as "Karenkō station" (花蓮港驛). It was rebuilt in 2018 with a modern design and more retail space for food, drink, and gift shops.

== Around the station ==
- Hualien Al-Falah Mosque
- Hualien County Council
- Hualien County Stone Sculptural Museum
- Hualien Martyrs' Shrine
- Hualien Stadium
- Port of Hualien
- Tzu Chi University

== See also ==
- List of railway stations in Taiwan

Next station:

- (towards Taitung Station) Ji'an Station
- (towards Taipei Station) Beipu Station
