= Port of Hualien =

Port in Hualien City, Hualien County, Taiwan

Port of Hualien 花蓮港
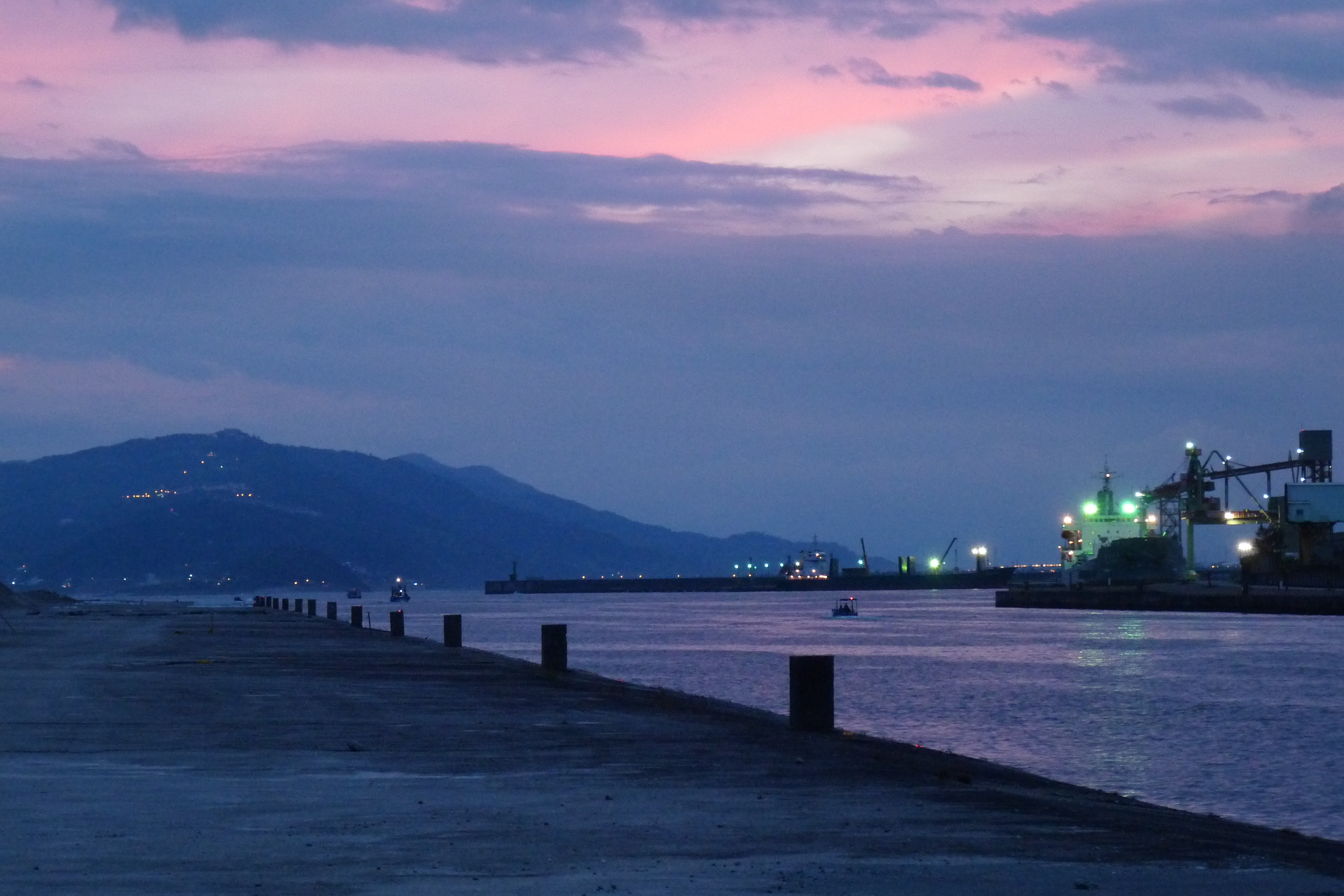
- Interactive map of Port of Hualien 花蓮港

Location
- Location: Hualien City, Hualien County, Taiwan
- Coordinates: 23°59′11″N 121°37′35″E
- UN/LOCODE: TWHUN

Details
- Opened: 1939
- Operated by: Taiwan International Ports Corporation
- No. of wharfs: 25

Statistics
- Annual container volume: 12,938,686 tons(2011)
- Website; Official website

The Port of Hualien (Chinese: 花蓮港; pinyin: Huālián Gǎng) is an international port on the Pacific Ocean in Hualien City, Hualien County, Taiwan. Its artificial harbor protected by breakwaters was built in 1930–1939. There are 25 wharves in Hualien Port. The annual container volume is about 13 million tons. The port mainly transports local gravel, cement, and marble, and is host to cruise ships and whale watching boats.

The port is operated by the Taiwan International Ports Corporation which is the state-owned harbor management company.

== History ==
The Port of Hualien was constructed from 1930 to 1939 (Japanese rule), for carrying local granulated sugar to Japan and transporting island-round cargo. The government declared it one of the four international harbors on 1 September 1963. The harbor facilities were improved in an expansion project in 1991.

== Sister ports ==
The Port of Hualien has the following Sister Port agreements:

- Brownsville, Texas
- Long Beach, California
- Ishigaki, Okinawa

== See also ==
- List of East Asian ports
- Transportation in Taiwan
