= Hualien County Government =

Government of Hualien County, Taiwan

Coordinates: 23.9913°N 121.6198°E

- 花蓮縣政府

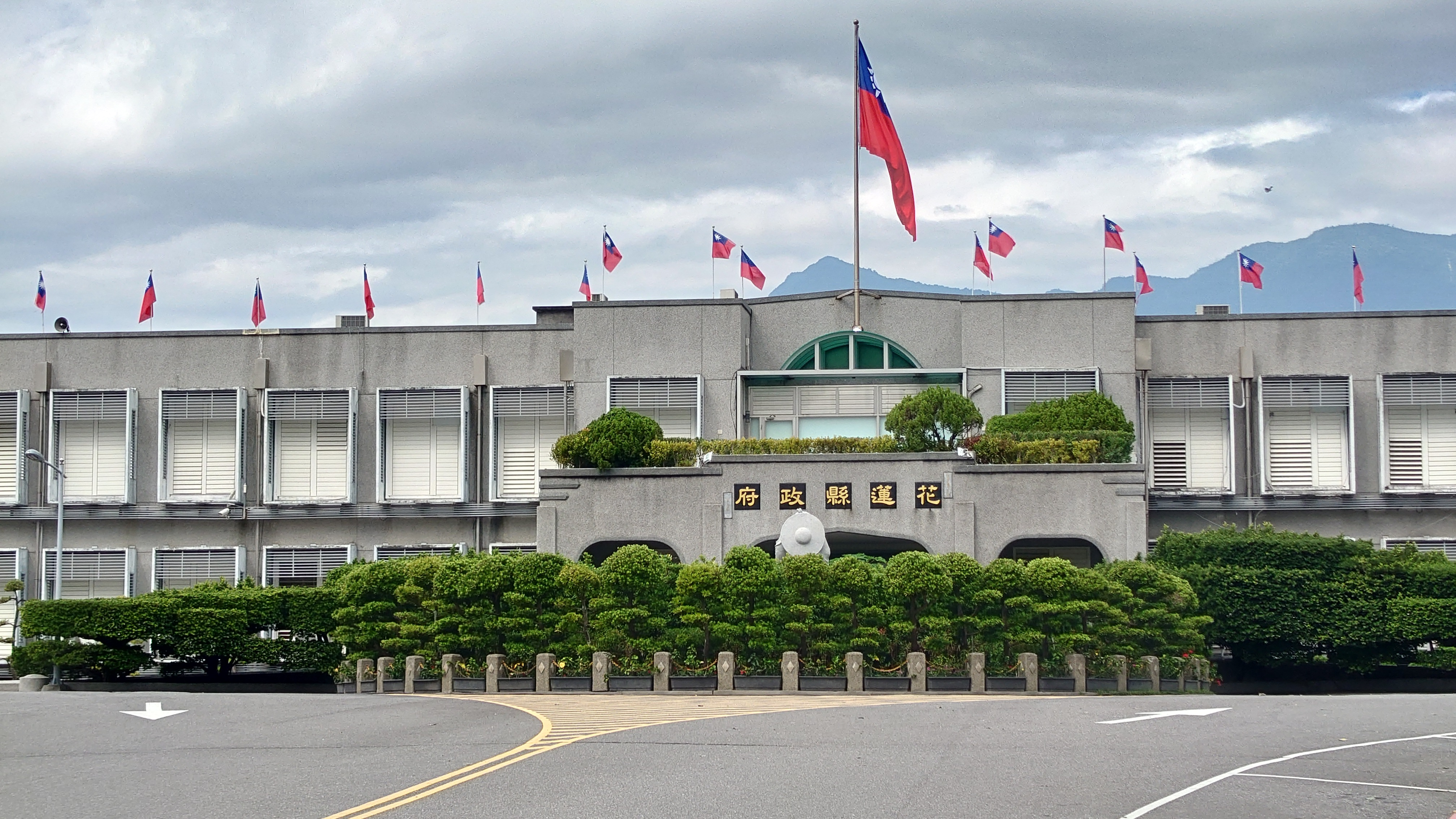

Agency overview
- Jurisdiction: Hualien County
- Headquarters: Hualien City
- Agency executive: Hsu Chen-wei, Magistrate
- Website: Official website

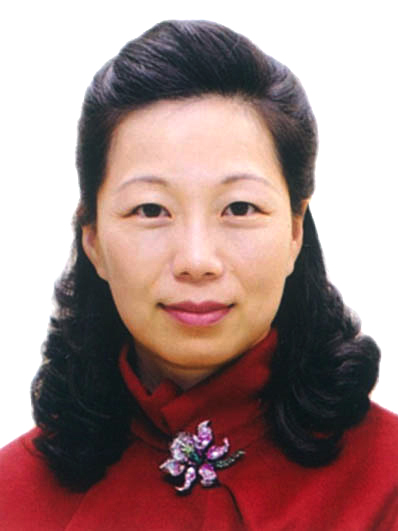
Hsu Chen-wei, the incumbent Magistrate of Hualien County

The Hualien County Government (Chinese: 花蓮縣政府; pinyin: Huālián Xiàn Zhèngfǔ) is the local government of Hualien County, Taiwan.

== Organizational structure ==
- Department of Civil Affairs
- Department of Finance
- Department of Public Works
- Department of Urban/Rural Development
- Agriculture Bureau

== See also ==
- Hualien County Council
