= Xincheng =

Xincheng may refer to:

== People ==
- Tuoba Xincheng (拓拔新成), brother of Emperor Wencheng of Northern Wei; held the title of Prince You of Yangping
- Xincheng, one of the daughters of Emperor Taizong of Tang (Li Shimin) and Empress Zhangsun

== Places ==
=== Mainland China ===
- Xincheng County (忻城县), in Laibin, Guangxi
- Xincheng District (新城区)
  - Xincheng District, Hohhot, Inner Mongolia
  - Xincheng District, Xi'an, Shaanxi
- Xincheng Air Base and Yinchuan/Xincheng Air Base, both in the Lanzhou Military Region of the PRC
- Xincheng, one of the nine commanderies of the Protectorate General to Pacify the East
- Xincheng Prison in Beijing
- Xincheng Town (disambiguation)
- Xincheng Township (disambiguation) (新城乡)
- Xincheng Subdistrict (disambiguation)

=== Taiwan ===
- Xincheng, Hualien (新城鄉), township in Hualien City, Republic of China (Taiwan)
  - Xincheng Incident, during the Japanese occupation

== Art forms ==
- Xincheng Opera, a traditional form of Chinese theater from northeast China

== See also ==
- Xingcheng, a county-level city in Huludao, Liaoning province, China
