= 1914 in Taiwan =

- Decades: 1890s; 1900s; 1910s; 1920s; 1930s
- See also: Other events of 1914; History of Taiwan • Timeline • Years

Events from the year 1914 in Taiwan, Empire of Japan.

== Incumbents ==
=== Monarchy ===
- Emperor: Taisho

=== Central government of Japan ===
- Prime Minister: Yamamoto Gonnohyōe (until 16 April), Ōkuma Shigenobu (from 16 April)

=== Taiwan ===
- Governor-General: Sakuma Samata

== Events ==
- 21 March – Nojima Ginzo piloted the double-propeller compound-blade aircraft "Falcon" at 10:37 and took off to an altitude of 100 meters and hovered for four minutes before landing. This day was designated by the Taiwan Governor-General's Office as Taiwan Airlines Memorial Day
- 17 May – The Truku War broke out.
- 28 August – The Truku War ends.
- 22 November — Itagaki Taisuke visited Taiwan.
- 20 December — The Taiwan Assimilation Association was established.

== Births ==
- 21 July – Pan Jin-yu, last remaining speaker of the Pazeh language (d. 2010).
- 20 August – Shoki Coe, Presbyterian minister (d.1988).
- 25 August – Lu Ho-jo, writer, vocalist, and playwright (d. 1950)
