= 1910 in Taiwan =

- Decades: 1890s; 1900s; 1910s; 1920s; 1930s
- See also: Other events of 1910; History of Taiwan • Timeline • Years

Events from the year 1910 in Taiwan, Empire of Japan.

== Incumbents ==
=== Monarchy ===
- Emperor: Meiji

=== Central government of Japan ===
- Prime Minister: Katsura Tarō

=== Taiwan ===
- Governor-General – Sakuma Samata

== Events ==
=== October ===
- 1 October – The opening of Lumachan railway station in Tainan Prefecture

=== December ===
- 16 December – The opening of Shoufeng railway station in Karenkō Prefecture

== Births ==
- 22 March – Thomas Liao, activist
