= Truku =

Truku may refer to:

- Truku people, Taiwanese indigenous people
- Truku language, language of Truku people

== See also ==
- Truku War
