= 1915 in Taiwan =

- Decades: 1890s; 1900s; 1910s; 1920s; 1930s
- See also: Other events of 1915; History of Taiwan • Timeline • Years

Events from the year 1915 in Taiwan, Empire of Japan.

== Incumbents ==
=== Monarchy ===
- Emperor: Taisho

=== Central government of Japan ===
- Prime Minister: Ōkuma Shigenobu

=== Taiwan ===
- Governor-General – Sakuma Samata, Andō Teibi

== Events ==
=== January ===
- 26 January – The opening of Ruisui Station in Karenkō Prefecture.

=== October ===
- 28 October – The opening of Kagi Shrine in Tainan Prefecture.

== Births ==
- 6 November – Chung Li-ho, novelist
