= 1919 in Taiwan =

- Decades: 1890s; 1900s; 1910s; 1920s; 1930s
- See also: Other events of 1919; History of Taiwan • Timeline • Years

Events from the year 1919 in Taiwan, Empire of Japan.

== Incumbents ==
=== Monarchy ===
- Emperor: Taisho

=== Central government of Japan ===
- Prime Minister: Hara Takashi

=== Taiwan ===
- Governor-General – Akashi Motojiro (until 26 October), Den Kenjirō (from 29 October)

== Events ==
- 20 August – The Taiwan Army of Japan was established.

== Births ==
- 9 August – Tsai Cao-ju, painter.
- 23 September – Hsu Shih, composer.
- 8 October – Teruo Nakamura, soldier, last Japanese holdout.
