= 1917 in Taiwan =

- Decades: 1890s; 1900s; 1910s; 1920s; 1930s
- See also: Other events of 1917; History of Taiwan • Timeline • Years

Events from the year 1917 in Taiwan, Empire of Japan.

== Incumbents ==
=== Monarchy ===
- Emperor: Taisho

=== Central government of Japan ===
- Prime Minister: Terauchi Masatake

=== Taiwan ===
- Governor-General: Andō Teibi

== Events ==
- 5 January – The deadliest part of the 1916–1917 Nantou earthquakes occurred, registering at 6.2 on the Richter scale with a shallow hypocentre, killing 54 people.
- 12 February – Reverend William Campbell returns to China.
- 24 July – Construction of the Yilan line began.
- 22 October – Prince Naruhisa Kitashirakawa and his wife Fusako visited Taiwan.
- 29 December — The Waseda University baseball team came to Taiwan.

== Births ==
- 6 January – Koo Chen-fu, businessman, diplomat, and film producer.
- 18 January – Wang Yung-ching, businessman.
- 10 February – Chen Ta-ju, lyricist.
