= 1913 in Taiwan =

- Decades: 1890s; 1900s; 1910s; 1920s; 1930s
- See also: Other events of 1913; History of Taiwan • Timeline • Years

Events from the year 1913 in Taiwan, Empire of Japan.

== Incumbents ==
=== Monarchy ===
- Emperor: Taisho

=== Central government of Japan ===
- Prime Minister: Katsura Tarō (until 20 February), Yamamoto Gonnohyōe (from 20 February)

=== Taiwan ===
- Governor-General: Sakuma Samata

== Events ==
- 25 January – Regular shipping routes between Keelung and Hualien Ports were opened; the Governor-General announced the "Taiwan Gunpowder Ban Rules", which came into effect on 1 February.
- 10 February – The Governor-General announced the "Taiwan Industrial Combination Rules" and the "Taiwan Industrial Combination Rules Implementation Rules", which came into effect on 1 March.
- 19 March – The renovation project of Wufeng Temple was completed, and Governor Sakuma Mata personally presided over the ceremony. (the monument was built on 24 October 1914.)
- 21 March – About a hundred people of the Hehuan Mountain expedition and mountaineering team died due to snow and ice and were missing.
- 23 March – A fire broke out at the Taipei Post Office, and all the office buildings were burned down.
- 25 March – The Taiwan Medical Doctors Conference was held at Taipei Railway Hotel.
- 31 March – According to the "Taiwan-wide Street Tree Planting Plan", the Governor-General of Taiwan listed street trees as acacia, eucalyptus, camphor, terminalia, sycamore, maple, cherry, poinciana, kohlrabi, and abo. Le et al., green tunnels have become a unique landscape of Taiwan's highways.

== Births ==
- 3 September – Henry Kao, politician, Mayor of Taipei (1954–1957, 1964–1972) and Ministry of Transportation and Communications (1927–1976).
