= 1923 in Taiwan =

- Decades: 1900s; 1910s; 1920s; 1930s; 1940s
- See also: Other events of 1923; History of Taiwan • Timeline • Years

Events from the year 1923 in Taiwan, Empire of Japan.

== Incumbents ==
=== Monarchy ===
- Emperor: Taisho

=== Central government of Japan ===
- Prime Minister: Katō Tomosaburō, Yamamoto Gonnohyōe

=== Taiwan ===
- Governor-General – Den Kenjirō, Uchida Kakichi

== Births ==
- 15 January – Lee Teng-hui, President of the Republic of China (1988–2000)
- 2 December – Shih Chun-jen, Minister of the Department of Health (1986–1990)
