= 1912 in Taiwan =

- Decades: 1890s; 1900s; 1910s; 1920s; 1930s
- See also: Other events of 1912; History of Taiwan • Timeline • Years

Events from the year 1912 in Taiwan, Empire of Japan.

== Incumbents ==
=== Monarchy ===
- Emperor: Meiji (until 30 July), Taisho (from 30 July)

=== Central government of Japan ===
- Prime Minister: Saionji Kinmochi (until 21 December), Katsura Tarō (from 21 December)

=== Taiwan ===
- Governor-General: Sakuma Samata

== Births ==
- 1 February – Hsin Wen-bing, politician, Mayor of Taipei (1960–1964) and member of the Legislative Yuan (1973–1981).
- 7 May – Hung Jui-lin, artist
