= 1918 in Taiwan =

- Decades: 1890s; 1900s; 1910s; 1920s; 1930s
- See also: Other events of 1918; History of Taiwan • Timeline • Years

Events from the year 1918 in Taiwan, Empire of Japan.

== Incumbents ==
=== Monarchy ===
- Emperor: Taisho

=== Central government of Japan ===
- Prime Minister: Terauchi Masatake, Hara Takashi

=== Taiwan ===
- Governor-General – Andō Teibi, Akashi Motojiro

== Events ==
- 6 June: Akashi Motojiro was promoted to general and appointed by Prime Minister Terauchi as the Governor-General of Taiwan.

== Births ==
- Su Beng, historian
