= 1916 in Taiwan =

- Decades: 1890s; 1900s; 1910s; 1920s; 1930s
- See also: Other events of 1916; History of Taiwan • Timeline • Years

Events from the year 1916 in Taiwan, Empire of Japan.

== Incumbents ==
=== Monarchy ===
- Emperor: Taisho

=== Central government of Japan ===
- Prime Minister: Ōkuma Shigenobu, Terauchi Masatake

=== Taiwan ===
- Governor-General – Andō Teibi

== Events ==
=== August ===
- 28 August – The largest in the Nantou earthquake sequence occurred

== Births ==
- 23 April – Wang King-ho, physician
