= 1920 in Taiwan =

- Decades: 1900s; 1910s; 1920s; 1930s; 1940s
- See also: Other events of 1920; History of Taiwan • Timeline • Years

Events from the year 1920 in Taiwan, Empire of Japan.

== Incumbents ==
=== Monarchy ===
- Emperor: Taisho

=== Central government of Japan ===
- Prime Minister: Hara Takashi

=== Taiwan ===
- Governor-General – Den Kenjirō

== Events ==
=== January ===
11 January – Founding of the New People Society.

== Births ==
- 7 March – Bo Yang, Taiwanese writer
- 29 March – Hung Tung, Taiwanese painter
- 23 July – Chen Tuan-tang, Taiwanese politician, Mayor of Taichung (1973–1977)
- 19 September – Lin Tsung-yi, Taiwanese psychiatrist
- 27 October – Ts'ao Yung-ho, Taiwanese historian
