= 1906 in Taiwan =

- Decades: 1880s; 1890s; 1900s; 1910s; 1920s
- See also: Other events of 1906; History of Taiwan • Timeline • Years

Events from the year 1906 in Taiwan, Empire of Japan.

== Incumbents ==
=== Monarchy ===
- Emperor: Meiji

=== Central government of Japan ===
- Prime Minister: Katsura Tarō, Saionji Kinmochi

=== Taiwan ===
- Governor-General: Kodama Gentarō, Sakuma Samata

== Events ==
=== March ===
- 17 March – The 6.8 M_{s} Meishan earthquake affected the southwestern portion of the island with a maximum Mercalli intensity of IX (Violent), causing at least 1,258 deaths and several thousand injuries.

== Births ==
- 21 July – Teng Yu-hsien, former musician.
