= 1907 in Taiwan =

- Decades: 1880s; 1890s; 1900s; 1910s; 1920s
- See also: Other events of 1907; History of Taiwan • Timeline • Years

Events from the year 1907 in Taiwan, Empire of Japan.

== Incumbents ==
=== Monarchy ===
- Emperor: Meiji

=== Central government of Japan ===
- Prime Minister: Saionji Kinmochi

=== Taiwan ===
- Governor-General: Sakuma Samata

== Film production in 1907 ==
In 1907, under Japanese rule in Taiwan, the first film ever made in Taiwan, was named "An Introduction to the Actual Condition of Taiwan", was produced. This film was a propaganda piece commissioned by the Japanese authorities to showcase Taiwan's progress and features the repression of a Taiwanese indigenous revolt. The film, which is now lost, also portrayed scenic locations and exotic goods like bananas and coconuts.

== Births ==
- 5 June – Lee Tze-fan, painter.
