= Uchida Kakichi =

Governor-General Of Taiwan

Senior Third Rank Uchida Kakichi
- 内田 嘉吉
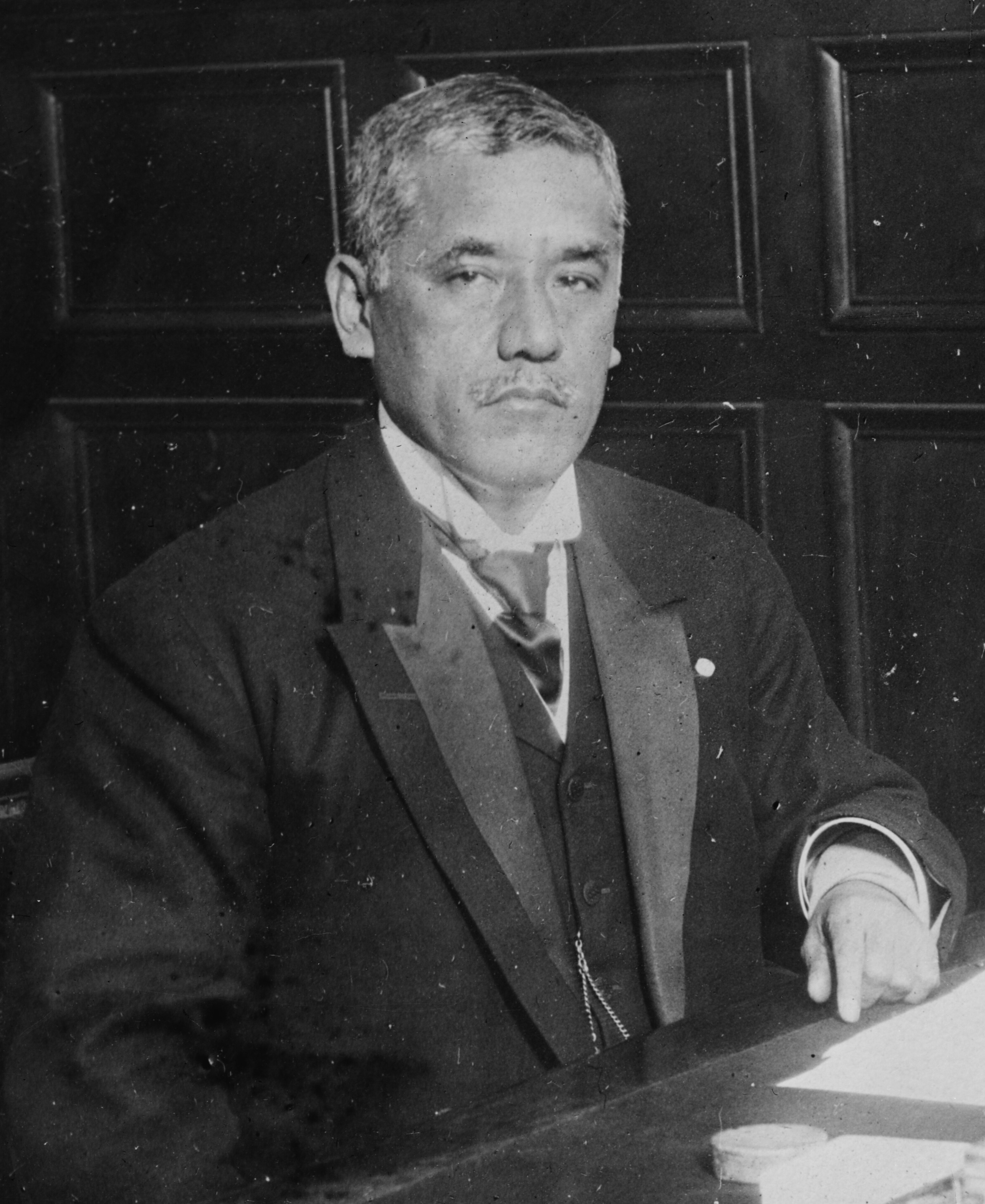
- Kakichi c. 1920

9th Governor-General of Taiwan
- In office 6 September 1923 – 1 September 1924
- Monarch: Taishō
- Preceded by: Den Kenjirō
- Succeeded by: Takio Izawa

Chief of General Affairs, Government-General of Taiwan
- In office 22 August 1910 – 20 October 1915
- Governors General: Sakuma Samata; Andō Teibi
- Preceded by: Ōshima Kumaji; Shunji Miyao (acting)
- Succeeded by: Hiroshi Shimomura

Member of the House of Peers
- In office 21 September 1918 – 3 January 1933 Nominated by the Emperor

Personal details
- Born: 18 November 1866 Edo, Musashi, Japan
- Died: 3 January 1933 (aged 66) Ōmori, Tokyo, Japan
- Party: Rikken Seiyūkai
- Education: Tokyo Imperial University

Uchida Kakichi (内田 嘉吉; 18 November 1866 – 3 January 1933) was the 9th Governor-General of Taiwan from 6 September 1923 to September 1924. Prior to assuming the office of Governor-General, Uchida also served as Chief of Home Affairs under Governors-General Sakuma Samata and Ando Sadami, the second highest position in the colonial government.

== Early life ==
Uchida Kakichi was born in 1866 and graduated from Tokyo Imperial University. Following his education, he began his civil service career in the Japanese Ministry of Telecommunications.

== Colonial service in Taiwan ==
Uchida served as the chief of civil affairs (director of civilian administration) for the Taiwan Government-General from 22 August 1910 to 19 October 1915, during the governorships of Sakuma Samata and Andō Teibi.

== See also ==
- Taiwan under Japanese rule
