= 1922 in Taiwan =

- Decades: 1900s; 1910s; 1920s; 1930s; 1940s
- See also: Other events of 1922; History of Taiwan • Timeline • Years

Events from the year 1922 in Taiwan, Empire of Japan.

== Incumbents ==
=== Monarchy ===
- Emperor: Taisho

=== Central government of Japan ===
- Prime Minister: Takahashi Korekiyo, Katō Tomosaburō

=== Taiwan ===
- Governor-General – Den Kenjirō

== Events ==
=== April ===
- 1 April – The opening of Shinchiku Prefectural Shinchiku High School in Shinchiku Prefecture.

=== September ===
- 13 September – The opening of Mudan Station in Taihoku Prefecture.

=== October ===
- 11 October – The opening of Baishatun Station in Shinchiku Prefecture.

== Births ==
- 16 February – Wang Ching-rui, shooter
