= Hong (Chinese surname) =

Hong is the pinyin romanization of the Chinese surname 洪 (Hóng). It was listed 184th among the Song-era Hundred Family Surnames. Today it is not among the 100 most common surnames in mainland China but it was the 15th-most-common surname in Taiwan in 2005. As counted by a Chinese census, Taiwan is the area with the largest number of people with the name. It is also the pinyin romanization of a number of less-common names including Hóng (弘), Hóng (t 閎, s 闳), and Hóng (宏). All of those names are romanized as Hung in Wade-Giles.

"Hong" is also one spelling employed for the Cantonese pronunciation of the surname Xiong (熊).

The Hokkien and Teochew romanization of Hong (that uses the character 洪) is Ang, which is also used for Wang (汪, Wāng).

It is also the romanization used for the Korean surname Hong, which uses the character 洪 in hanja, the Khmer surname ហុង (Hong), as well as the surname Hồng in Vietnam, from the Sino-Vietnamese reading of Chinese character 洪.

== Origin ==
The name 洪 literally means "flood".

The legendary origin of the family links it to descendants of the Yan Emperor who originally bore the ancestral name (xing) Jiang (姜) and the clan name "Gonggong" (共工). The Gonggongs directed irrigation works and managed flood control on the west bank of the Yellow River in the southeast corner of the Ordos Loop above the Wei.

After the Yellow Emperor conquered the Yan Emperor's territory, his relatives and descendants were persecuted and the Gonggong rebelled during the reign of the Gaoyang Emperor. The future Ku Emperor led an army against the rebellion and crushed them at the Battle of Bei Zhou Shan. Supposedly, among his soldiers were the descendants of Suiren, credited with the invention of fire, so that this is referred to in Chinese sources as a battle between fire and water. The Gonggong were reinstated in their former position only to provoke widespread flooding under the Yao Emperor when they opposed some of his orders. A second army brought a second defeat and the Yao Emperor banished the Gonggong to Jiangnan.

When the Chinese ceased to have both ancestral and clan names, many Gonggongs combined the water radical from jiang with the character gong to produce Hong.

== Ancestral centers ==
Dunhuang in Gansu and Nanchang in Jiangxi.

== List of persons with the surname ==
=== Hong ===
- Apple Hong (born 1978), Malaysian-born Singaporean actress
- Hong Chengchou (1593–1665), Chinese official
- Hong Liangji (1746–1809), Chinese scholar, statesman, political theorist, and philosopher
- Hong Ling (actress) (born 1994), Singaporean actress
- Hong Peiyun (born 2001), Chinese singer
- Hong Rengan (1822–1864), Chinese revolutionary
- Hong Xiuquan (1814–1864), Chinese revolutionary and religious leader
- Hong Yuanshuo (1948–2015), Chinese football manager
- James Hong (born 1929), American actor and voice actor.
- Jess Hong, New Zealand actress
- Jian Fang Lay (born Hóng Jiànfāng, 1973), Australian table tennis player
- Tara Hong, Cambodian-born American politician

=== Horng ===
- Ray-Hua Horng (洪瑞華), Taiwanese electrical engineer

=== Hung ===
- Amy Hung (born 1980), Taiwanese golfer
- Bruce Hung (born 1990), Taiwanese actor
- Chris Hung (born 1963), Taiwanese singer and television host
- Hung Cee Kay (born 1972), Hong Kong swimmer
- Hung Chi-chang (born 1951), Taiwanese politician
- Hung Chung Yam (born 1967), Hong Kong former cyclist
- Hung Hei-gun (1745–1825), Chinese martial artist
- Hung Hsiu-chu (born 1948), Taiwanese politician
- Hung Huang (born 1961), American-Chinese media figure
- Hung I-Hsiang (1925–1993), Taiwanese martial artist
- Hung Jui-chen (born 1990), Taiwanese tennis player
- Hung Meng-chi (born 1947), Taiwanese politician
- Hung Shih-han (born 1990), Taiwanese badminton player
- Hung Shing, Chinese folk religion deity
- Hung Tung (1920–1987), Taiwanese painter
- Hung Tzu-yung (born 1982), Taiwanese politician
- John Hung (born 1938), Hong Kong businessman
- Ken Hung (born 1987), Hong Kong singer
- Kenneth Tin-Kin Hung (born 1976), Chinese-American new media artist
- Kit Hung (born 1977), Hong Kong filmmaker
- Mien-Chie Hung (born 1950), American molecular biologist and cancer researcher
- Osman Hung (born 1979), Hong Kong singer-songwriter and actor
- Sammo Hung (born 1952), Chinese actor, martial artist and film director
- Shih-Ting Hung (born 1980), Taiwanese film director
- Stephen Hung (born 1959), Hong Kong businessman
- Timmy Hung (born 1974), Hong Kong actor
- Tony Hung (born 1983), Hong Kong actor and television host
- William Hung (sinologist) (1893–1980), Chinese historian and sinologist

=== Ang ===
- Jeremy Ang Jones (born ?), British Singaporean Actor
- Ang Hin Kee (born 1965), Singaporean former politician
- Ang Kiukok (1931–2005), Filipino painter
- Ang Mong Seng (born 1949), Malaysia-born Singaporean former politician
- Ang Wei Neng (born 1967), Singaporean politician and businessman
- Belinda Ang (born 1954), Singaporean judge
- Eric Ang (born 1971), Filipino sport shooter
- Joshua Ang (born 1989), Singaporean actor
- Sunny Ang (1939–1967), Singaporean murderer
- Ang Swee Chai, British Singaporean doctor, co-founder of Medical Aid for Palestinians
- Teresita Ang See (born 1949), Filipino civic leader
