= Hsu Shih =

Taiwanese male composer

Hsu Shih 許石
- Born: September 23, 1919; Tainan, Japanese Taiwan
- Died: August 2, 1980 (aged 60) Taoyuan
- Genres: Folk music, Taiwanese ballads
- Occupation: Composer
- Instruments: Piano, Daguangxian, long-necked Yueqin
- Labels: China Records, Queen Records, Da Wang Records, Tai Wang Records

Hsu Shih (Chinese: 許石; Pe̍h-ōe-jī: Khóo Tsio̍h; September 23, 1919 – August 2, 1980) was a post-World War II Taiwanese composer who created many Taiwanese ballads, including "Anping Memories," "The Sound of the Gongs (Chinese: 鑼聲若響)," and "Southern Nocturne" as his masterpieces. In 1946, Hsu Shih returned to Taiwan from Japan and gradually collected and organized Taiwanese folk songs scattered in various places and promoted local music. He used orchestral music to raise the status of Taiwanese folk songs and organized choral tours with Taiwanese characteristics, pioneering the trend of popular music.

== Life and career ==
Hsu was born on September 23, 1919, and was the youngest of eleven children in his family. He attended Taiwanese opera performances and parades organized by temples as a child, and worked odd jobs with his siblings until saving enough money to pursue secondary and musical education in Japan.

In 1936, Hsu went to Tokyo by ship to study at the Japanese Academy of Music, where he learned from the Japanese composers Akizuki (Japanese: 秋月), Oomura Nousyou (Japanese: 大村能章), and Yasuaki Yoshida (Japanese: 吉田恭章), and studied theoretical composition, vocal music, and performance songs, while Wu Jin-huai was a senior from the same school. During his studies, he delivered milk and newspapers and went to Hokkaido to work during the summer and winter while receiving music training from the Japanese Academy of Music. To match the pace of his Japanese classmates, Hsu Shih would embark on early morning jogs to enhance his physical stamina and refine his vocal abilities. When it came to piano practice, he would dedicate himself to the instrument until his fingers grew stiff. However, due to financial constraints, he would resort to practicing on paper, as he had to save up approximately one month's salary to afford a mere hour of playing time. After completing his studies, Hsu Shih worked as an exclusive singer for the Tokyo Red Windmill Theater and the Tobin Troupe in Japan until 1946, when he returned to Taiwan from Japan because his mother was critically ill. While attending an international student gathering in Japan, Hsu and other Taiwanese were asked to perform Taiwanese folk songs. The Taiwanese students could not think of any songs, shocking the international group and inspiring Hsu's later work in folk song collection and rearrangement.

In 1946, Hsu Shih released "Southern Nocturne" on his first tour around Taiwan, which became famous throughout Taiwan. In 1947, he took Wen Hsia, a high school student, to Hengchun to collect local songs and record traditional folk songs such as "Thought Up (Chinese: 思想起)" sung by Chen Da. Periodically, Hsu Shih would meticulously rearrange the folk songs he had collected, enlisting the participation of esteemed literary figures and renowned lyricists, including Hsu Ping-ting and Chen Ta-ju, to enrich the repertoire of Taiwanese folk songs. In addition, to actively promote and share Taiwanese vernacular folk music, Hsu Shih has also held more than ten Taiwanese vernacular music concerts.

In 1952, Hsu Shih founded China Records (Chinese: 中國唱片公司), which was later rebranded as Queen Records (Chinese: 女王唱片), Da Wang Records (Chinese: 大王唱片), and Tai Wang Records (Chinese: 太王唱片公司). These record companies were established to promote Taiwanese folk songs and ballads. However, during that period, the prevailing lack of copyright awareness and widespread piracy posed significant challenges to the survival of record companies, placing a considerable financial burden on Hsu Shih in the long run. Hsu Shih set up a production studio at 90 Hebian North Street in Sanchong City (now Sanchong District, New Taipei City) and published his works, including "Anping Memories," "A Rainy Night at the Port," "Love's Lone Flower (Chinese: 孤戀花)," and "Midnight Road Lamp (Chinese: 夜半路燈)." These songs gained popularity as a result of Hsu Shih's extensive touring and concert performances, eventually leading to their official recordings. For example, in 1952, Da Wang Records held the "Taiwan Folk Ballad Concert" and released songs such as "June Jasmine (Chinese: 六月茉莉)," "Cow Plough Song (Chinese: 牛犁歌)," "Haunting the Fifth Night (Chinese: 鬧五更)," "Divination Tune (Chinese: 卜卦調)," "Clinking Coins," "Teochew Tune (Chinese: 潮州調)," and "Thought Up," which were then released through Da Wang Records.

On August 2, 1980, he died of heart disease at 60 at Linkou Chang Gung Memorial Hospital in Taoyuan County.

== Collecting folk songs and arranging music ==
Hsu Shih went to Japan to study composition and singing at the Japanese Academy of Music, and his Japanese teacher said, "You should put Taiwan's culture into your songs. After he returned to Taiwan, he actively collected, promoted, and composed local folk songs in Taiwan, such as "Anping Memories" and "The Sound of the Gongs". Hsu Shih rearranged most of the collected folk songs, invited suitable singers to perform them, and made them into records. The range of folk songs collected includes Taiwanese folk music from the Japanese era, Yilan folk music, peasant folk music, northern folk music, Duma folk music, Che drum folk music, Hengchun folk music, Hakka folk music, mountain folk music, Fangliao folk music, and Yue Dan folk music. The songs "Anping Memories" and "The Sound of the Gongs" are considered to be representative of Hsu Shih's use of music to deepen Taiwan's history.

Chen Chih-Wei, adjunct assistant professor at the Institute of Musicology, National Taiwan University, said: "After he returned to Taiwan, Hsu Shih began to visit the whole island to record the songs of the various ethnic groups in the land, including the fúlǎo, Hakka, and aborigines. This was nearly twenty years before the folk song-collecting campaign initiated by Hsu Tsang-Houei and Shih Wei-Liang. In 1964, when Hsu Tsang-Houei and Shih Wei-Liang were about to start their research on folk music in Taiwan, Shih held a concert at the Taipei International House on October 10 of the same year and released his work Taiwan Folk Symphony (Chinese: 台灣鄉土交響曲), which was the culmination of his years of work in folk music. The whole piece is a combination of Chinese and foreign instruments, and he also used the unique Taiwanese Daguangxian and long-necked Yueqin.”

Professor Lu Hsing-chang (Chinese: 呂興昌), of the Department of Taiwanese Literature at National Cheng Kung University said: "Hsu Shih has made great contributions to Taiwanese music, and at that time it was popular to cover Japanese or foreign songs directly, or else to create Mandarin songs, but both Hsu Shih and his in-laws, musician Yang San-lang, always insisted on local creation in Taiwan." "Hsu Shih was the most typical and earliest composer to trace his roots," Lu pointed out. "He not only recorded and collected scores but also invited theater artist Lui Chu-shang (Chinese: 呂訴上) and literary scholar Hsu Ping-ting to write lyrics and make recordings to revive Taiwanese folk songs!” Today, the songs such as "Grass Borer and Chicken (Chinese: 草螟弄雞公)," "Thought Up," "Cow Plough Song" and "Divination Tune" are all based on the versions that Hsu Shih released in the Da Wang Records era. In addition, Hsu Shih also compiled the local folk songs he collected into the Taiwan Folk Symphony, the original score of which was found among Hsu Shih's belongings. Still, it has yet to be restored due to severe damage.

== Published songs ==
Hsu Shih listed 61 compositions in the first volume of his 10th, 20th, and 30th-anniversary releases and composition collections in 1959, 1969, and 1979, and nearly 40 unpublished loose manuscripts.

"Anping Memories" was composed by Hsu Shih and written by Chen Ta-ju in 1950, establishing their status in the Taiwanese songwriting industry. The music of Hsu Shih and Yang San-lang, as recalled by Chi Lu-hsia, who was appointed by Yang San-lang as the vocalist for many of his works, is as graphic as a movie in every section of music and lyrics. She cited Hsu Shih's "Anping Memories" as an example: "In the past, composers and lyricists were not like today, where three melodies are paired with different lyrics, and the music and lyrics are paired with each other, just like watching a film through the eardrums. She said that soon after Hsu Shih released the song "Anping Memories," the film industry adapted it into a movie starring Yang Li-hua. She also remembers that when she was recording for "The Sound of the Gongs" on Da Wang Records, it was recorded in the theater.

The original title of "Southern Nocturne," a song about love between a man and a woman, was originally titled "New Taiwan Construction Song (Chinese: 新臺灣建設歌)," with lyrics written by Xue Guanghua (Chinese: 薛光華), although it was customary at the time for lyrics to be written after discussion between the composer and the lyricist. In the songs, the lines "Seeing the rice pearls and cinnamon nowadays / Life is hard to find (Chinese: 見如今米珠薪桂／生活竟難求)" imply the musician's mild criticism of the rising prices of goods after the Kuomintang's retreat to Taiwan. Tsai Tien-chin (Chinese: 蔡添進), a lecturer at the Center for General Education at the Cheng Shiu University, explored the origin of the song and melody of "Southern Nocturne" and mentioned, "In the most popular movie in Taiwan, Cape No. 7, in 2008, when Mao Bo first joined the orchestra, he sang the lyrics of 'Southern Nocturne', 'I love my sister'. Composed by Hsu Shih and written by Cheng Chi-feng (Chinese: 鄭志峰), the song has been called “the first and most popular song in Taiwan after the Retrocession”. This song is sometimes called Taiwan Minor (Chinese: 台灣小調). It has been sung with various lyrics in different eras and regions, and its melody is thought to come from Japanese songs.”

== Legacy ==
On May 29, 2015, the Taipei Symphony Orchestra held its first-ever Taiwanese Hokkien concert to recall the appearance of Hsu Shih and Yang San-lang singing together, and invited Chi Lu-hsia, Liu Fu-chu, Lin Hsiu-chu (Chinese: 林秀珠), and Lee Ching-mei to perform in a retrospective of classic Taiwanese Hokkien songs from the 1950s. Liu Fu-chu, who learned to sing with Hsu Shih when he was 10 years old, thought of his mentor's death 35 years ago and lamented, "It should have been held a long time ago.”

In August 2015, the Liberty Times reported that the Chinese Wikipedia article about Hsu Shih was at risk of deletion. Hsu's son Charles had written a biography of his father, and the younger Hsu's contributions to the Chinese Wikipedia article resulted in the article receiving a "promotional" tag.
