= 1905 in Taiwan =

- Decades: 1880s; 1890s; 1900s; 1910s; 1920s
- See also: Other events of 1905; History of Taiwan • Timeline • Years

Events from the year 1905 in Taiwan, Empire of Japan.

== Incumbents ==
=== Monarchy ===
- Emperor: Meiji

=== Central government of Japan ===
- Prime Minister: Katsura Tarō

=== Taiwan ===
- Governor-General – Kodama Gentarō

== Events ==
=== March ===
- 26 March
  - The opening of Changhua Station in Taichū Prefecture.
  - The opening of Huatan Station in Taichū Prefecture.

=== May ===
- 15 May
  - The opening of Chenggong Station in Taichū Prefecture.
  - The opening of Taichung TRA station in Taichū Prefecture.
