= 1921 in Taiwan =

- Decades: 1900s; 1910s; 1920s; 1930s; 1940s
- See also: Other events of 1921; History of Taiwan • Timeline • Years

Events from the year 1921 in Taiwan, Empire of Japan.

== Incumbents ==
=== Monarchy ===
- Emperor: Taisho

=== Central government of Japan ===
- Prime Minister: Hara Takashi, Takahashi Korekiyo

=== Taiwan ===
- Governor-General – Den Kenjirō

== Events ==
=== October ===
- 17 October – The founding of Taiwanese Cultural Association.
