= Tanimbar Chinese =

Ethnic group in Indonesia

- Lunar Chinese New Year of Tanimbar Chinese Family Gathering (Feb 2026)

Regions with significant populations
- Saumlaki

Languages
- Indonesian, Ambonese

Religion
- Christianity, Buddhism, Islam

The Tanimbar Chinese are a community of Chinese Indonesians living in the Tanimbar Islands. The majority of Tanimbar Chinese were of Hokkien ancestry.

The history of the entry of Tanimbar Chinese into Indonesia in general cannot be ascertained well as with their arrival in the Maluku Islands, even if there are sources that prove the arrival of ethnic Chinese, mostly from stories from the local community and also from some evidence of inheritance from Chinese descendants who are still there and have even intermarried with native Maluku people.

== Family name ==
- Tan and Oei referring to the Afaratu
- Tan referring to the Tan, Tanlain, Tanago, Tandany, Tanjung
- Gan referring to the Ganwarin
- Go referring to the Go, Gosal, Gosan
- Oa#Ha referring to the Hamenda
- Lie referring to the Lerebulan
- Mi referring to the Miru
- Ang referring to the Anggito, Anggrek
- Wu referring to the Wulky

== Bibliography ==
- Johan Pattiasina (2020). "Etnis Tionghoa Dalam Dinamika Masyarakat Kepulauan Kei". Jurnal Lani:Kajian Ilmu Sejarah & Budaya. 1 (1 Hal 1-10). Universitas Pattimura - Program Studi Pendidikan Sejarah. ISSN 2746-8054.
