= List of Japanese governors-general of Korea =

The Governor-General of Chōsen was the chief administrator of the Japanese colonial government in Korea from 1910 to 1945. All of the governors-general were affiliated with the Japanese military. Terauchi Masatake was the first governor-general. Prior to becoming governor-general, he was the third and the last resident-general. Upon the annexation of Korea to Japanese Empire, he became the governor-general.

There were ten governors-general, while eight individuals served in this position. Saitō Makoto and Ugaki Kazushige both served two nonconsecutive terms as governor-general. Saitō was the third and the sixth governor-general, and Ugaki was the fourth and seventh governor-general. Thus, Minami Jirō, Koiso Kuniaki, and Abe Nobuyuki were respectively the eight, ninth, and tenth governors-general, but they were respectively the sixth, seventh, and eight individuals to serve as governors-general.

== Governors-General of Chōsen ==
No.	Portrait	Name		Took office	Left office	Monarch
No.	Portrait	Rōmaji	Kanji	Took office	Left office	Monarch
1		Terauchi Masatake	寺内 正毅	1 October 1910	9 October 1916	Meiji
1		Terauchi Masatake	寺内 正毅	1 October 1910	9 October 1916	Taishō
2		Hasegawa Yoshimichi	長谷川 好道	9 October 1916	12 August 1919	Taishō
3		Saitō Makoto (1st term)	斎藤 実	12 August 1919	14 April 1927	Taishō
3		Saitō Makoto (1st term)	斎藤 実	12 August 1919	14 April 1927	Shōwa
4		Ugaki Kazushige (1st term)	宇垣 一成	14 April 1927	10 December 1927	Shōwa
5		Yamanashi Hanzō	山梨 半造	10 December 1927	17 August 1929	Shōwa
(3)		Saitō Makoto (2nd term)	斎藤 実	17 August 1929	17 June 1931	Shōwa
(4)		Ugaki Kazushige (2nd term)	宇垣 一成	17 June 1931	5 August 1936	Shōwa
6		Minami Jirō	南 次郎	5 August 1936	15 June 1942	Shōwa
7		Koiso Kuniaki	小磯 國昭	15 June 1942	12 July 1944	Shōwa
8		Abe Nobuyuki	阿部 信行	12 July 1944	12 September 1945	Shōwa

== See also ==
- Japanese Resident-General of Korea
- List of Japanese residents-general of Korea
- Governor-General of Chōsen
- Governor-General of Taiwan
