= Xingcheng Subdistrict =

Xingcheng Subdistrict may refer to:

- Xingcheng Subdistrict, Beijing, a current subdistrict in Fangshan District, Beijing
- Xingcheng Subdistrict, Changsha, a past subdistrict in Wangcheng District, Changsha, Hunan

== See also ==
- Xincheng Subdistrict (disambiguation)
