= Xincheng Incident =

1896 conflict in Taiwan under Japanese rule

Shinjō Incident
Date	November 1896
Location	Shinjō, Tainan Prefecture, Japanese Taiwan (modern-day Xincheng, Hualien County, Taiwan)
Result	Truku's victory

Belligerents
Truku Tribe	Empire of Japan

Commanders and leaders
Haruq Nawi	(Empire of Japan) Hiroshi Yuji

Strength
20	21

Casualties and losses
Unknown	13

The Shinjō Incident (Chinese: 新城事件) is an event that took place in 1896 in the city of Shinjō (present-day Xincheng), Tainan Prefecture, Taiwan, Empire of Japan. The chief of the Truku tribe, Haruq Nawi, led 20 aboriginal warriors against the Japanese forces, killing 13 Japanese soldiers.

== Background and causes ==
Since the Japanese empire took over Taiwan in 1895, there had been a growing tension between the local aboriginal tribes trying to protect their villages and hunting grounds and the Japanese forces which aimed to take over control of aboriginals lands in order to exploit natural resources.

The Xincheng event was mostly caused by sexual abuses of aboriginal women by Japanese soldiers.

== Consequences ==
After the incident the Japanese forces launched a series of retaliatory attacks on the Truku. Taking advantage of their terrain knowledge, the Truku managed to resist while hiding in their mountain villages. The Japanese were forced to withdraw, and offered amnesty to any that surrendered. After further conflict, the Truku War ended in 1914 with the victory of the Japanese over the Truku people.

== See also ==
- History of Taiwan
- Taiwan under Japanese rule
- Taiwanese indigenous peoples
