= Lin Yueh-han =

Taiwanese footballer

Personal information
- Date of birth: 16 February 1993 (age 33)
- Place of birth: Zhouxi, Hualien, Taiwan
- Height: 1.79 m (5 ft 10 in)
- Position: Defender

Team information
- Current team: Taiwan Power Company

Senior career*
Years	Team	Apps	(Gls)
2011–2012	NTCPE F.C.		
2012–2013	Beijing Baxy		
2014–	Taiwan Power Company		

International career^{‡}
2013–	Chinese Taipei	5	(0)
- * Club domestic league appearances and goals ‡ National team caps and goals as of 30 June 2016

Lin Yueh-han (Chinese: 林約翰; born 16 February 1993) is a Taiwanese footballer who currently plays as a defender for the national and club level. Lin is an indigenous Taiwanese and is of Atayal and Truku descent.
