= Xincheng Township =

Xincheng Township (traditional Chinese: 新城鄉; simplified Chinese: 新城乡) could refer to:

== Mainland China ==
- Xincheng Township, Lintan County, Gansu
- Xincheng Township, Qingshui County, Gansu
- Xincheng Township, Zhenyuan County, Gansu
- Xincheng Township, Songyuan, in Ningjiang District, Songyuan, Jilin
- Xincheng Township, Jingbian County, Shaanxi

== Taiwan ==
- Xincheng, Hualien, township in Hualien City

== See also ==
- Xincheng (disambiguation)
