= Ang (surname) =

Ang is a Hokkien and Teochew romanization of the Chinese surnames Wang (汪, Wāng) and Hong (洪, Hóng).

== Distribution ==
In mainland China and Taiwan, names are recorded in Chinese characters and officially romanized using Hanyu Pinyin.

However, Ang was the 12th-most-common surname among Chinese Singaporeans in the year 2000. In Southeast Asia, most of the Ang descendants have settled in Singapore and Penang of Malaysia. Their ancestors came from mainland China, mostly from Fujian, and some of their history could be traced up to four generations. A significant number of Ang descendants could be found in the Philippines. In the United States, it is much less common: the surname ranked 18,359th in 1990 and 11,317th in the year 2000.

== Notable people ==
- Betty Ang, Filipina businesswoman of Chinese descent
- Justin Ang, Singaporean radio presenter
- Ang Peng Siong, Singaporean Olympian and competitive swimmer

== See also ==
- Ang (disambiguation)
- Ant (name)
- Wang and Hong, for other romanizations & history
