= Shih Wei-Liang =

Taiwanese composer

Shih Wei-Liang (September 3, 1926 – February 14, 1977) was a Taiwanese composer, ethnomusicologist and one of the most influential and representative figures in the modern history of Taiwanese music, who made outstanding contributions to Taiwanese National Music. He died of lung cancer in 1977 at the age of 50.

== Early life ==
Shih Wei-Liang was born in Yingkou City, Liaoning Province. During the Sino-Japanese War, he participated in the underground anti-Japanese work of the Chinese Nationalist Party’s “Northeast China Party Affairs Commissioner” under the pseudonym “Shi-Li.” In his teens, Shih participated in underground intelligence work as a disguised printing factory worker and was later arrested and imprisoned. After World War II, Shih Wei-Liang, who originally studied music at the National Beijing Art College, moved to Taiwan in 1949 as an exiled student due to the outbreak of the Chinese Civil War and enrolled in the second grade of the Music Department at National Taiwan Normal University. During this period, he participated in the art performing group of the “China Youth Anti-Communist National Salvation Corps” (the predecessor of the China Youth National Salvation Corps), actively participated in various armed forces entertainment activities, and created many patriotic songs such as “ROC 40 Chorus: for a Bright Future” and “Anti-Communist Chorus.” After graduation, Shih taught at numerous educational institutions, including Affiliated Primary School of Taipei Teachers College, Affiliated Senior High School of National Taiwan Normal University, Affiliated Taoyuan Agricultural and Industrial Senior High School of National Taipei University of Technology, National Keelung Senior High School, and National Taipei University of Education. Also during this period of time, he produced and hosted the broadcast program “Concert Hall on Air” on the Broadcasting Corporation of China.

== Experience of Studying Abroad ==
In 1955, Shih Wei-Liang passed the Study Abroad Examination of the Ministry of Education. However, at that time, he could not afford to go abroad because of his financial situation. With the help of several friends who raised money for him, he finally went abroad. Shih Wei-Liang entered the Madrid Royal Conservatory to major in composition, but he was disappointed that his professors in their old age were not inspiring for his pursuit of the latest knowledge. The following year (1959), with the help of Father Alois Osterwalder from the Society of the Divine Word, he obtained a scholarship and was transferred to Vienna Conservatory to continue his studies. Later (1960), he went to Stuttgart to study composition under the contemporary master Johann Nepomuk David (1895-1977), whom he had long been fond of. During his stay in Europe, Shih collected information from all over the place to compile a biography of the Hungarian composer, Béla Bartók (1881-1945) in Mandarin. However, the book collection in the library in Stuttgart could not meet his needs, so he went to the library in Vienna to find all the reference books, scores, and records he needed.

During his study in Europe, Shih struggled financially and worked various jobs to support himself, including as a miner in Spain, a porter in Germany, and a worker at an electrical plant in Bonn. After returning to Taiwan, he documented his experiences in Europe in his next book, A Chinese in Europe.

== Career ==
In late 1964, Shih Wei-Liang returned to Taiwan after six years of study in Europe. Shih founded China Youth Music Library in Taipei in 1965. He took on several roles in the music education field, serving as a music teacher at Affiliated Senior High School of National Taiwan Normal University, conductor of National Taiwan Symphony Orchestra, and director of the Music Department at National Taiwan University of Arts. Being a dedicated advocate for arts education, Shih chose to teach in elementary schools to instill love for the arts in young students. In 1973, he established music programs at Shuang Shih Junior High School and Taipei Municipal Kuangfu Elementary School to provide students with greater access to music education. Besides, Shih was passionate about collecting folk songs and aboriginal songs, and he preserved songs from Amis, Saisiyat, and Atayal peoples.
