= Truku War =

Uprising against colonial Japanese forces in Japanese Taiwan in 1914

Truku war
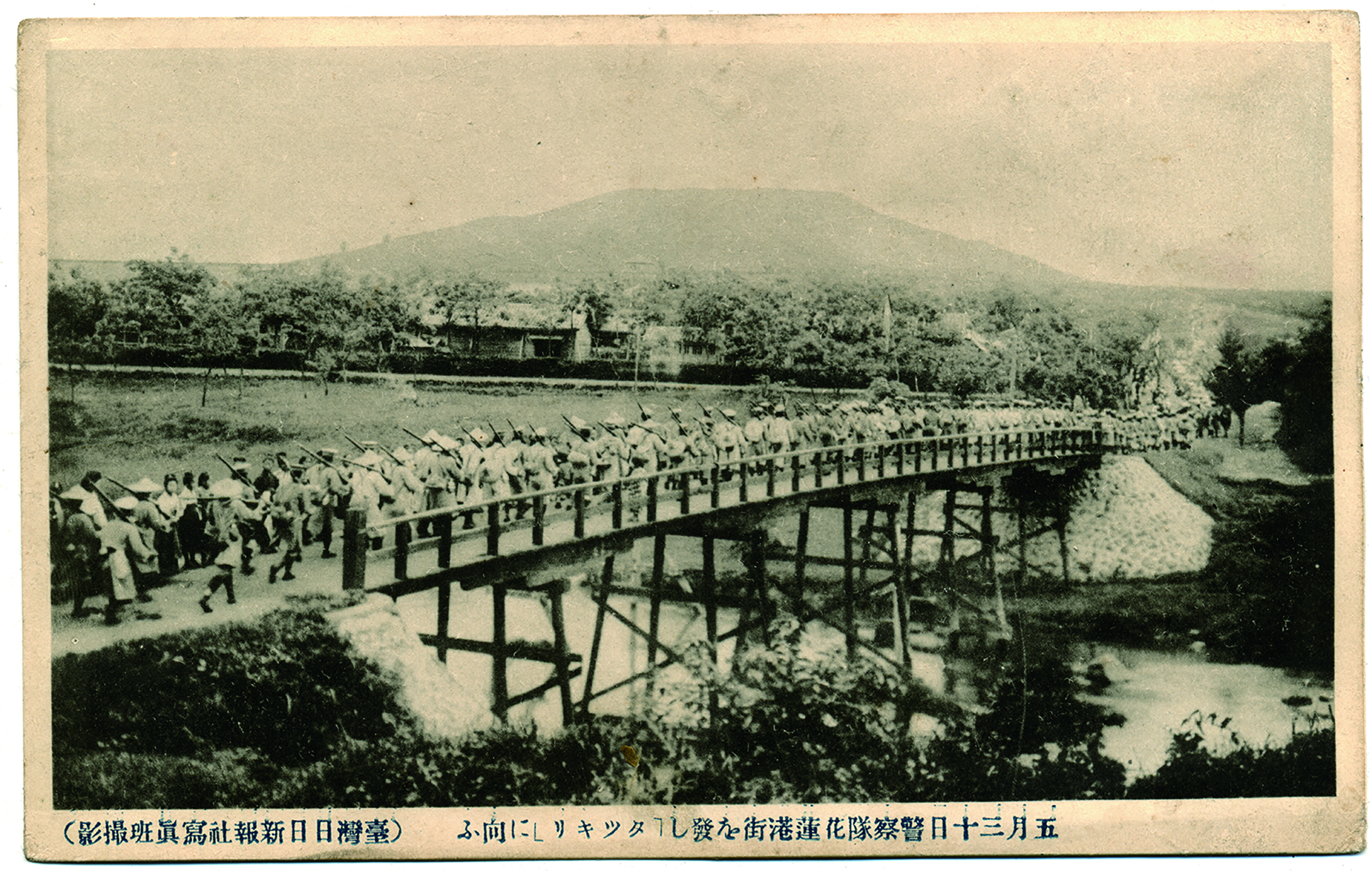
- Police forces set off from Karenkō for Tkijig in Truku area
Date	May – August 1914
Location	Karen District, Karenkō Prefecture, Japanese Taiwan (modern-day Hualien County, Taiwan)
Result	Japanese victory

Belligerents
Truku Tribe	Empire of Japan

Commanders and leaders
Holok Naowi (surrendered)	(Empire of Japan) Siyat Teymu

Strength
~3,000–5,000	~11,075

Casualties and losses
Unknown	~364

The Truku War (Chinese: 太魯閣戰爭; pinyin: Tàilǔgé Zhànzhēng, Truku language: Tnegjyalan Truku) was a series of events that happened between May and August 1914, involving the Truku indigenous group in an uprising against colonial Japanese forces in Japanese Taiwan.

The conflict's main scope was around the area today known as Hualien County, up until then controlled by the Truku people. Since the beginning of the Japanese rule of Taiwan in 1895, the Truku Tribe was seen as a major target in that area and for many years before the capitulation. Sakuma Samata, the Governor-General of Taiwan employed massive resources in order to contain and overpower the resistance of Truku warriors, mobilizing as many as 20,000 soldiers and police officers in the field against a population of about 2,000 aboriginals. During a battle, Sakuma Samata was seriously injured but in the second half of August 1914, the Japanese declared victory over the Truku and on August 28, the Governor-General of Taiwan declared the end of the war.

== Background ==
In 1896, due to the rising anger of the Truku people, Japanese Second Lieutenant Yuuki and his 21 subordinates were ambushed and killed in Xincheng, Hualien. This episode is known as the Xincheng Incident. In 1906, the Weili Incident resulted in the death of 36 people including Japanese merchants and those in the Hualien Administrative Division due to the dispute of the Truku people over the Japanese monopoly on production of natural camphor.

Governor-General of Taiwan Sakuma Samata's ultimate goal was to attack the Truku tribe and take control of the mountainous area in Hualien to exploit the natural resources such as minerals and wood. In 1913, the Governor-General of Taiwan gave orders to the relative divisions to evaluate and assess the population of the locals in the Hualien/Taroko area. The Truku people resided in eastern Taiwan and were mostly isolated by natural barriers such as rivers, cliffs and the coastline. There were 15 villages in Btulan area, 33 villages in the outer Taroko area, and 46 villages in the inner Taroko area, with a total population of around 15,000 people. About 5,000 of them were able to join the war. It is estimated that the local aboriginals were equipped with more than 2,000 modern weapons like Mausers, Murata rifles, Winchester rifles, and Matchlocks with about 50,000 rounds of ammunition.

== War ==
Sakuma Samata, at that time Governor-General of Taiwan, employed massive resources in order to contain and overpower the resistance of Truku warriors, mobilizing as many as 20,000 soldiers and police officers on the field against a population of about 2,000 aboriginals. During a battle, Sakuma Samata was seriously injured. In the second half of August 1914, the Japanese declared victory over the Truku and on August 28, the Governor-General of Taiwan declared the end of the war.

== Consequences ==
After the war, the Governor-General of Taiwan conducted the restoration of damaged bridges, roads, and local police posts. The weapons owned by the aboriginals were confiscated and the escaped aboriginal tribal people were pacified. New subdivisions under Hualien Administrative Division were set up in Xincheng and inner-Taroko areas. Further police forces were introduced into remote mountain areas taking thorough and full control of the aboriginal neighborhoods. Many Truku people were moved in groups to the plains and were scattered into many different locations. Some were moved to Han Taiwanese neighborhoods as well. By taking this action, the Japanese hoped to undermine the Truku's social structure, traditional culture and beliefs. Aboriginal Children's Education Centers were introduced in every police administrative areas in order to promote Japanese culture.

Traditional tribal lifestyles and means of self-sustenance of Truku people such as hunting and local farming were also discouraged, pushing for the development of fixed-farming agriculture such as silk, ramie, and tobacco.

== See also ==
- History of Taiwan
