= Xincheng Subdistrict =

Xincheng Subdistrict may refer to the following locations in the People's Republic of China:

== 新城街道 ==
=== Anhui ===
- Xincheng Subdistrict, Huangshan, in Huangshan District, Huangshan City, Anhui

=== Gansu ===
- Xincheng Subdistrict, Jiuquan, in Suzhou District, Jiuquan, Gansu

=== Heilongjiang ===
- Xincheng Subdistrict, Xiangfang, in Xiangfang District, Harbin, Heilongjiang

=== Henan ===
- Xincheng Subdistrict, Jiaozuo, in Shanyang District, Jiaozuo, Henan
- Xincheng Subdistrict, Shangqiu, in Suiyang District, Shangqiu, Henan
- Xincheng Subdistrict, Zhengzhou, in Huiji District, Zhengzhou, Henan

=== Hunan ===
- Xincheng Subdistrict, Longshan County, in Longshan County, Hunan

=== Inner Mongolia ===
- Xincheng Subdistrict, Arxan, in Arxan, Inner Mongolia
- Xincheng Subdistrict, Ergun, in Ergun, Inner Mongolia

=== Jiangsu ===
- Xincheng Subdistrict, Yancheng, in Tinghu District, Yancheng, Jiangsu

=== Liaoning ===
- Xincheng Subdistrict, Donggang, Liaoning, in Donggang, Liaoning
- Xincheng Subdistrict, Kaiyuan, Liaoning, in Kaiyuan, Liaoning
- Xincheng Subdistrict, Xinmin, in Xinmin, Liaoning

=== Shaanxi ===
- Xincheng Subdistrict, Ankang, in Hanbin District, Ankang, Shaanxi
- Xincheng Subdistrict, Hancheng, in Hancheng, Shaanxi

=== Shandong ===
- Xincheng Subdistrict, Dong'e County, in Dong'e County, Shandong
- Xincheng Subdistrict, Feicheng, in Feicheng, Shandong
- Xincheng Subdistrict, Weifang, in Kuiwen District, Weifang, Shandong

=== Shanxi ===
- Xincheng Subdistrict, Taiyuan, in Jiancaoping District, Taiyuan, Shanxi

=== Xinjiang ===
- Xincheng Subdistrict, Aksu, Xinjiang, in Aksu, Xinjiang
- Xincheng Subdistrict, Korla, in Korla, Xinjiang
- Xincheng Subdistrict, Shihezi, in Shihezi, Xinjiang
- Xincheng Subdistrict, Tacheng, in Tacheng, Xinjiang

=== Zhejiang ===
- Xincheng Subdistrict, Jiaxing, in Xiuzhou District, Jiaxing, Zhejiang

== Other written forms ==
- Xincheng Subdistrict, Harbin (新成街道), in Xiangfang District, Harbin, Heilongjiang
- Xincheng Subdistrict, Rui'an (莘塍街道), in Rui'an, Zhejiang

== See also ==
- Xingcheng Subdistrict (disambiguation)
