= Xincheng Town =

Xincheng could refer to the following towns in China:

- Xincheng Town, Jiaxing (新塍镇), in Xiuzhou District, Jiaxing, Zhejiang

== Gansu ==
- Xincheng, Jiayuguan, first-order division of Jiayuguan City
- Xincheng, Lanzhou, in Xigu District, Lanzhou
- Xincheng Town, Lintan County, in Lintan County
- Xincheng Township, Qingshui, in Tianshui

== Hebei ==
- Xincheng, Gaobeidian
- Xincheng, Shahe
- Xincheng, Xinji

== Jiangxi ==
- Xincheng, Dayu County, in Dayu County
- Xincheng, Jinggangshan, in Jinggangshan City

== Shanxi ==
- Xincheng, Xiangfen County, in Xiangfen County
- Xincheng, Youyu County, in Youyu County
- Xincheng, Yuanqu County, in Yuanqu County

== Elsewhere ==
- Xincheng, Guangdong, in Xinxing County
- Xincheng, Huachuan County, Heilongjiang
- Xincheng, Hubei, in Dawu County
- Xincheng, Yizheng, Jiangsu
- Xincheng, Huantai County, Shandong
- Xincheng, Sichuan, in Zhaojue County
- Xincheng, Tianjin, in Binhai New Area
