= A Rainy Night at the Port =

1958 Song composed by Yang San-lang

"港都夜雨"

Song
- English title: A Rainy Night at the Port
- Composer: Yang San-lang
- Lyricist: Lü Chuanzi

A Rainy Night at the Port (Chinese: 港都夜雨; Pe̍h-ōe-jī: Káng-Too Iā-ú) is a Taiwanese Hokkien pop song released in 1958, composed by Yang San-lang with lyrics by Lü Chuanzi (呂傳梓). It was inspired by the city of Keelung. Originally, it was composed without lyrics.

== Overview ==
In the early 1960s, Yang San-lang took over as the conductor of the band at the Keelung Landmark Club for American forces in Taiwan, where he also played the trumpet. Keelung, known for its rainy weather, inspired Yang on one such day to compose a sad melody using natural minor and the harmonic minor to perform a sad song on the trumpet, which he called "Rain Blues" (雨的BLUES). He played it every day, to the acclaim of the American soldiers in the audience. The song, however, did not have lyrics until the band's pianist, Lü Chuanzi was inspired to write lyrics to the song, describing the grieved feelings of a traveling young man watching the rain one night in the port city of Keelung. After penning the lyrics, Lü handed them over to the composer of "Mend the Broken Net", Wang Yunfeng (王雲峰) for editing. The resulting lyrics, paired with Yang's original tune, became a favorite song at the Landmark Club.

In 1958, Yang San-lang had Wu Jin-huai perform the song in public, and release the recording.A Protestant group later adapted the tune to new lyrics, turning it into a hymn.
