= List of Japanese residents-general of Korea =

The resident-general was the leader of Korea under Japanese rule from 1905 to 1910.

Itō Hirobumi was the first resident-general. There were three residents-general in total. After the annexation of Korea to Japan, the last resident-general, Terauchi Masatake, became the first governor-general.

All names on the list follow Eastern convention (family name followed by given name).

Color key (for political parties)

None
Kenseitō — Kenseikai
Rikken Seiyūkai
Rikken Minseitō
Military
Rikken Dōshikai
Taisei Yokusankai
The Imperial Family
Socialist
Democratic (1947, 1954)
Liberal Democratic
Japan New
Renewal
Democratic

== Residents-general ==
A#	I#	Portrait	Name		Took office	Left office	Political party	Monarchs served
A#	I#	Portrait	Rōmaji	Kanji	Took office	Left office	Political party	Monarchs served
1	1		Itō Hirobumi	伊藤 博文	21 December 1905	14 June 1909	None	Meiji
2	2		Sone Arasuke	曾禰 荒助	14 June 1909	30 May 1910	None	Meiji
3	3		Terauchi Masatake	寺内 正毅	30 May 1910	1 October 1910	None	Meiji

== See also ==
- Japanese Resident-General of Korea
- Japanese Governor-General of Korea
- List of Japanese governors-general of Korea
- Governor-General of Taiwan
