= Lumachan railway station =

Railway station in Zhuqi, Chiayi County, Taiwan

Lumachan Station 鹿麻產車站
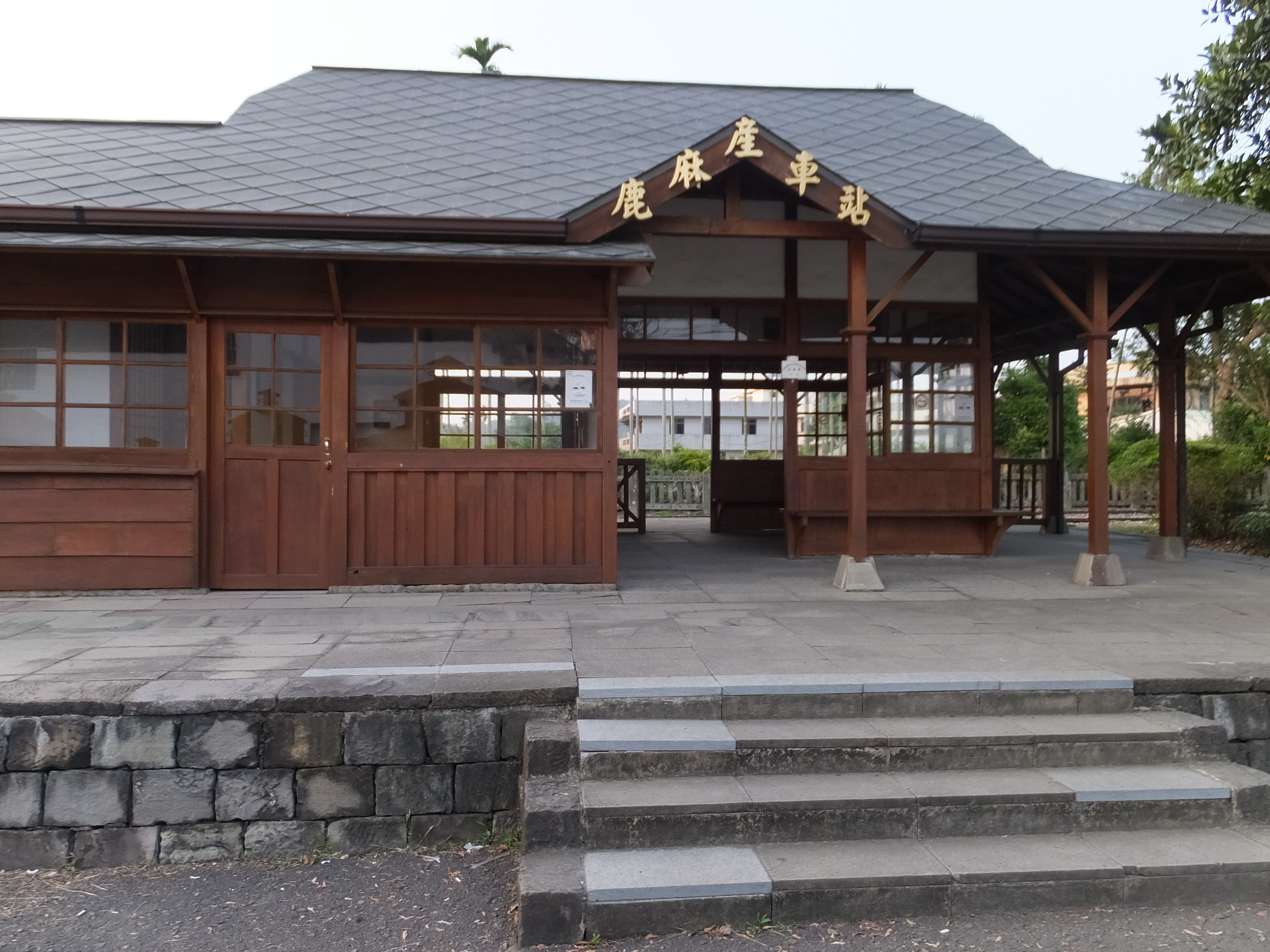

General information
- Location: Zhuqi, Chiayi County, Taiwan
- Coordinates: 23°30′14″N 120°31′53″E
- Owner: Forestry and Nature Conservation Agency
- Operator: Alishan Forest Railway
- Line: Alishan

History
- Opened: 1 October 1910

Services
Preceding station	Alishan Forest Railway	Following station
Zhuqi towards Alishan	Main line	Beimen towards Chiayi
Location

Lumachan (Chinese: 鹿麻產車站; pinyin: Lùmáchǎn Chēzhàn) is a railway station on the Alishan Forest Railway line located in Zhuqi Township, Chiayi County, Taiwan.

== History ==
The station building was originally constructed in 1910 during the Japanese rule. The service stopped in November 1982 after the opening of Provincial Highway 18. As the tourism activities in the area started to grow in the 2000s, the station was restored in December 2004. The station master quarter was restored in April 2006.

== Architecture ==
The station is located 82 meters above sea level.

== Around the station ==
- Renyitan Dam

== See also ==
- List of railway stations in Taiwan
