= Seediq language =

Austronesian language spoken in Taiwan

Seediq
- Kari Seediq / Truku
- Native to: Taiwan
- Region: central, eastern, and coastal
- Ethnicity: Seediq, Taroko
- Native speakers: 20,000 (2008)
- Language family: Austronesian: Atayalic; Seediq
- Writing system: Latin (Seediq alphabet)

Language codes
- ISO 639-3: trv
- Glottolog: taro1264
- ELP: Seediq
- Linguasphere: 30-AAB
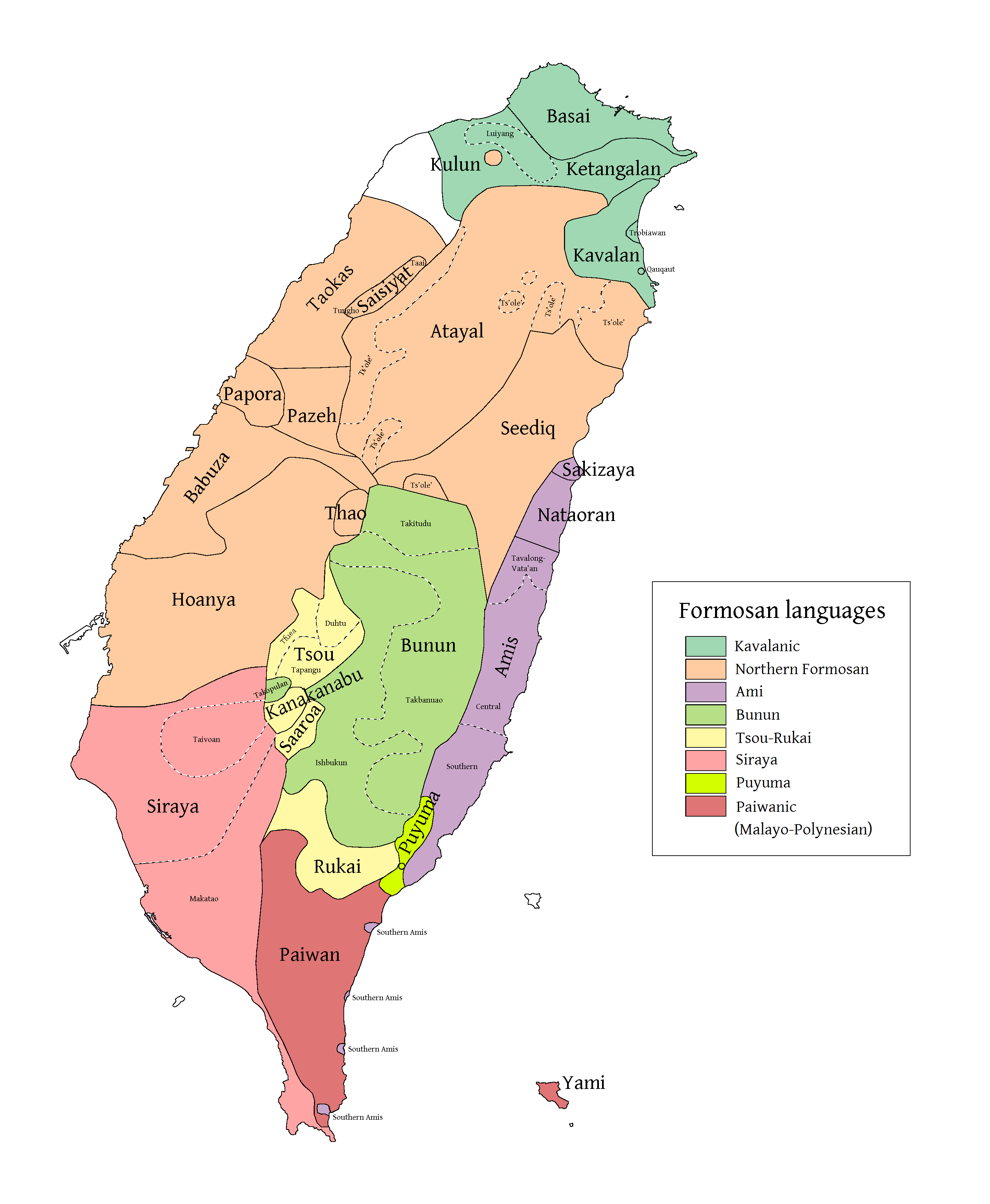

- Taroko is classified as Vulnerable by the UNESCO Atlas of the World's Languages in Danger

Seediq, also known as Sediq and Truku (previously transcribed as Taroko), is an Atayalic language spoken in the mountains of Northern Taiwan by the Seediq and Taroko people.

== Subdivisions ==
Seediq consists of three main dialects (Tsukida 2005). Members of each dialect group refer to themselves by the name of their dialect, while the Amis people call them "Taroko".

1. Truku (Truku) – 20,000 members including non-speakers. Transcribed 德路固 (Délùgù) in Chinese.
2. Toda (Tuuda) – 2,500 members including non-speakers.
3. Tgdaya (Tkdaya, Paran) – 2,500 members including non-speakers.

== Phonology ==
=== Truku dialect ===
In the Truku dialect of Seediq there are 19 consonant phonemes and 4 vowel phonemes.

==== Consonants ====
The consonants are the following:

		Labial	Alveolar	Palatal	Velar	Uvular	Glottal
Nasal		m	n		ŋ ⟨ng⟩		
Plosive	voiceless	p	t	(c) ⟨c⟩	k	q	ʔ ⟨ʼ⟩
Plosive	voiced	b	d	(ɟ) ⟨j⟩			
Affricate			(ts) ⟨c⟩				
Fricative	voiceless		s		x		h
Fricative	voiced				ɣ ⟨g⟩		
Approximant			l	j ⟨y⟩	w		
Tap			ɾ ⟨r⟩				

- /t, d/ are realized as [c, ɟ] after /i, j/. [c, ɟ] are allophones, not phonemes, but they are represented in the orthography.
- /ts/ has a marginal phonological status and is found in some interjections (such as teʼcu! 'what a mess!'), loanwords and non-finite verbal forms with the gerund prefix cese-.

==== Vowels ====
The monophthongs and diphthongs are the following:

	Front	Central	Back
Close	i		u
Mid		ə ⟨e⟩	
Open		a	

	Front	Back
Close		ui̯ ⟨uy⟩
Open	ai̯ ⟨ay⟩	au̯ ⟨aw⟩

=== Phonotactics ===
Seediq syllables have C, CV, or CVC structures, except for some interjections which have CVCC structures (e.g. saws, which is uttered when offering food to ancestors, and sawp, which is the sound of an object blown by the wind). Disyllabic words can take on the following structures:

- CVCV, CVCVC
- CVCCV, CVCCVC

Vowels in antepenultimate syllables are often /ə/. The stressed syllable is usually the penultimate one, and is pronounced with a high pitch. In the Truku dialect stress is on the final syllable resulting in loss of first vowel in CVCCV and CVCCVC structures, for example compare: qduriq > pqdriqun, lqlaqi > lqlqian. In Taroko, up to six onset consonants are possible (similar to Georgian): CCCCCVC(VC), for example: tnʼghngkawas, mptrqdug, pngkrbkan, dmptbrinah.

== Morphology ==
As other Austronesian languages, Seediq uses reduplication to convey grammatical functions, such as pluralization and reciprocal verb form derivation. There are two kinds of reduplication: one which involves only the first syllable of the stem, with structure Cə-CV(C), and one which involves the last pair of syllables of the stem excluding codas, having structure CəCə-CV(C)CV(C). Examples are:

qehuni → qe-qehuni
tree {} REDUP-tree
"tree" {} "trees"

seʼdiq → sede-seʼdiq
person {} REDUP-person
"person" {} "people"

Along with reduplication, there are also numerous prefixes and suffixes in Seediq that intervene to alter the meaning of words in derivational and inflectional processes. Affixes include:

- -an: oblique case
- ne-: something possessed by the prefixed noun

Clitics, unlike affixes, do not cause phonological alterations on their roots to which they are attached.

=== Verbs ===
Seediq verbs have three types of voices, which are in turn inflected for mood or aspect (Tsukida 2005:313). Nouns, however, do not inflect for voice.

1. Agent voice – marked by -em- or its allomorphs me or Ø
2. Goal voice
3. Conveyance voice

There are four basic aspect/mood categories:

1. Neutral – same as non-future/imperfective
2. Perfect – marked by -en-
3. Non-finite – bare stem
4. Hortative (i.e., when advising someone) – marked by -a(y/nay)

The future is marked by me-, mpe-, mpe-ke-.

There are a total of five different verb classes (conjugation paradigms). Other verb forms include causatives, reciprocals, and reflexives. Serial verb constructions are also allowed.

== Word classes ==
Truku Seediq has 11 word classes (Tsukida 2005:295).

Open classes

- Nouns
- Verbs
- Adjectives

Closed classes

- Numerals
- Personal pronouns
- Deictics
- Adverbs
- Conjunctives
- Prepositions
- Interjections
- Sentence final particles

Like many other Formosan and Philippine languages, Seediq nouns and verbs behave similarly. Adjectives can be considered as a subcategory of verbs.

== Syntax ==
The word order of Seediq is verb–object–subject (VOS), where S corresponds to the argument marked with absolutive case. This argument ordinarily occurs clause-finally, but may be followed by a topicalized ergative argument. Like many of its other Austronesian relatives, Seediq contains voice morphemes marked on the verb which indicate which of the verb's arguments (agent, patient, etc.) is treated as the subject and thus marked with absolutive case. In noun phrases, modifiers follow the head (Tsukida 2005:304). Unlike Tagalog and many other Philippine languages, there are no linkers connecting the heads and modifiers.

=== Clauses ===
There are three types of Seediq clauses (Tsukida 2005):

1. Interjection clauses
2. Basic clauses
3. Existential/possessive clauses

Basic clauses have predicates (usually initial and consisting of single verbs, adjectives, or noun phrases), subjects, and optionally non-subject arguments and adjuncts.

Subjects can be recognized via (Tsukida 2005):

1. Voice affix
2. Clitic pronoun
3. Quantifier floating
4. Relativization
5. Possessum demotion

=== Function words ===
Some function words are given below:

- ni – "and" (conjunction)
- deni – "and then" (conjunction)
- ʼu, duʼu, ga, dega – all meaning "in case that" (conjunction)
- nasi – "if"
- ʼana – "even"
- ka – subordinating conjunction, case marker, linker
- ʼini – negator
- ʼadi – negates noun phrase predicates, future/perfect verb forms
- wada – past
- naʼa – "had better, could have done..."
- dima – "already"
- hana – "just"
- yaʼasa – "because"
- niqan – existential predicate (like Tagalog "may")
- ʼungat – negative existential predicate (like Tagalog "wala")

Deictics include (Tsukida 2009:132-133):

- Demonstratives:
  - niyi – this, this one
  - ga/gaga – that, that one
  - kiya/ki – that, that one (referring to things previously referenced or mutually understood)
- Deictic adverbials:
  - hini – here
  - hi/hiya – there

There are a total of six prepositions (Tsukida 2005:303):

- quri – toward, about, in the direction of
- paʼah – from
- bitaq – until, up to
- saw – like
- ʼasaw – because of
- mawxay – for the sake of

Stative locatives (e.g., "on the mountain") do not take on any prepositions, but are rather placed directly after the verb without any additional marking.

=== Predicate extenders ===
Preverbal elements such as adverbs, demonstratives, and prepositions can be used to extend predicates. Below is a partial list of predicate extenders from Tsukida (2008:308).

1. Extenders that require neutral verb forms
  1. wada – past
  2. ga(ga) – distal progressive
  3. niyi – proximal progressive
  4. gisu – progressive, state
  5. meha – future, "is going to do"
  6. (me-)teduwa – "be able to do"
  7. nasi – "if"
  8. naʼa – "could have done something but did not
2. Extenders that require non-finite verb forms
  1. ʼasi ~ kasi – "at once, suddenly"
  2. pasi – "at once"
  3. kani – "one did not have to do something but did it"
  4. ʼini – negative
  5. ʼiya – negative imperative
3. Extenders that require future forms
  1. saw – "is/was about to do"
  2. rubang – "was about to do"
4. Extenders that require future/perfect forms of verbs/nouns
  1. ʼadi – negative
5. Extenders that are combined with adjectives/nouns
  1. maʼa – "become"
6. Extenders without specific requirements
  1. pekelug – "just"
  2. dima – "already"
  3. hana – "at last"
  4. ʼida – "surely"
  5. yaʼa – uncertainty
  6. wana – only
  7. ʼana – "even"
  8. ma – "why"
  9. ʼalung ~ ʼalaw ~ ʼarang – "as is expected"
  10. pida – exactly
  11. lengu – "planned to do..."
  12. binaw – confirmation
  13. ʼatih – "at the last moment," "nearly"
  14. seperang – "purposefully, on purpose"

== Pronouns ==
Truku Seediq personal pronouns
Type of pronoun	Direct	Oblique	Independent possessive	Subject	Genitive
1s.	yaku	kenan	(ne-)naku	=ku	=mu
2s.	isu	sunan	(ne-)nisu	=su	=su
3s.	hiya	hiyaan	ne-hiya	–	=na
1p. (incl.)	ʼita	tenan	(ne-)nita	=ta	=ta
1p. (excl.)	yami	menani	(ne-)nami	=nami	=nami
2p.	yamu	munan	(ne-)namu	=namu	=namu
3p.	dehiya	dehiyaan	ne-dehiya	-	=deha

== Numerals ==
The cardinal numbers are:

1. kingal
2. deha
3. teru
4. sepat
5. rima
6. mataru
7. mpitu
8. maspat
9. mengari
10. maxal

Other numerals and numeral-related affixes (Tsukida 2005:297):

- taxa: used for humans – one person
- ʼuwin: used for objects – one object
- ma- -(u)l: used to form words for 10, 20, 30, 40, 50
- ma-xa-l: 10
- m-pusa-l: 20
- me-teru-l: 30
- me-sepat-ul: 40
- me-rima-l: 50

== Bibliography ==
- Tsukida, Naomi (2005). "Seediq". In Adelaar, K. Alexander; Himmelmann, Nikolaus (eds.). The Austronesian Languages of Asia and Madagascar. Psychology Press.
- Hsu, Lowking Wei-Cheng 許韋晟 (2008). Tàilǔgé gòucífǎ yánjiū 太魯閣構詞法研究 [Word Formation In Truku] (PDF) (Master's thesis) (in Chinese). Guoli xinzhu jiaoyu daxue. hdl:11296/5xh3f2. Archived (PDF) from the original on 2021-05-04.
