= Hung Tung =

Taiwanese painter (1920–1987)

Hung Tung (Chinese: 洪通; pinyin: Hóng Tong; Pe̍h-ōe-jī: Âng-thong) was a Taiwanese painter who was notable for his folk style and vivid colours. He is said to have had a significant influence on the direction of Taiwanese modern art in the 1970s and was a forerunner in the Taiwanese Nativist art movement.

== Biography ==
Hung was born in 1920 in a fishermen's village in Tainan's Beimen Township. Hung was orphaned as a young child. Raised by impoverished relatives, he was unable to attend school. From an early age, Hung supported himself and his family by doing odd jobs. He also worked as a spirit medium in a Taoist temple. Having no formal education, Hung was illiterate for his entire life.

In 1970, at age 50, Hung started painting without any training. In 1972, he put works on display outside the Nankunshen Temple. A journalist wrote about Hung's works in The Artist Magazine. In 1976, Hung Tung's first major solo exhibition was organised by The Artist magazine at the American Cultural Centre in Taipei, making him a household name overnight in Taiwan.

Hung's popularity throughout Taiwan meant that he received constant requests for paintings. However, he refused to sell any of these works. In later life Hung began to isolate himself. In 1986 Hung's wife died. A year later in 1987, Hung died in his sleep, alone in his workshop.

Hung produced over 300 finished artworks. His art is said to have laid the foundation for the Nativist movement in Taiwan.

After his death, Hung was buried at Nanshan Public Cemetery near Tainan.

== Work ==
Hung Tung's paintings suffuse strange beings, coloured faces, flowers, birds, trees, boats and airplanes with hieroglyphic symbols. These elements give a very childlike spirit and imagination to Hung Tung's works. Also taking inspiration from Taiwanese opera, puppet shows, temple fairs, temple sculptures and ritualized performance troupes, the imagery he adopts infuses his works with elements from Taiwanese folklore, Daoism and mysticism. His paintings adopt a lively palette, and the compositional elements interact on the same plane, since Hung Tung adopts a one-plane perspective. He also used unconventional means of expression by painting with both his left and right hands. Ultimately, the mix of Taiwanese folk tradition with a bright choice of palette and unique sense of perspective adds local flavour and Taiwanese essence to Hung Tung's works.

== Influence ==
In the Nativist movement in Taiwan, artists reawakened to the social reality of their local environment, instead of blindly following Western trends, a number of artists like Hung Tung and Ju Ming directed their attention to folk art to derive inspiration from native surroundings. Hung Tung's works, which depict people's daily lives, are suffused with the brilliant and vibrant contrasting colours of folk art. By incorporating dynamic pictographic symbols, he develops a unique personal language, which, full of magic and illusions that convey the fantastic power of popular belief, shows a lack of concern for western realism. Hung Tung works show how the greatest significance of the Nativist movement was not the just the emergence of home-spun artist, but the widespread concern for using abstract means to explore local themes rooted in the immediate environment to re-evaluate modernist thought.

Ultimately, Hung Tung's contribution extended not only to the birth of the Nativist art movement but was also important in redefining conceptions of the ‘local’ Taiwanese identity. In the 1980s, Taiwanese artists developed strong consciousness about their own subjectivity in response to global and national historical forces, transforming models of Western art and theories into a New Nativist art; Taiwanese art became even more multifaceted.

== Legacy ==
After his death, at least two books in Chinese have been published about him. Yet other than a feature story in Raw Vision Magazine (issue #48) and a few other minor mentions in books and periodicals, Tung's work is almost unknown in the West.

Cheng Chia-yin, the director of the Taipei-based drama troupe Puppet and Its Double, is inspired by Hung Tung's life story. His vision for unveiling Tung's life in the project "Who's Hung Tung?" (洪通計劃), in the 2011 Taipei Arts Festival has brought about a three part project. The drama, documentary and exhibition show the life of Hung Tung, as he went from being an illiterate labourer to becoming a highly accomplished painter.

== Major exhibitions ==
- 1976, the American Cultural Centre in Taipei
- September 1987 the American Cultural Center in Taipei, retrospective exhibition.
- 1997 Tainan Municipal Cultural Center exhibition by Hung's son Hung Shih-bao.
- During the 1990s, Hung Tung's paintings were exhibited in the US, Germany, France and Belgium.
- April 30, 2011, “The Imaginary Dreamland of Hung Tung” exhibition in Taoyuan. Over 116 paintings shown.

== See also ==
- History of Taiwan
- Culture of Taiwan
- Taiwanese art

== Bibliography ==
- Chang, F.W. ed., Contemporary Taiwanese Art in the Era of Contention, Taipei Fine Arts Museum, Taipei, 2004.
- Lu, V., Striving for Identity in the Maze of Power Struggles: A brief Introduction for the development of the Contemporary Art in Taiwan in Gao, Minglu ed., Inside/Out: New Chinese Art, University of California Press, Berkeley, Los Angeles and London 1998, pp. 167–175. ISBN 978-0-520-21748-5
- --- Taiwan art, 1945–1993, Taipei Fine Arts Museum, Taipei, 1993.
