= Taroko people =

Indigenous Taiwanese ethnic group

Taroko people 太魯閣族
Truku
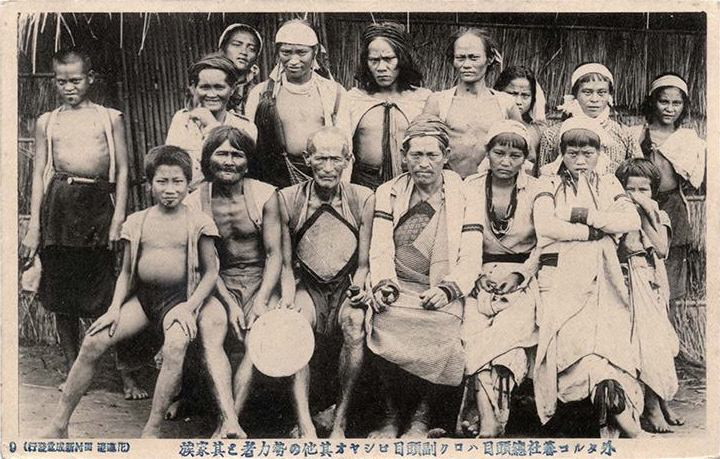
- The families of the outer Truku chief-general and deputy chief-general

Total population
- 32,333 (January 2020)

Regions with significant populations
- Taiwan

Languages
- Truku, Mandarin

Religion
- Animism, Christianity

Related ethnic groups
- Other Taiwanese indigenous peoples Especially Atayals and Seediq

The Taroko people (Chinese: 太魯閣族; pinyin: Tàilǔgézú), also known as Truku people, are an Indigenous Taiwanese people living primarily in Wanrong Township, Xiulin Township, and Zhuoxi Township, Hualien County, Eastern Taiwan. Taroko is also the name of the area of Taiwan where the Taroko reside. The Executive Yuan, Republic of China has officially recognized the Taroko since 15 January 2004. The Taroko are the 12th Indigenous group in Taiwan to receive this recognition.

Previously, the Taroko and the related Seediq people were classified in the Atayal group. The Taroko people demanded a separate status for themselves in a "name rectification" campaign.

The Taroko resisted and fought the Japanese in the 1914 Truku War.

== Notable people ==
- Bokeh Kosang, actor and singer
- Chen Tao-ming, politician
- Lin Yueh-han, footballer
- Tseng Shu-chin, singer

== Clothing ==
The traditional attire of the Truku people is predominantly fashioned from linen, with wool and cotton also being viable materials. The intricate process of crafting garments, accessories, or bedding involves several stages, including spinning, bleaching, and warping. Subsequently, the tribe's women skillfully weave flax in diverse colors, primarily encompassing shades of green, yellow, red, black, and white as a foundational palette.

Typically, men's attire consists of a sleeveless square jacket featuring a breast pocket. This square garment system incorporates long strips sewn into white ramie cloth. Two straps are affixed to both ends of the upper edge of the breast pocket, alongside two others on each side, facilitating fastening behind the neck and back. Chiefs and warriors distinguish themselves with shell clothes adorned with cylindrical shell ornaments.

Women's common attire comprises a black headdress embellished with colorful diamond shapes, a vivid blue top, and a black skirt, secured with two strips around the breast and waist. Additionally, women have two black leggings on their calves and ankles.

While variations in technique, style and texture exist across regions, the Truku people universally incorporate geometric lines and rhombus patterns as shared symbols aligned with their beliefs. Horizontal lines symbolize the path leading to the spiritual bridge, while the diamond pattern represents the ancestral spirit's vigilant eye, signifying protection.

== See also ==
- Truku language
- Mona Rudao
- Musha Incident
- Truku War
- Taiwanese indigenous peoples
- Taroko Tatuk
