= Andō Sadayoshi =

Japanese general

Junior Second Rank Baron Andō Sadayoshi
- 安東 貞美
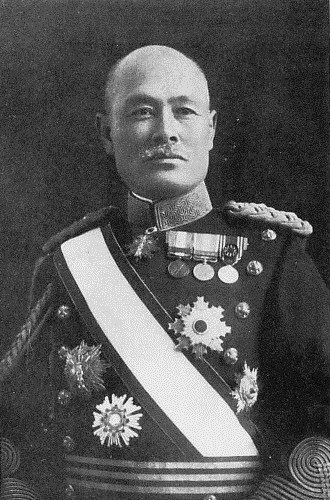

Governor-General of Taiwan
- In office 1 May 1915 – 6 June 1918
- Monarch: Taishō
- Preceded by: Sakuma Samata
- Succeeded by: Akashi Motojiro

Personal details
- Born: 21 September 1853 Iida, Shinano, Japan
- Died: 29 August 1932 (aged 78) Ushigome, Tokyo, Japan
- Resting place: Aoyama Cemetery
- Awards: Order of the Golden Kite (2nd class); Order of the Rising Sun with Paulownia Flowers

Military service
- Allegiance: Empire of Japan
- Branch/service: Imperial Japanese Army
- Years of service: 1872–1923
- Rank: General
- Commands: IJA 2nd Division, Imperial Japanese Army Academy; Army War College (Japan), IJA 10th Division, IJA 12th Division, Chosen Army
- Battles/wars: Satsuma Rebellion; Russo-Japanese War

Baron Andō Sadayoshi (安東 貞美, Andō Sadayoshi; 21 September 1853 – 29 August 1932), also known as Andō Teibi, was a general in the Imperial Japanese Army and Governor-General of Taiwan from 1 May 1915 to 6 June 1918.

== Biography ==
Andō was a native of Iida city in Shinano Province (present-day Nagano Prefecture). He was born to a samurai family; his father was a retainer of the Matsumoto Domain.

Andō entered the Osaka Rikugun Heigakko (the forerunner of the Imperial Japanese Army Academy) in 1871 and was commissioned as a lieutenant in the infantry in June 1872. Promoted to lieutenant in November 1874, he was wounded while participating with the pro-Imperial forces in the Satsuma Rebellion after which he was promoted to captain in May 1877. After returning to the Army Staff College, he was promoted to major in February 1883, remaining within the IJA 2nd Division.

Andō's rise through the ranks was thereafter steady, with promotions to lieutenant-colonel in April 1891 and to colonel on 1 December 1894. He served as Commandant at both the Imperial Japanese Army Academy and at the Army Staff College. He was promoted to major general when the 2nd Division was assigned to Taiwan on 1 October 1898.

Andō was later active in the Russo-Japanese War. He was promoted to lieutenant-general and given command of the IJA 10th Division from 15 January 1905. He was thus at the crucial Battle of Mukden.

On 21 September 1907, Andō was elevated to the title of danshaku (baron) in the kazoku peerage system. In 1910, he was transferred to command the IJA 12th Division, and in 1912 became commander of the Chōsen Army in Korea.

On 1 May 1915, he replaced Gen. Samata Sakuma as Governor-General of Taiwan, and held that position till June 1918. The Tapani Incident, a large scale uprising against Japanese rule, occurred during his tenure. Work also began on the development of Taiwan's forest resources on Taiping and Pa-hsien Mountains, as well as construction on the Yilan and Pingtung railway lines. He entered the reserves in August 1918 and retired from the army in April 1923.

Andō was awarded the Order of the Rising Sun (1st class with Paulownia Blossoms, Grand Cordon) posthumously.

== See also ==
- Taiwan under Japanese rule
