= Sakuma Samata =

Japanese general (1844–1915)

Senior Second Rank Count Sakuma Samata
- 佐久間 左馬太
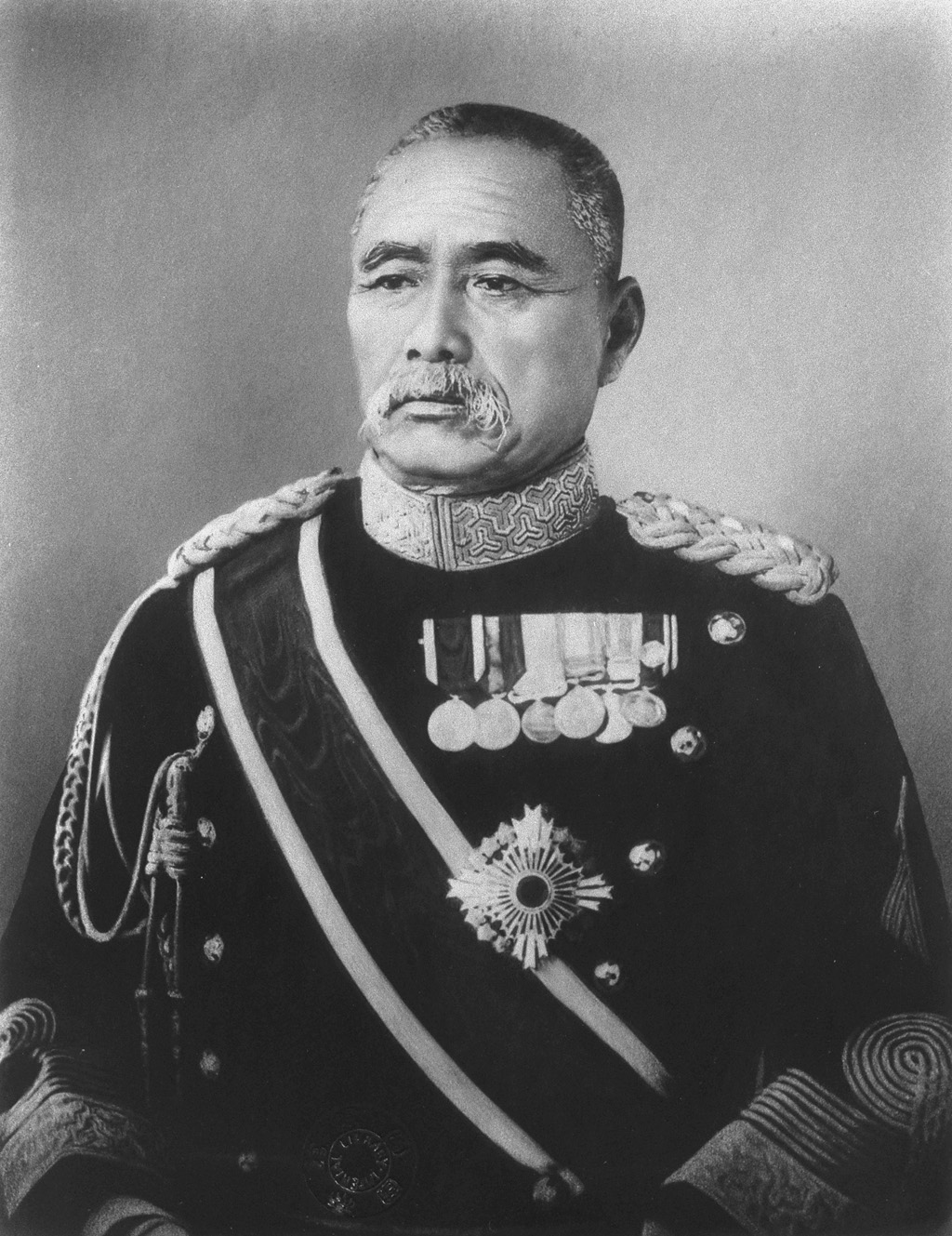

5th Governor-General of Taiwan
- In office 11 April 1906 – 1 May 1915
- Monarchs: Meiji; Taishō
- Preceded by: Kodama Gentarō
- Succeeded by: Andō Teibi

Personal details
- Born: 19 November 1844 Nagato, Chōshū, Japan
- Died: 5 August 1915 (aged 70) Sendai, Miyagi, Japan

Military service
- Allegiance: Empire of Japan
- Branch/service: Imperial Japanese Army
- Years of service: 1871–1915
- Rank: General
- Battles/wars: Boshin War; Satsuma Rebellion; First Sino-Japanese War; Truku War

General Count Sakuma Samata (佐久間 左馬太; 19 November 1844 – 5 August 1915) was a general in the Imperial Japanese Army, and 5th Governor-General of Taiwan from 11 April 1906 to 1 May 1915. He participated in domestic conflicts, wars with Russia and was a leader of the expedition of Taiwan.

== Biography ==
Sakuma was born in Ōtsu District, Nagato Province (present day Nagato, Yamaguchi), as the younger son of Okamura Magoshichi, a samurai of Chōshū Domain, and was later adopted into the Sakuma family. He studied Western military science under Ōmura Masujirō and was a company commander defending the domain against the Second Chōshū expedition mounted by the Tokugawa shogunate in 1866. He subsequently served in the Boshin War of the Meiji restoration with distinction at the Battle of Aizu. In 1872, he entered the fledgling Imperial Japanese Army as a captain.

In February 1874, Sakuma participated in the suppression of the Saga Rebellion, during which time he led a column of troops from Kumamoto Castle. He then participated in the Taiwan Expedition of 1874, where on May 22 he commanded the 150 strong force of soldiers that was ambushed by aborigines, initiating the Battle of Stone Gate. During the Satsuma Rebellion, he was commander of the IJA 6th Infantry Regiment. He was promoted to colonel in 1878. In February 1881, Sakuma was promoted to major general in command of the Sendai military district.

In May 1885, Sakuma was given command of the IJA 10th Infantry Brigade and promoted to lieutenant general the following year. The same year, 1886, he was elevated to the title of danshaku (baron) under the kazoku peerage system.

With the outbreak of the First Sino-Japanese War, Sakuma commanded the IJA 2nd Division at the Battle of Weihaiwei, and later served as Japanese military governor of Weihaiwei in Shandong Province, China. At the end of the war, he was awarded the Grand Cordon of Order of the Rising Sun, and elevated to shishaku (viscount).

In 1898, Sakuma was appointed commander of the central division of the Imperial Guards, and became a full general. After a brief period on leave, he then became commander of the Tokyo Garrison. In April 1906, after his appointment as 5th Governor-General of Taiwan, Sakuma was awarded the Order of the Rising Sun (1st class with Paulownia Blossoms, Grand Cordon), and in 1907 was elevated to hakushaku (Count).

With the end of armed resistance by Han Taiwanese population, the colonial authorities turned their attention to the suppression of the mountain dwelling aboriginal tribes. One of the reasons Sakuma was selected to head the colonial government was due to his participation in Japan's previous 1874 campaign, and his mission extended Japanese control into the aboriginal regions. During his tenure, Sakuma led several armed campaigns against the Atayal, Bunun and Truku peoples. Sakuma was one of the longest-serving governor-generals of Taiwan. He died of severe wounds inflicted during the war with the Truku tribes. The Japanese used 200 machine guns and 10,000 soldiers against the Aboriginals, but grievous wounds were inflicted upon the Japanese Governor-General Sakuma. He was highly regarded by the Japanese administration for helping develop Taiwan's east coast, especially the port of Hualien, and the Taroko Gorge area.

He is also credited with introducing baseball to Taiwan in 1910.

After his death, he became a kami under State Shinto, and a shrine was erected in his honor in Sagamihara, Kanagawa Prefecture, and in Taihoku (present-day Taipei). The shrine in Japan still exists.

== Decorations ==
- 1882 – Order of the Rising Sun, 3rd class
- 1887 – Order of the Rising Sun, 2nd class
- 1895 – Grand Cordon of the Order of the Rising Sun
- 1906 – Order of the Rising Sun with Paulownia Flowers

== See also ==
- Taiwan under Japanese rule

== Footnotes ==
=== References ===
- Ching, Leo T. S. (2001). Becoming Japanese: Colonial Taiwan and the Politics of Identity Formation. University of California Press. ISBN 0-520-22553-8.
- Roy, Denny (2003). Taiwan: A Political History. Cornell University Press. ISBN 0-8014-8805-2.
- Weisenfield, Gennifer (2001). Visual Cultures of Japanese Imperialism. Duke University Press. ISBN 0-8223-6490-5.
- Fukagawa, Hideki (1981). (陸海軍将官人事総覧 (陸軍篇)) Army and Navy General Personnel Directory (Army). Tokyo: Fuyo Shobo. ISBN 4829500026.
- Dupuy, Trevor N. (1992). Encyclopedia of Military Biography. I B Tauris & Co Ltd. ISBN 1-85043-569-3.
- Hata, Ikuhiko (2005). (日本陸海軍総合事典) Japanese Army and Navy General Encyclopedia. Tokyo: St. Martin's Press. ISBN 4130301357.
