= Governor-General of Taiwan =

Representative of the emperor of Japan in the colony

- 臺灣總督
- Seal of the governor-general

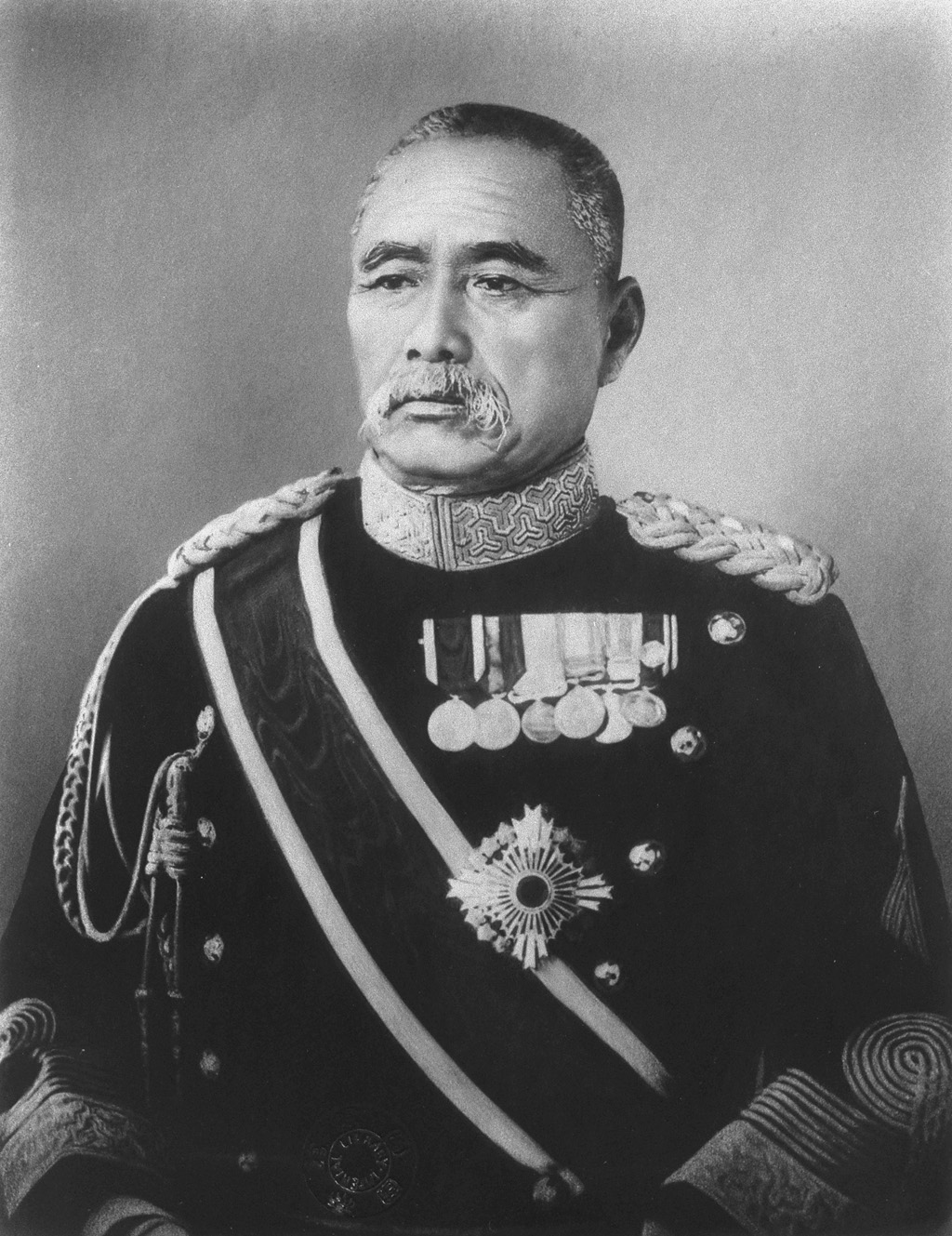
- Longest serving Sakuma Samata; 11 April 1906 – 1 May 1915
- Government-General of Taiwan
- Reports to: Prime Minister of Japan
- Residence: Official residence of the Governor-General of Taiwan
- Seat: Office of the Governor-General of Taiwan, Taihoku, Taiwan
- Appointer: Emperor of Japan
- Precursor: President of Formosa
- Formation: 10 May 1895
- First holder: Kabayama Sukenori
- Final holder: Rikichi Andō
- Abolished: 25 October 1945
- Superseded by: Governor of Taiwan Province

The governor-general of Taiwan (Japanese: 臺灣總督, romanized: Taiwan Sōtoku, shinjitai: 台湾総督) was the head of the Government-General of Taiwan in the Japanese era (including Formosa and the Pescadores) when they were part of the Empire of Japan, from 1895 to 1945.

The Japanese governors-general were members of the Diet, civilian officials, Japanese nobles or generals. They exercised their power on behalf of the sovereign of Taiwan (the emperor of Japan) until the dissolution of the empire when the dominion came under administration of the Republic of China and was renounced by Japan.

== Governors-general of Taiwan, 1895–1945 ==
Military Rikken Seiyūkai Kenseikai Rikken Minseitō

Governors-General of Taiwan (1895–1945)
No.	Portrait	Name	Origin prefecture	Occupation	Affiliation	Term of office		Emperor of Japan
1		Kabayama Sukenori 樺山資紀	Kagoshima	Admiral (Imperial Japanese Navy) (Viscount)	Military	10 May 1895	2 June 1896	Meiji
2		Katsura Tarō 桂太郎	Yamaguchi	Lieutenant General (Imperial Japanese Army) (Viscount)	Military	2 June 1896	14 October 1896	Meiji
3		Nogi Maresuke 乃木希典	Yamaguchi	Lieutenant General (Imperial Japanese Army) (Baron)	Military	14 October 1896	26 February 1898	Meiji
4		Kodama Gentarō 兒玉源太郎	Yamaguchi	Lieutenant General (Imperial Japanese Army) (Baron)	Military	26 February 1898	11 April 1906	Meiji
5		Sakuma Samata 佐久間左馬太	Yamaguchi	General (Imperial Japanese Army) (Viscount)	Military	11 April 1906	1 May 1915	Meiji
5		Sakuma Samata 佐久間左馬太	Yamaguchi	General (Imperial Japanese Army) (Viscount)	Military	11 April 1906	1 May 1915	Taishō
6		Andō Teibi 安東貞美	Nagano	General (Imperial Japanese Army) (Baron)	Military	1 May 1915	6 June 1918	Taishō
7		Akashi Motojiro 明石元二郎	Fukuoka	Lieutenant General (Imperial Japanese Army)	Military	6 June 1918	24 October 1919	Taishō
8		Den Kenjirō 田健治郎	Hyōgo	Member of Terauchi Cabinet (Baron)	Seiyūkai	29 October 1919	6 September 1923	Taishō
9		Uchida Kakichi 內田嘉吉	Tokyo	Member of House of Peers	Seiyūkai	6 September 1923	1 September 1924	Taishō
10		Izawa Takio 伊澤多喜男	Nagano	Member of House of Peers	Kenseikai	1 September 1924	16 July 1926	Taishō
11		Kamiyama Mitsunoshin 上山滿之進	Yamaguchi	literary figure	Kenseikai	16 July 1926	16 June 1928	Taishō
11		Kamiyama Mitsunoshin 上山滿之進	Yamaguchi	literary figure	Kenseikai	16 July 1926	16 June 1928	Shōwa
12		Kawamura Takeji 川村竹治	Akita	Member of House of Peers	Seiyūkai	16 June 1928	30 July 1929	Shōwa
13		Ishizuka Eizō 石塚英藏	Fukushima	Member of House of Peers	Minseitō	30 July 1929	16 January 1931	Shōwa
14		Ōta Masahiro 太田政弘	Yamagata	Director of Kwantung Leased Territory	Minseitō	16 January 1931	2 March 1932	Shōwa
15		Minami Hiroshi 南弘	Toyama	Member of House of Peers	Seiyūkai	2 March 1932	26 May 1932	Shōwa
16		Nakagawa Kenzō 中川健蔵	Niigata	Undersecretary of Education	Minseitō	26 May 1932	2 September 1936	Shōwa
17		Kobayashi Seizō 小林躋造	Hiroshima	Admiral (Imperial Japanese Navy)	Military	2 September 1936	27 November 1940	Shōwa
18		Hasegawa Kiyoshi 長谷川清	Fukui	Admiral (Imperial Japanese Navy)	Military	27 November 1940	30 December 1944	Shōwa
19		Andō Rikichi 安藤利吉	Miyagi	General (Imperial Japanese Army)	Military	30 December 1944	25 October 1945	Shōwa

== See also ==
- Governor of Formosa
- Governor of Taiwan Province
- Japanese Governor-General of Korea
  - List of Japanese governors-general of Korea
- History of Taiwan
- Japanese Resident-General of Korea
  - List of Japanese residents-general of Korea
- List of rulers of Taiwan
- Political divisions of Taiwan (1895–1945)
- Railway Department of the Office of the Governor-General of Taiwan
- Taiwan after World War II
- Timeline of Taiwanese history
