= Fuyuan railway station =

Fuyuan railway station may refer to:

- Fuyuan railway station (China) (抚远站), a station located in Fuyuan, Heilongjiang, China
- Fuyuan railway station (Taiwan) (富源車站), a station located in Ruisui, Hualien, Taiwan
- Fuyuan North railway station (富源北站), a station located in Fuyuan County, Yunnan, China
