= Ruisui Tropic of Cancer Marker =

Monument in Ruisui, Hualien County, Taiwan

- 北回歸線標誌塔
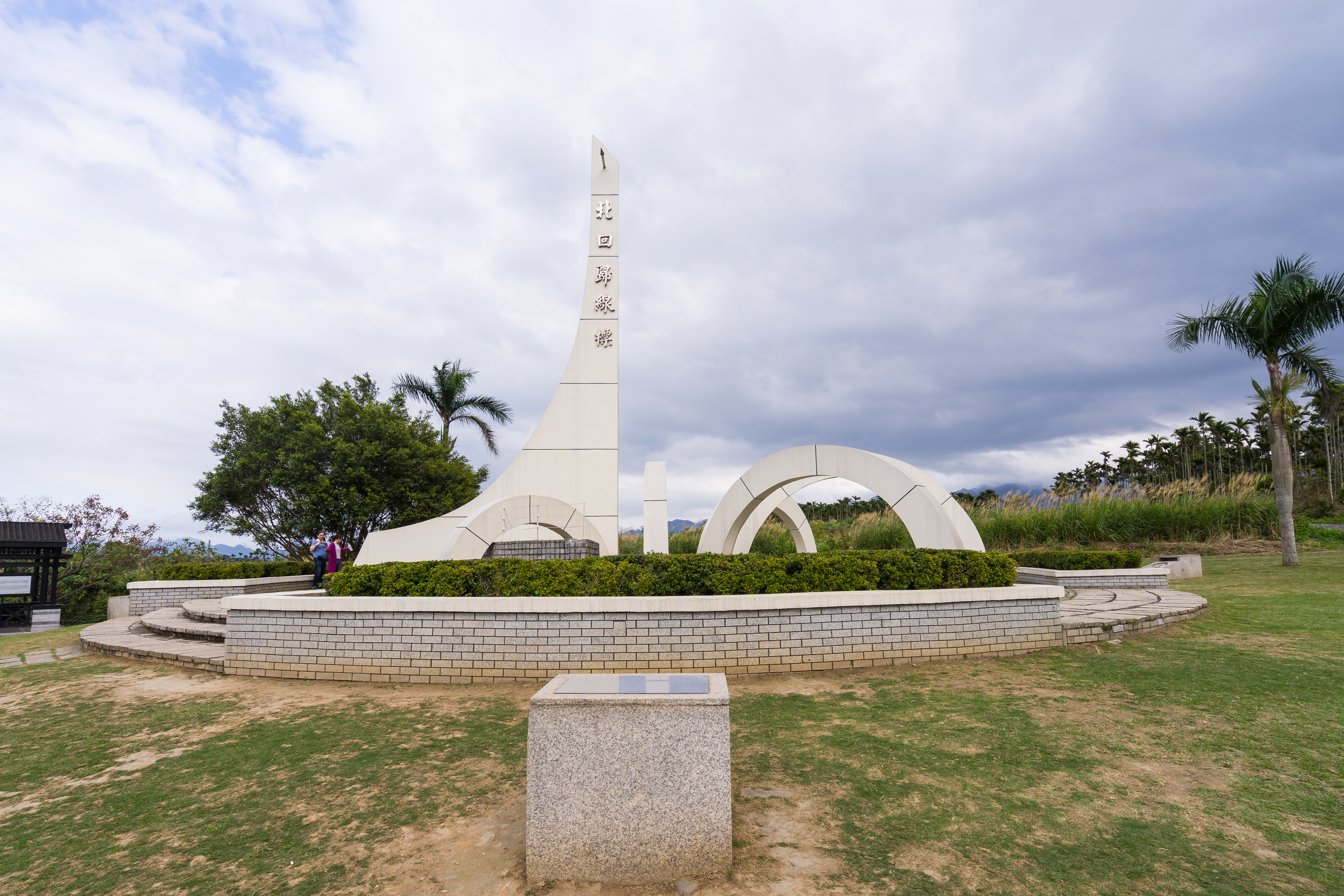
- Interactive map of Ruisui Tropic of Cancer Marker
- Location: Ruisui, Hualien County, Taiwan
- Coordinates: 23°27′55.8″N 121°21′28.2″E
- Type: Tropic of Cancer monument
- Opening date: 1933

The Ruisui Tropic of Cancer Marker (traditional Chinese: 北回歸線標誌塔; simplified Chinese: 北回归线标志塔; pinyin: Běi Huíguīxiàn Biāozhì Tǎ) is a monument marking the Tropic of Cancer in Ruisui Township, Hualien County, Taiwan.

== History ==
The monument was originally constructed in 1933 west of Ruisui Railway Station. Due to the Hualien–Taitung line tracks replacement work carried out in 1981, the monument had to be relocated to Wuhe Terrace and placed along the Provincial Highway 9.

== Geology ==
At noon on 22 June every year, the monument shows no shadow due to the position of the sun exactly above it.

== Transportation ==
The monument is accessible within walking distance south of Ruisui Station of Taiwan Railway.

== See also ==
- Tropic of Cancer Science Park, India
- Geography of Taiwan
