= Anisocnemus =

Scientific classification
- Kingdom: Animalia
- Phylum: Arthropoda
- Class: Insecta
- Order: Coleoptera
- Suborder: Adephaga
- Family: Carabidae
- Subfamily: Harpalinae
- Genus: Anisocnemus; Chaudoir, 1843

Genus of beetles

Anisocnemus is a genus of beetles in the family Carabidae found from the Tropic of Cancer on the Pacific coast southward through Central America, Colombia and Venezuela. Adults are burrowers and disperse by flight. The genus contains the following species:

- Anisocnemus amblygonus Shpeley & Ball, 1978
- Anisocnemus validu Chaudoir, 1843
