= Ruisui railway station =

Railway station in Ruisui, Hualien County, Taiwan

Ruisui 瑞穗車站
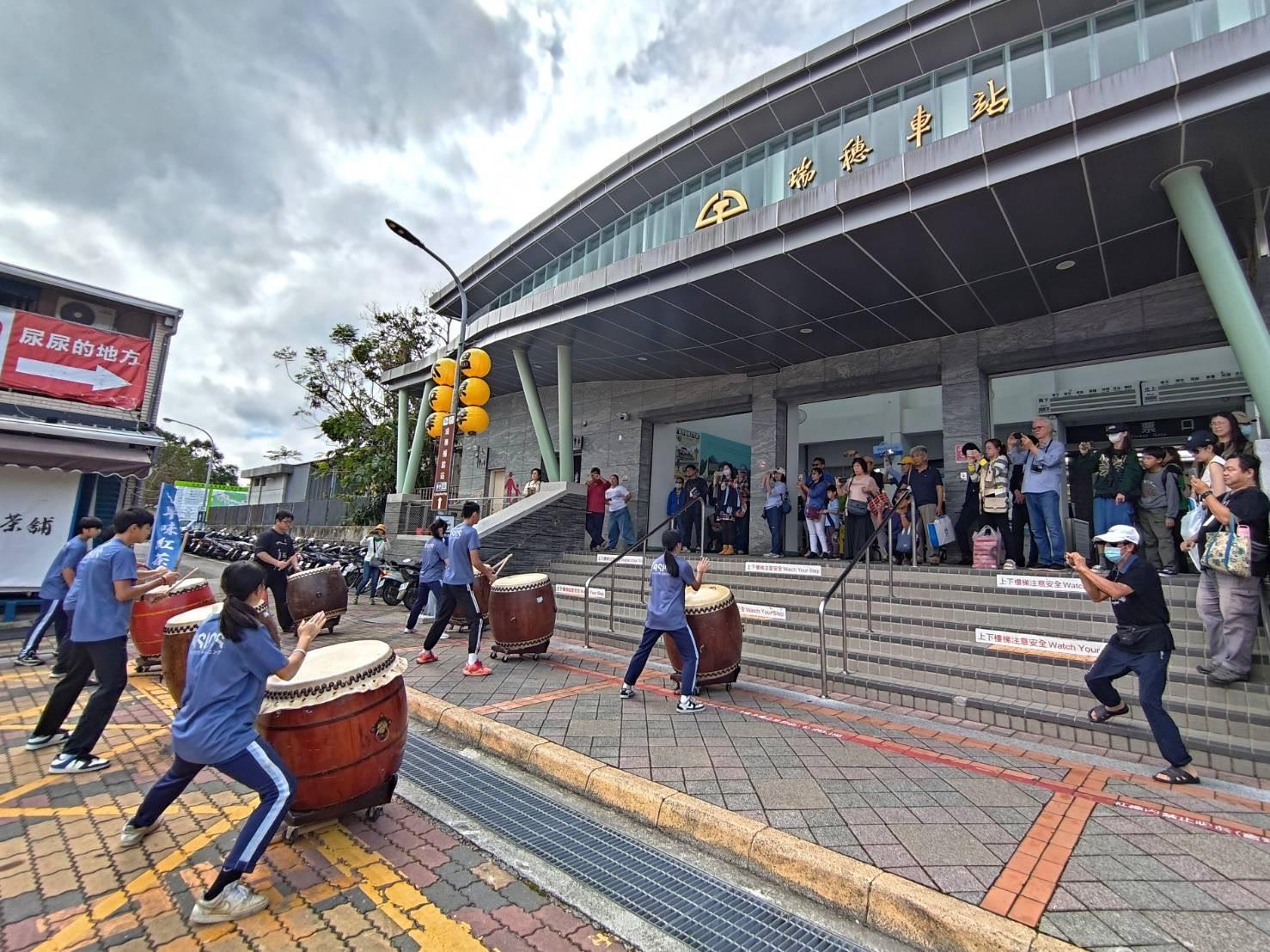

General information
- Location: Ruisui, Hualien County, Taiwan
- Coordinates: 23°29′50.6″N 121°22′36.6″E
- System: Train station
- Owner: Taiwan Railway Corporation
- Operator: Taiwan Railway Corporation
- Line: Taitung
- Train operators: Taiwan Railway Corporation

History
- Opened: 26 January 1915

Passengers
- 1,264 daily (2024)

Services
Preceding station	Taiwan Railway	Following station
Fuyuan towards Badu	Eastern Trunk line	Sanmin towards Taitung
Location

Ruisui (traditional Chinese: 瑞穗車站; simplified Chinese: 瑞穗车站; pinyin: Ruìsuì Chēzhàn) is a railway station on Taiwan Railway Taitung line located in Ruisui Township, Hualien County, Taiwan.

== History ==
The station was opened on 26 January 1915.

== Around the station ==
- Rareseed Ranch
- Ruisui Tropic of Cancer Marker
- Saoba Stone Pillars

== See also ==
- List of railway stations in Taiwan
