= Fuyuan railway station (China) =

Railway station in Fuyuan, Heilongjiang, China

Fuyuan 抚远
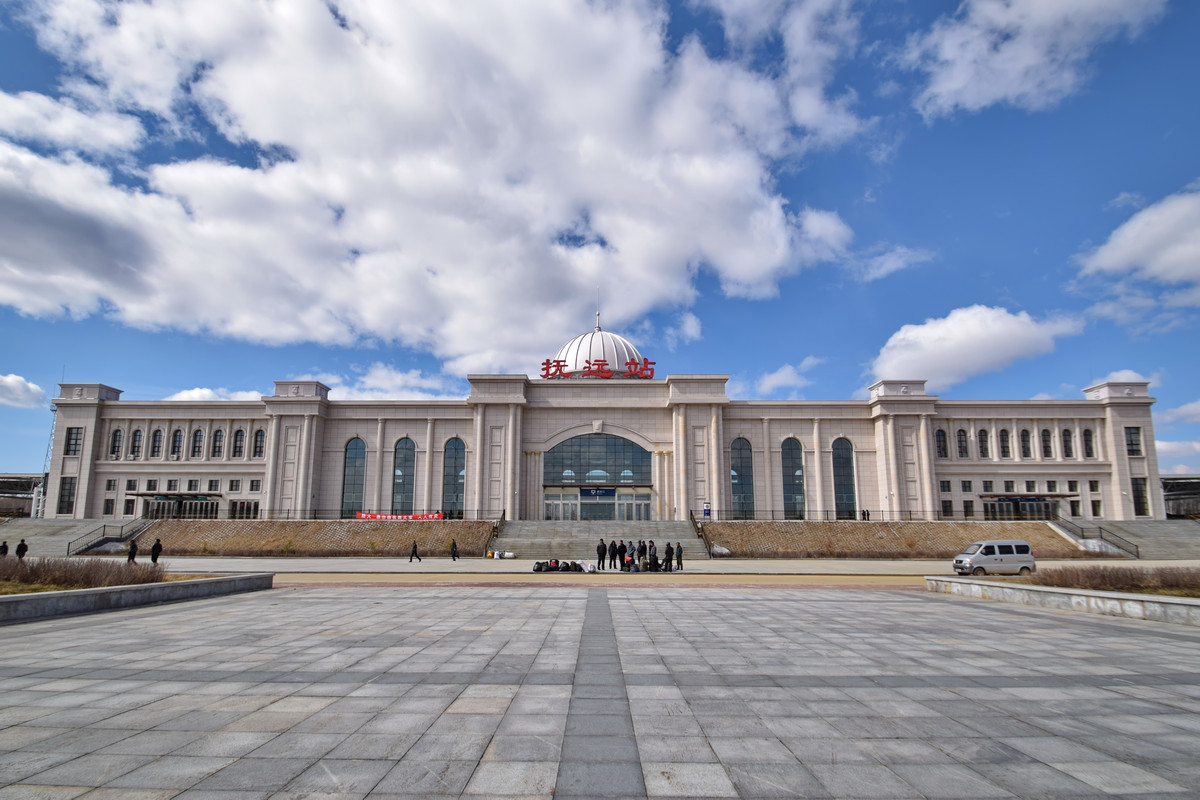
- Station building (2014)

General information
- Location: Fuyuan, Heilongjiang; China
- Coordinates: 48.343289°N 134.393890°E
- Operator: China Railway Harbin Group
- Line: Qianfu railway
- Platforms: 2
- Tracks: 4

Other information
- Station code: FYB (Pinyin: FYU)

History
- Opened: December 18, 2012; 13 years ago
Location
- Location within China

Fuyuan railway station (Chinese: 抚远站) is the eastern terminal station of the Qianfu railway. Located in Fuyuan, Heilongjiang, it is the eastern most passenger railway station in China.

== Services ==
The station serves both passengers and freight usages. Passenger services head towards Qianjin and Harbin.

== History ==
The station was constructed as part of a railway expansion project from Qianjin in an effort to improve China–Russia relations.

The station began construction on October 2010, with freight operations beginning on December 6 2011 and passenger operations beginning on December 18, 2012.

The station was renovated in June 2025 to help improve tourism experiences in the region.

== Passenger statistics ==
As of 2023, the station served 99,000 passengers and approximately 125,000 tons of freight.
