= Rareseed Ranch =

Ranch in Ruisui, Hualien County, Taiwan

Rareseed Ranch 瑞穗牧場
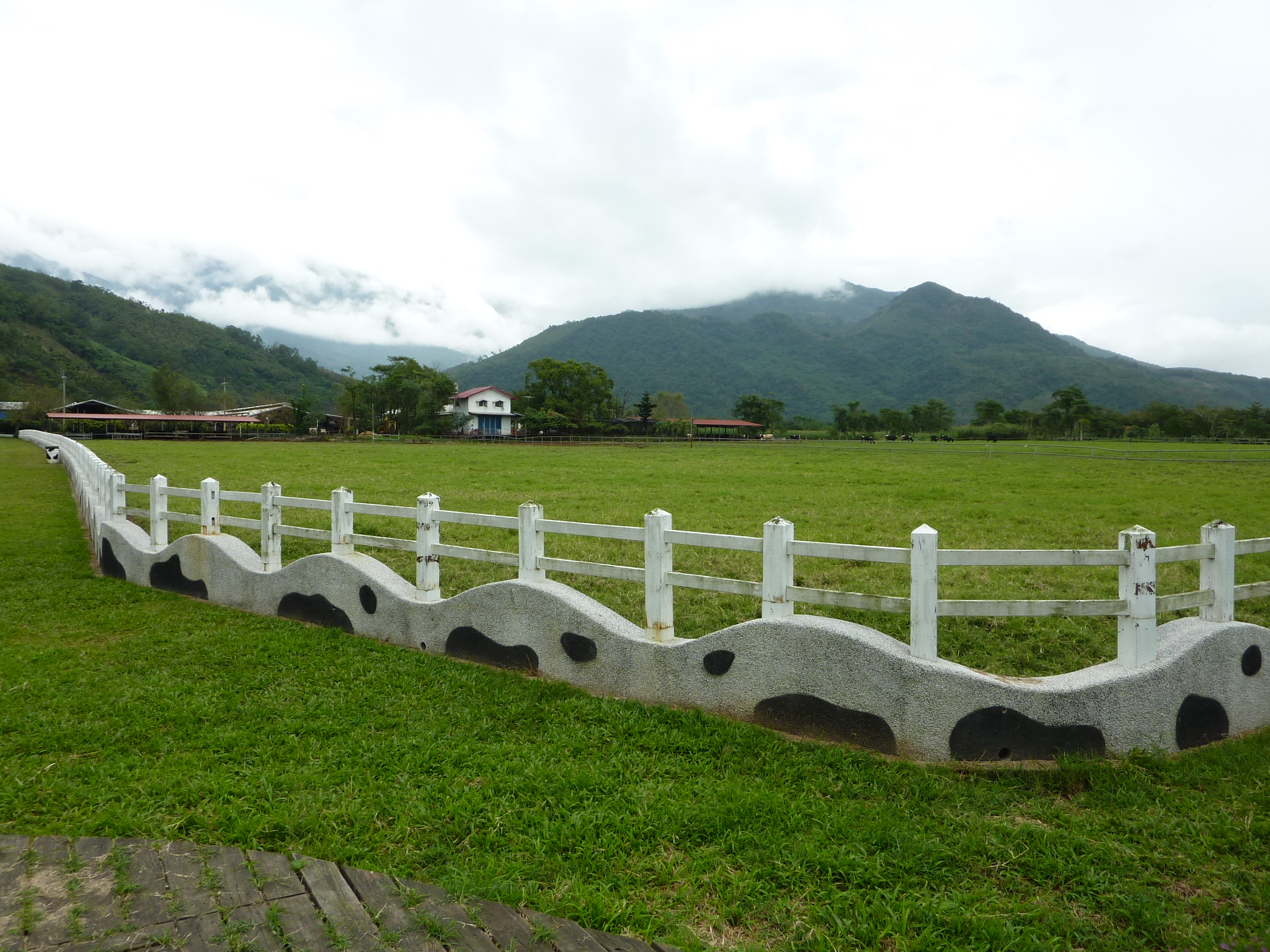
- Town/City: Ruisui, Hualien County, Taiwan
- Coordinates: 23°28′49.7″N 121°20′42.4″E

The Rareseed Ranch or Ruisui Ranch (traditional Chinese: 瑞穗牧場; simplified Chinese: 瑞穗牧场; pinyin: Ruìsuì Mùchǎng) is a tourist attraction ranch in Wuhe Village, Ruisui Township, Hualien County, Taiwan.

== History ==
The ranch was originally a papaya farm in 1969. It was then later transformed into a ranch. Milk produced by cows in the ranch is distributed around Taiwan by Uni-President Enterprises Corporation.

== Geology ==
The ranch land is very fertile due to the fresh water supply from the Central Mountain Range.

== Architecture ==
The ranch consists of dining area and outdoor café.

== Transportation ==
The ranch is accessible southwest from Ruisui Station of the Taiwan Railway.

== See also ==
- List of tourist attractions in Taiwan
