= Fuyuan railway station (Taiwan) =

Railway station located in Hualien, Taiwan

Fuyuan Station 富源車站
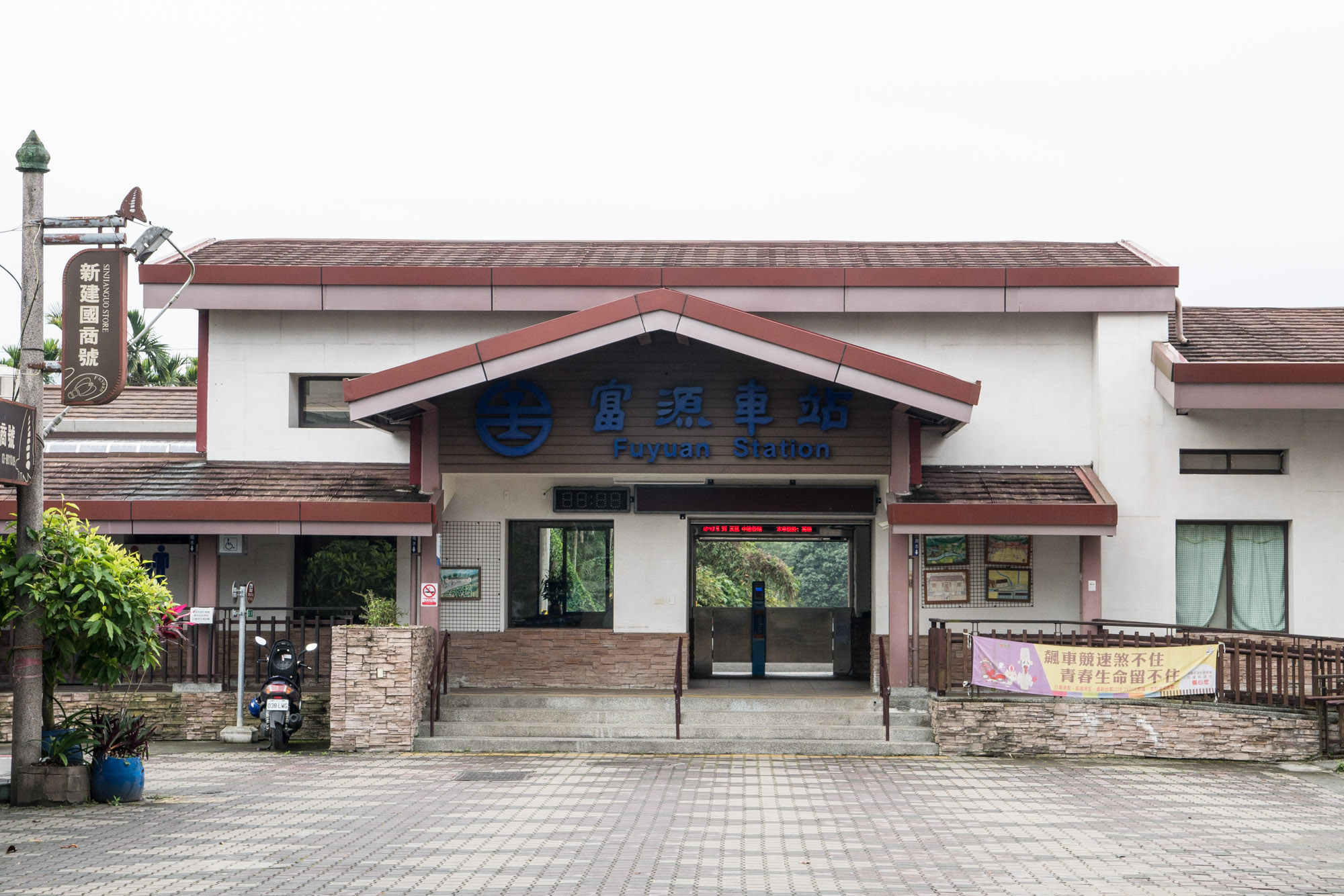

Chinese name
- Traditional Chinese: 富源車站
Transcriptions
Standard Mandarin
- Hanyu Pinyin: Fùyuán Chēzhàn
- Bopomofo: ㄈㄨˋ ㄩㄢˊ ㄔㄜ ㄓㄢˋ

General information
- Location: Ruisui, Hualien; Taiwan
- Coordinates: 23°34′48.9″N 121°22′48.4″E
- System: Taiwan Railway railway station
- Line: Taitung line
- Distance: 53.6 km to Hualien
- Platforms: 1 island platform 1 side platform

Construction
- Structure type: At-grade

Other information
- Station code: 031

History
- Opened: 8 March 1914

Passengers
- 2017: 19,077 per year
- Rank: 90

Services
Preceding station	Taiwan Railway	Following station
Dafu towards Badu	Eastern Trunk line	Ruisui towards Taitung
Location

Fuyuan railway station (Chinese: 富源車站; pinyin: Fùyuán Chēzhàn) is a railway station located in Ruisui Township, Hualien County, Taiwan. It is located on the Taitung line and is operated by the Taiwan Railway.

== Surrounding area ==
- Fuyuan National Forest Recreation Area
