= Jiamusi =

Jiamusi 佳木斯市 Chia-mu-ssu, Kiamusze
- Prefecture-level city
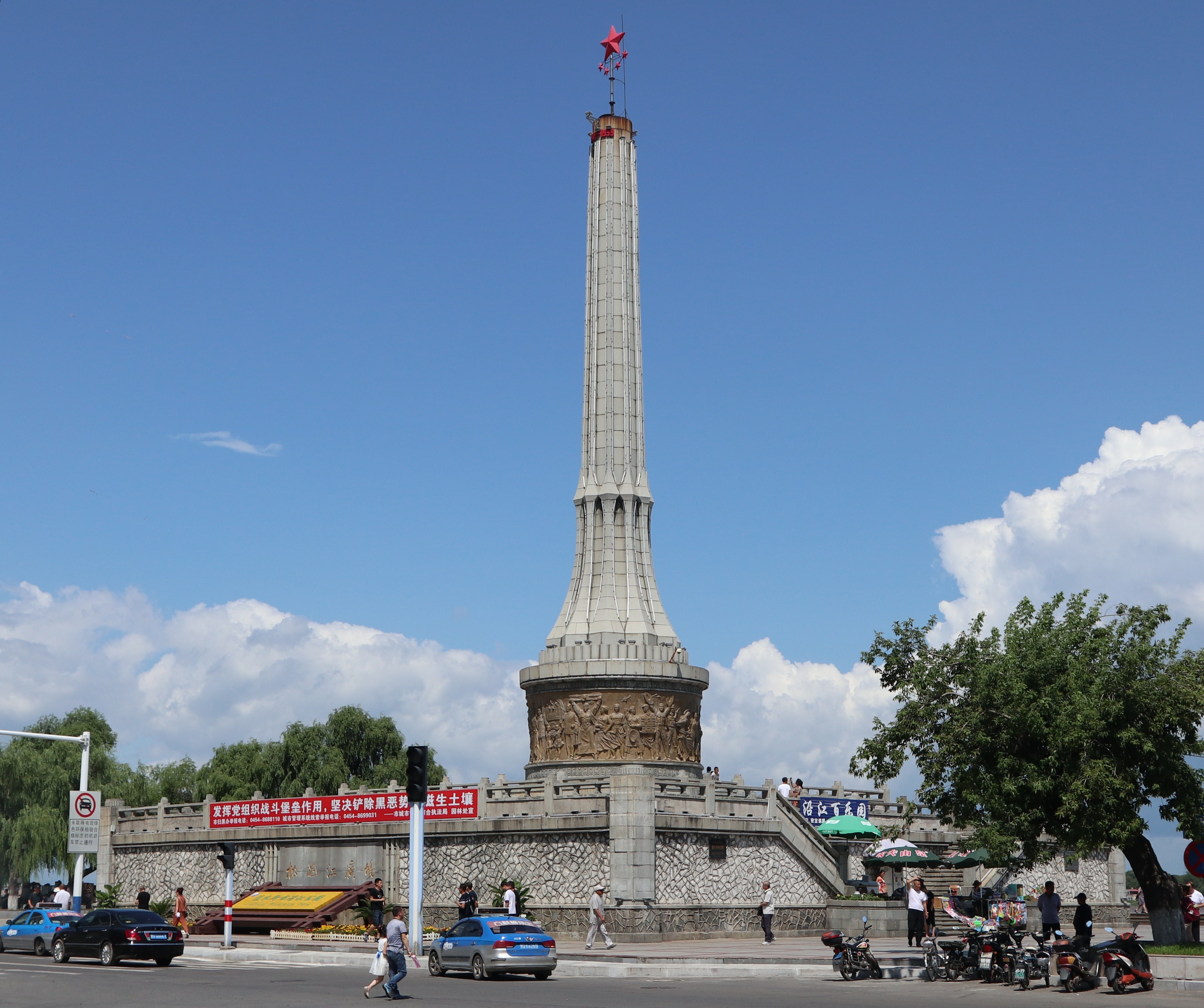
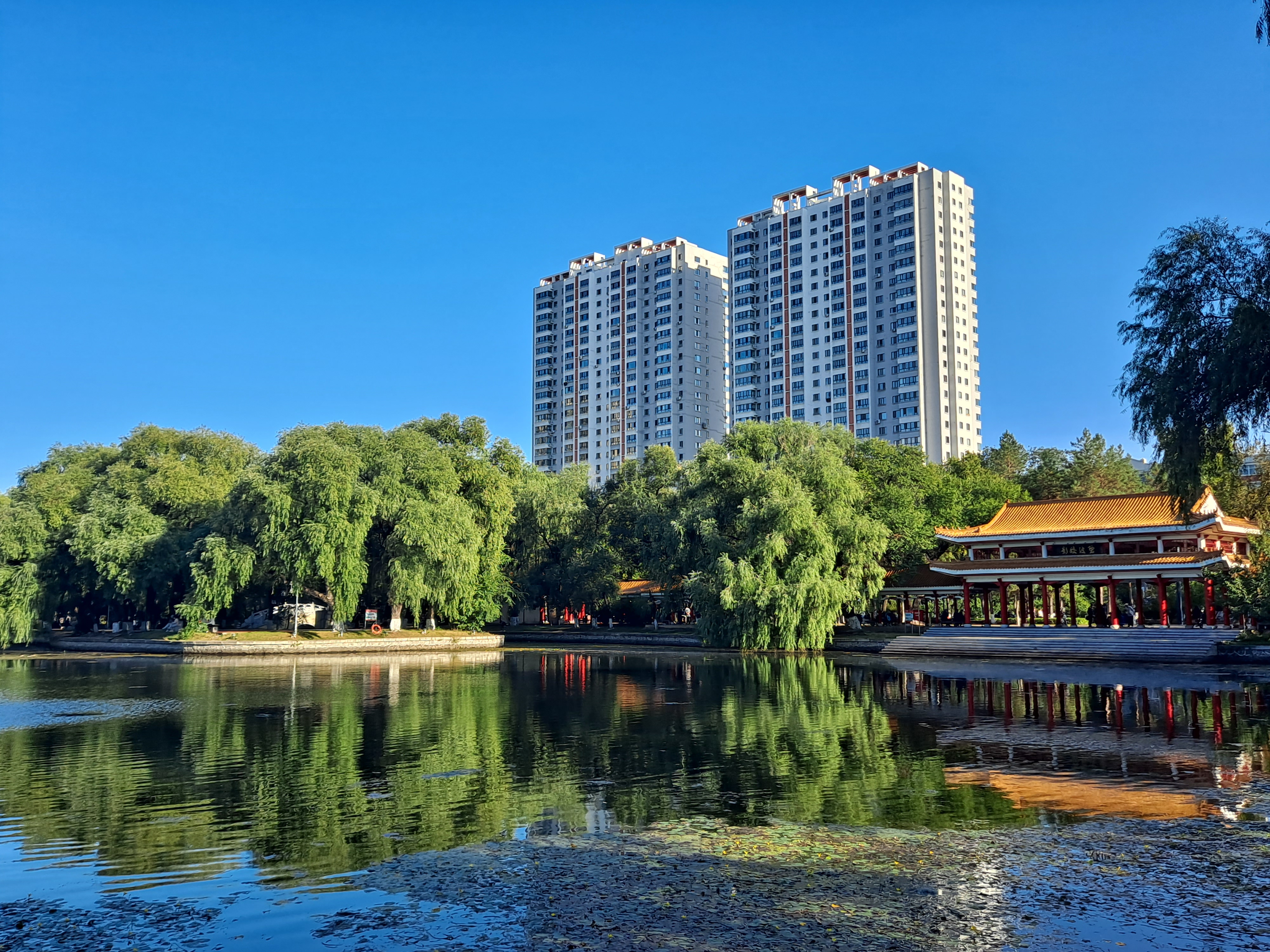
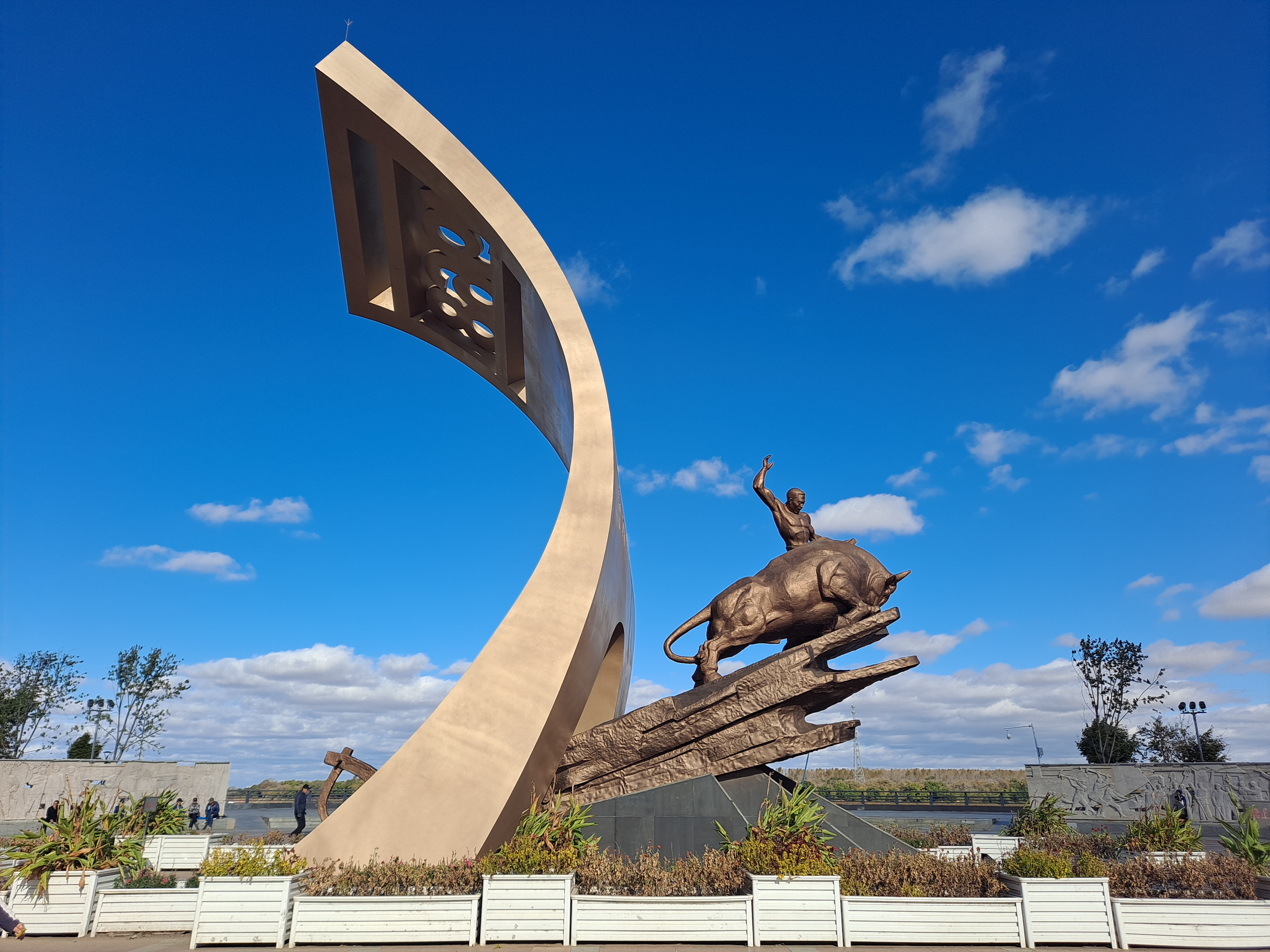
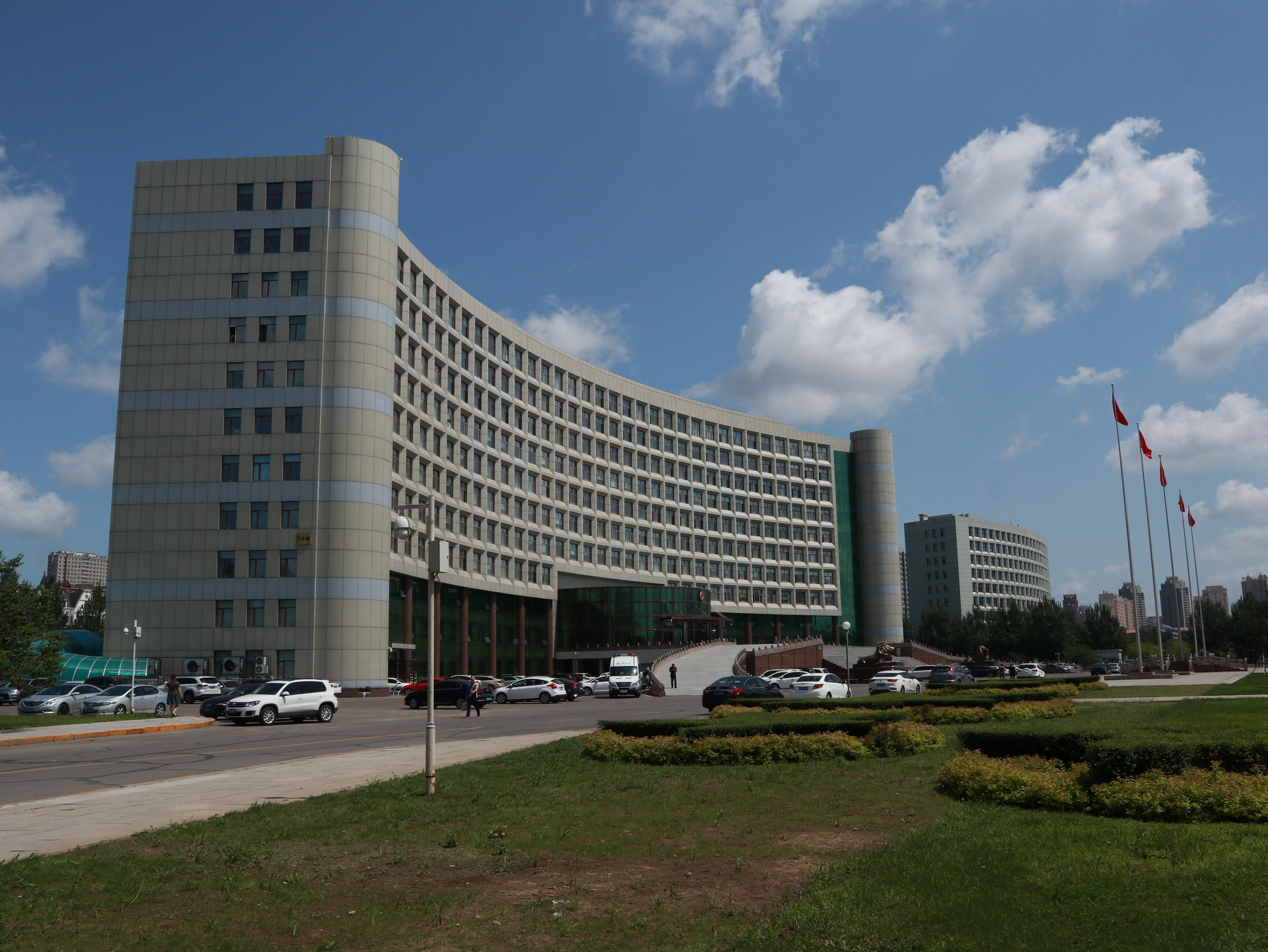
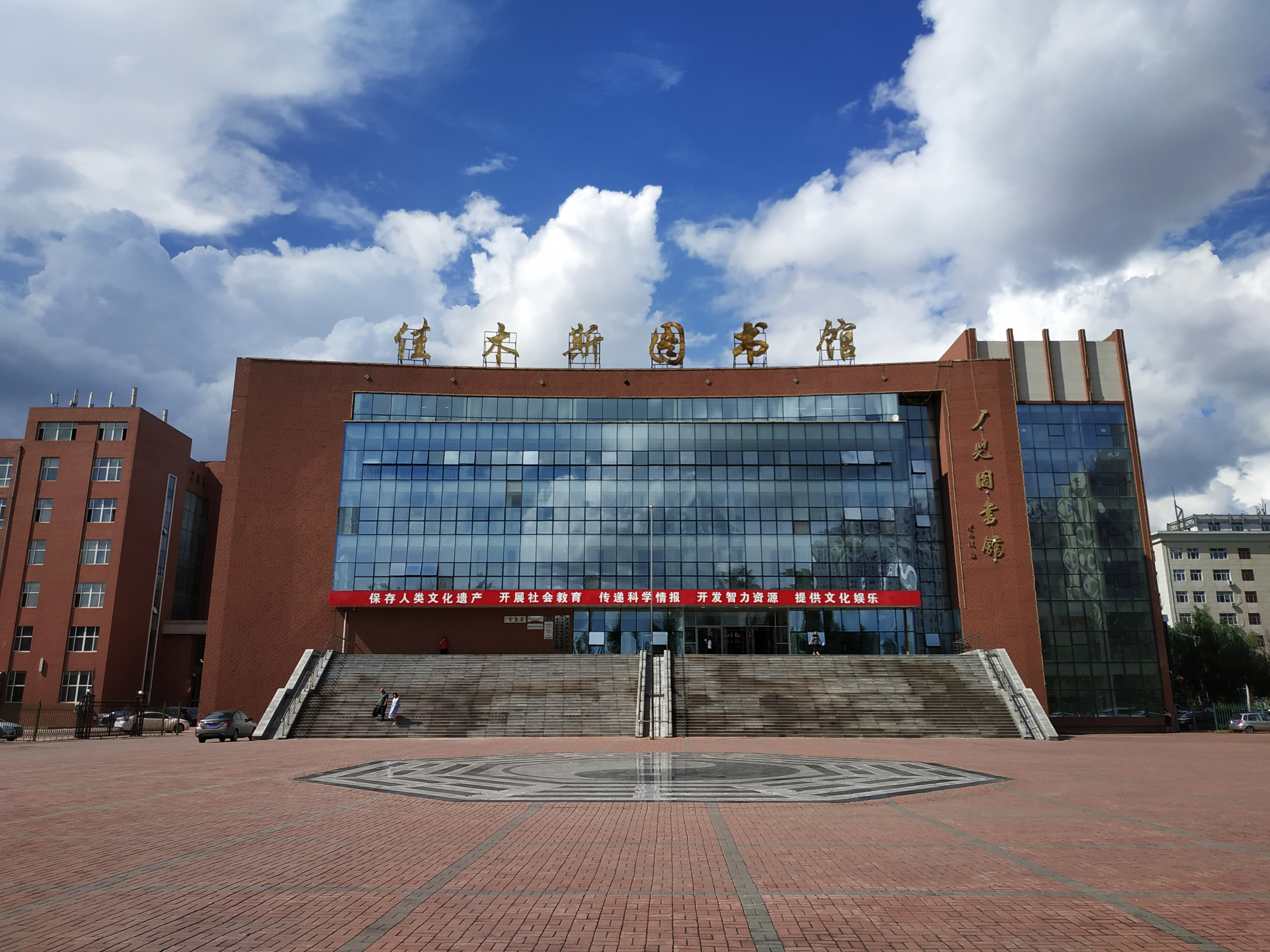
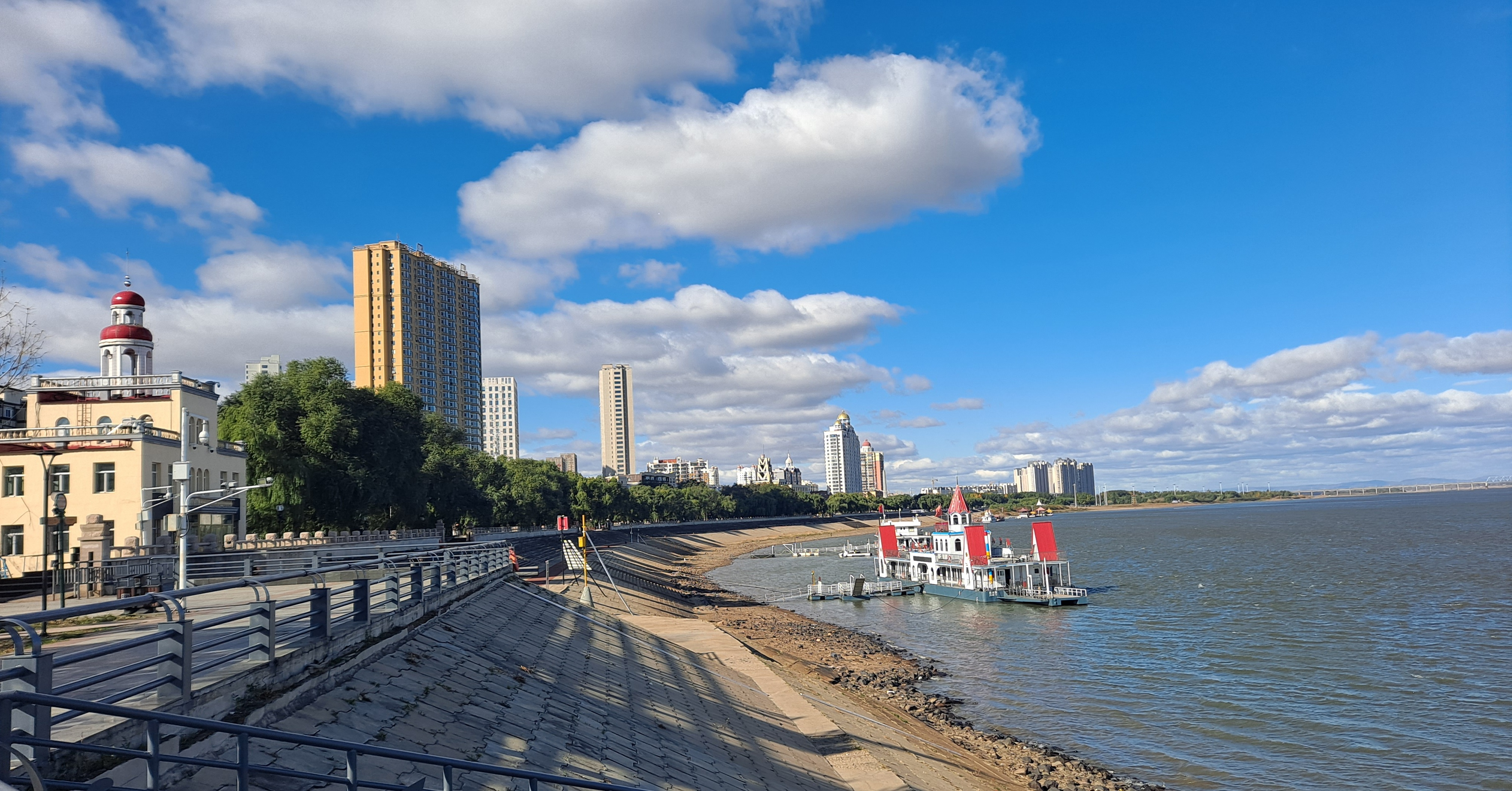

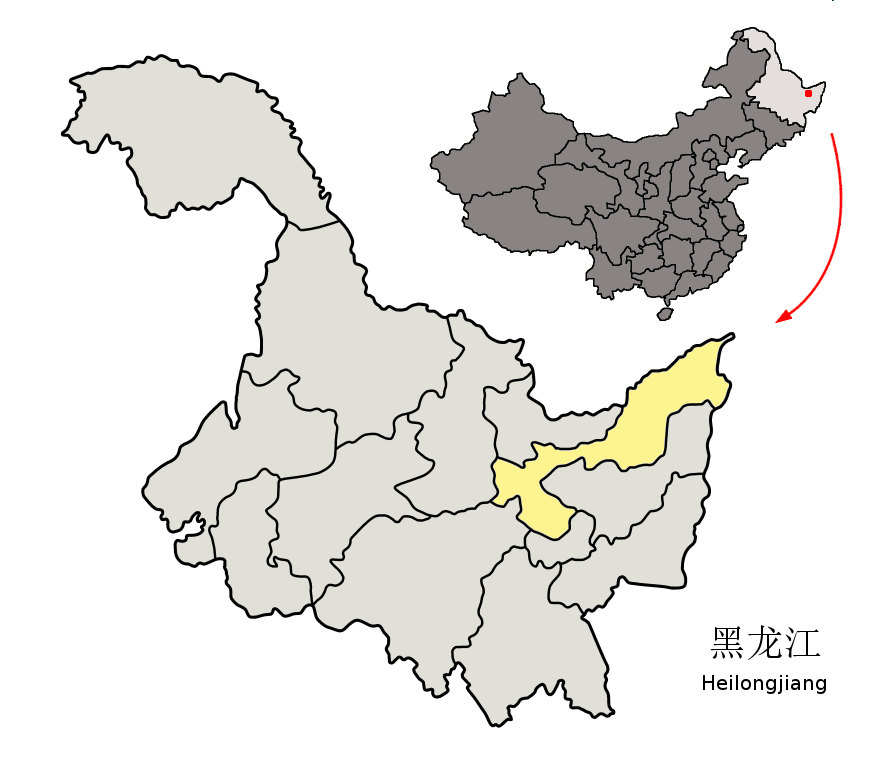
- Location of Jiamusi City (yellow) in Heilongjiang (light grey)

- Location of the city centre in Heilongjiang
- Coordinates (Jiamusi government): 46°48′00″N 130°19′08″E
- Country: People's Republic of China
- Province: Heilongjiang
- County-level divisions: 10
- Municipal seat: Qianjin District

Government
  - Type: Prefecture-level city
  - Mayor: Shao Guoqiang (邵国强)
  - Municipal Committee Secretary: Xu Jianguo (徐建国)

Area
  - Prefecture-level city: 31,528 km^{2} (12,173 sq mi)
  - Urban: 882.5 km^{2} (340.7 sq mi)
  - Metro: 882.5 km^{2} (340.7 sq mi)
- Elevation: 83 m (272 ft)

Population (2020 census)
  - Prefecture-level city: 2,156,505
  - Density: 68.400/km^{2} (177.15/sq mi)
  - Urban: 862,555
  - Urban density: 977.4/km^{2} (2,531/sq mi)
  - Metro: 862,555
  - Metro density: 977.4/km^{2} (2,531/sq mi)

GDP
  - Prefecture-level city: CN¥ 86.1 billion US$ 13.8 billion
  - Per capita: CN¥ 35,944; US$ 5,771
- Time zone: UTC+8 (China Standard)
- Postal code: 154000
- Area code: 0454
- ISO 3166 code: CN-HL-08
- Licence plates: 黑D
- Climate: Dwa
- Website: www.jms.gov.cn

Jiamusi
- "Jiamusi", as written in Chinese

Chinese name
- Chinese: 佳木斯
- Postal: Kiamusze
Transcriptions
Standard Mandarin
- Hanyu Pinyin: Jiāmùsī

Manchu name
- Manchu script: ᡤᡳᠶᠠᠮᡠᠰᡳ
- Romanization: Giyamusi

Russian name
- Russian: Цзямусы

Jiamusi (Manchu: ᡤᡳᠶᠠᠮᡠᠰᡳ Chinese: 佳木斯; pinyin: Jiāmùsī [ˌtɕiá.mû.sí]; Russian: Цзямусы; formerly Kiamusze) is a prefecture-level city in eastern Heilongjiang province, People's Republic of China. Located along the middle and lower reaches of the Songhua River, it faces Russia's Khabarovsk Krai across the Ussuri River and the Heilongjiang. In 2018, Jiamusi had a GDP of RMB 101.2 billion with a 4.3% growth rate. Its population was 2,156,505 at the 2020 census of whom 862,555 lived in the built-up area comprising 4 urban districts. At the end of 2024, the total registered population of the city was 2.213 million, a decrease of 22,000 from the previous year. Among them, the urban population is 1.145 million, and the urbanization rate of the registered population is 51.7%.

== History ==
=== Early history ===
In 1720, Jiamusi was first named Giyamusi (ᡤᡳᠶᠠᠮᡠᠰᡳ, 甲母克寺噶珊，嘉木寺) during the Kangxi period by the Nanai people. The word Giyamusi originally means "inn" in the Manchu language. Because of the harsh climate and short growing season, the region of modern-day Jiamusi was largely uncultivated.

Since the Qing government opened Manchuria for farming in order to prevent the conquest of the area by Russia, Jiamusi developed as a small trading post under the name Dongxing (東興鎮) since 1888. When Han Chinese and Manchu settlers began to move into the area, Jiamusi became the seat of a county administration, under the name Huachuan in 1910. However, the county seat was moved 30 miles to the north to Haoli (Hegang) after several destructive floods. After the Xinhai Revolution, as the Han Chinese continued to move in, the population of Jiamusi rose rapidly. Jiamusi continued to grow as a commercial center. As Jiamusi has become the largest harbor along the lower reaches of the Songhua River, a road system was constructed in order to provide convenient transport linking Jiamusi to several other important strongholds in northeastern China including Harbin and Nancha.

=== Japanese occupation period ===
As the Japanese invasion of Manchuria began, Jiamusi was established as an administrative centre of the puppet Manchukuo government. Going by the name Kiamusze, Jiamusi was also the capital of Sanjiang province. Jiamusi was regarded as an important military strongpoint to defend the Soviet Red Army's possible invasion. In 1937, the City of Jiamusi was established. It also became a major military base. Many settlers came into the area, not only from China but also from Korea and Japan, including the Development Group of Manchuria and Mongolia. After the construction of and Tumen-Jiamusi and Suihua-Jiamusi Railway continuously completed in 1937 and 1940, Jiamusi has become an agricultural products distribution center in Heilongjiang.

=== People's Republic ===
After 1949, as Jiamusi was still the transport and communications center of this region, the rapid development of Jiamusi continued. Industries including manufacturing agricultural equipment, mining machinery, fertilizers, plastics, and chemicals were developed. Since one of the biggest paper mills in China was built in 1957, Jiamusi has been a major producer of wood pulp and newsprint. Because of being conveniently connected by air and water to Khabarovsk in the Russian Far East, Jiamusi is also an important harbour for international trade in northeastern China.

== Geography ==
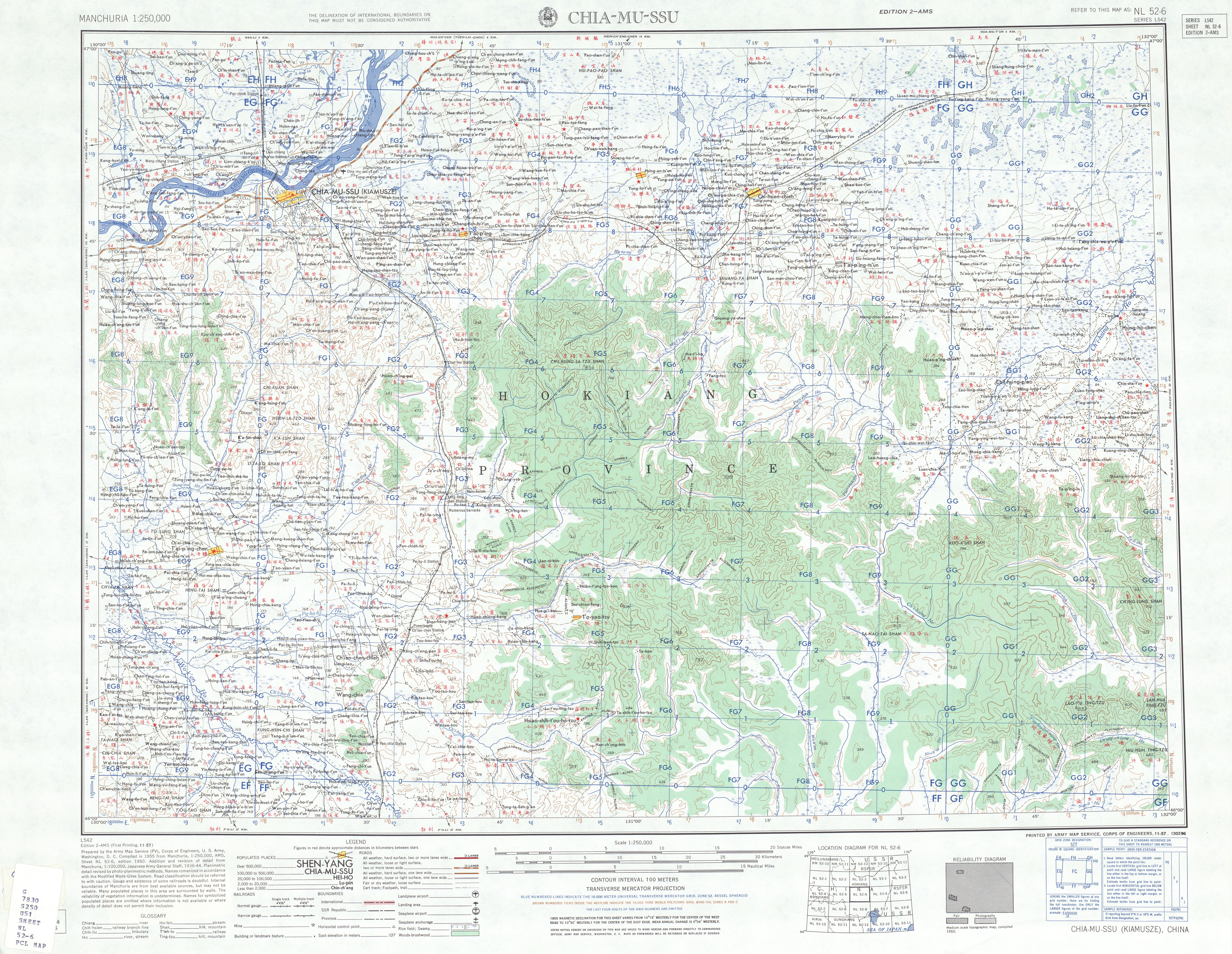
Map including Jiamusi (labeled as 佳木斯 CHIA-MU-SSU (KIAMUSZE)) (AMS, 1955)

Jiamusi is located in eastern Heilongjiang province. Located at latitude 45° 56′−48° 28′ N and longitude 129° 29′−135° 05' E, containing China' easternmost point, although the urban area of Shuangyashan lies further to the east of Jiamusi. Neighbouring prefectures are:

- Harbin (W)
- Hegang (N)
- Qitaihe (S)
- Shuangyashan (E)
- Yichun (W)

It also borders Russia's Khabarovsk Krai to the east. The average elevation in the prefecture is 85 metres (279 ft), with the terrain primarily consisting of plains. The total area of the prefecture is 31,258 square kilometres (12,069 sq mi). The confluence of the Amur, Songhua and Ussuri rivers meet in the east of the city. The Sanjiang Plain came into being because of the alluvion of these three large rivers.

=== Climate ===
Jiamusi has a monsoon-influenced humid continental climate (Köppen: Dwa), with long, bitter, but dry winters, and humid and very warm summers. The monthly 24-hour average temperature ranges from −18.0 °C (−0.4 °F) in January to 22.5 °C (72.5 °F) in July, while the annual mean is 4.0 °C (39.2 °F), and more than 60% of the year's precipitation occurs from June to August. The frost-free period is about 130 days per year, while mean annual precipitation is about 542.6 mm (21.36 in). Typically, the ground freezes to a depth of 1.2 m (3 ft 11 in), beginning to freeze in late November and beginning to thaw in late March. Extreme temperatures have ranged from −41.1 °C to 38.1 °C.

Climate data for Jiamusi, elevation 82 m (269 ft), (1991–2020 normals, extremes 1971–2010)
Month	Jan	Feb	Mar	Apr	May	Jun	Jul	Aug	Sep	Oct	Nov	Dec	Year
Record high °C (°F)	1.8 (35.2)	9.8 (49.6)	20.2 (68.4)	30.0 (86.0)	33.5 (92.3)	37.2 (99.0)	38.8 (101.8)	35.8 (96.4)	30.9 (87.6)	26.1 (79.0)	16.4 (61.5)	5.9 (42.6)	38.8 (101.8)
Mean daily maximum °C (°F)	−11.8 (10.8)	−6.4 (20.5)	2.2 (36.0)	13.0 (55.4)	20.8 (69.4)	25.3 (77.5)	27.7 (81.9)	26.0 (78.8)	21.1 (70.0)	11.9 (53.4)	−0.8 (30.6)	−10.6 (12.9)	9.9 (49.8)
Daily mean °C (°F)	−17.9 (−0.2)	−13.0 (8.6)	−3.5 (25.7)	6.8 (44.2)	14.7 (58.5)	19.9 (67.8)	22.8 (73.0)	20.9 (69.6)	14.8 (58.6)	5.9 (42.6)	−5.7 (21.7)	−15.8 (3.6)	4.2 (39.5)
Mean daily minimum °C (°F)	−23.3 (−9.9)	−19.5 (−3.1)	−9.6 (14.7)	0.4 (32.7)	8.3 (46.9)	14.5 (58.1)	18.1 (64.6)	16.1 (61.0)	8.7 (47.7)	0.0 (32.0)	−10.6 (12.9)	−20.5 (−4.9)	−1.4 (29.4)
Record low °C (°F)	−39.5 (−39.1)	−35.2 (−31.4)	−35.2 (−31.4)	−11.9 (10.6)	−6.0 (21.2)	3.8 (38.8)	8.7 (47.7)	5.4 (41.7)	−3.2 (26.2)	−17.0 (1.4)	−28.4 (−19.1)	−34.5 (−30.1)	−39.5 (−39.1)
Average precipitation mm (inches)	6.3 (0.25)	6.0 (0.24)	15.0 (0.59)	25.5 (1.00)	59.9 (2.36)	91.7 (3.61)	118.3 (4.66)	126 (5.0)	67.8 (2.67)	33.3 (1.31)	15.7 (0.62)	11.8 (0.46)	577.3 (22.77)
Average precipitation days (≥ 0.1 mm)	6.0	4.7	6.7	8.2	11.4	12.9	13.3	12.9	10.2	7.4	6.2	7.5	107.4
Average snowy days	9.2	7.1	9.1	3.8	0	0	0	0	0	2.1	8.3	10.6	50.2
Average relative humidity (%)	68	63	58	53	56	69	77	80	72	63	63	68	66
Mean monthly sunshine hours	159.4	189.0	225.2	219.1	237.2	231.9	230.5	221.7	221.1	191.6	159.4	144.1	2,430.2
Percentage possible sunshine	57	65	61	53	51	49	49	51	59	58	57	54	55
Source 1: China Meteorological Administration
Source 2: Weather China

== Subdivisions ==
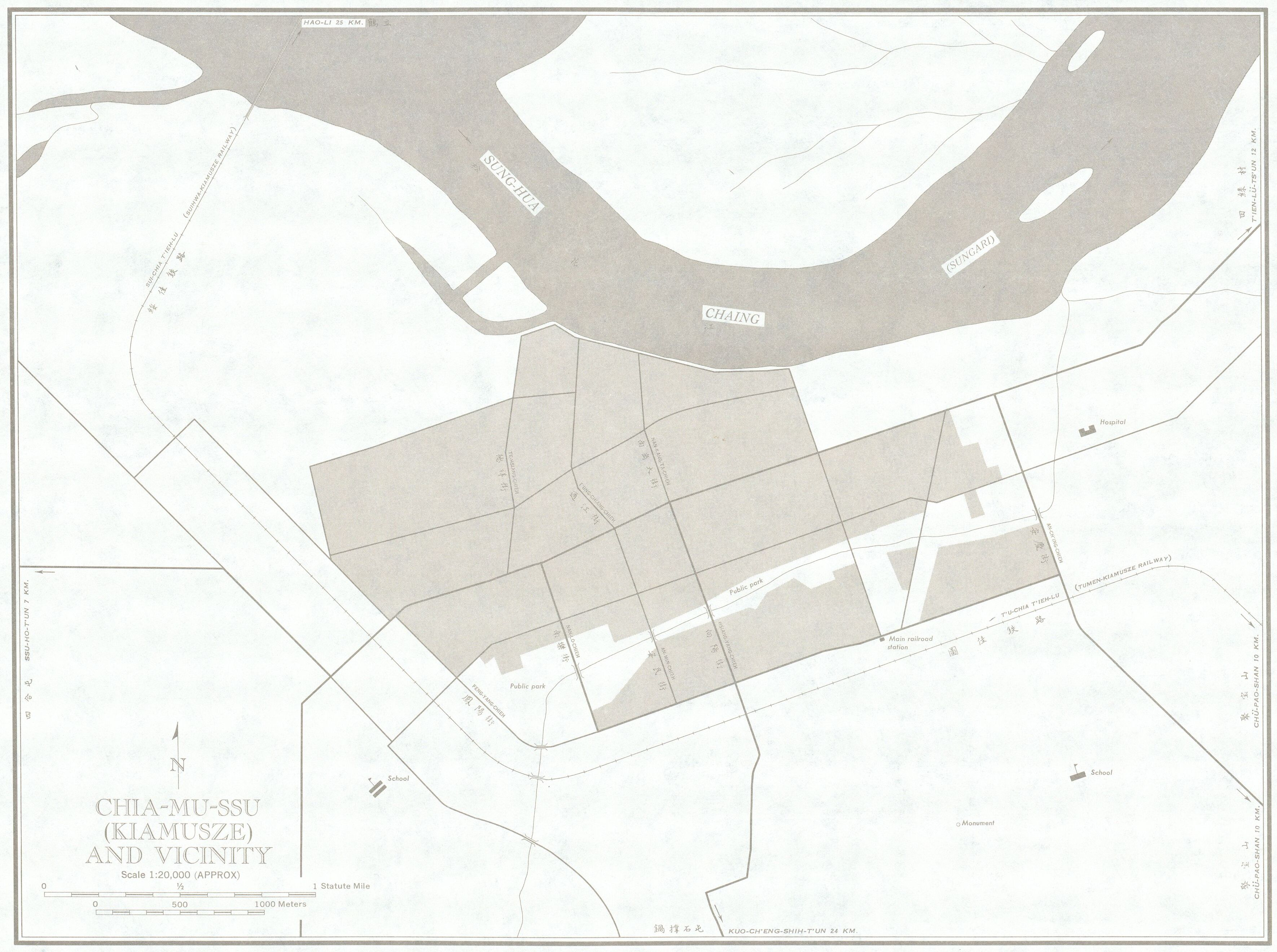
Map of Jiamusi (CHIA-MU-SSU (KIAMUSZE))

On July 26, 2006, Yonghong District (永红区) was merged into Jiao District (郊区).

Map
#	Name	Hanzi	Hanyu Pinyin	Population (2010 est.)	Area (km^{2})	Density (/km^{2})
1	Qianjin District	前进区	Qiánjìn Qū	171,530	14	12,252
2	Xiangyang District	向阳区	Xiàngyáng Qū	233,855	24	9,744
3	Dongfeng District	东风区	Dōngfēng Qū	161,740	53	3,052
4	Jiao District	郊区	Jiāoqū	314,586	792	397
5	Tongjiang City	同江市	Tóngjiāng Shì	179,791	6,252	29
6	Fujin City	富锦市	Fùjǐn Shì	437,165	8,227	53
10	Fuyuan City	抚远市	Fǔyuǎn Shì	126,694	6,260	20
7	Huanan County	桦南县	Huànán Xiàn	468,698	4,416	106
8	Huachuan County	桦川县	Huàchuān Xiàn	202,827	2,260	90
9	Tangyuan County	汤原县	Tāngyuán Xiàn	255,211	3,230	79

== Sport ==
Five of the players in the national bandy team at their first World Championships came from Jiamusi. It's one of the cities in which China Bandy Federation explores the potential for further development. The 13,000-capacity Jiamusi Stadium is located in the city. It opened in 2012 and it is used mainly for football.

== Economy ==
Jiamusi has long been a major transit port and distribution center of goods, and serves as the economic hub of eastern Heilongjiang province. In 2011, Jiamusi's GDP paced up to RMB 62.53 billion representing a steady growth of 14.2% from a year earlier. In 2015, Jiamusi has a GDP of RMB 81.01 billion.

Jiamusi is an agricultural production hub in Heilongjiang Province. Value-added output from the agricultural sector increased 14.2% to RMB 18.92 billion in 2011. Crop production of the city rose 26.8% to 7.3 million tons. In 2011, gross industrial output from enterprises with designated size or above of the city surpassed RMB 39.34 billion, increased 35.5% year on year. Gross output from heavy industry amounted to RMB 22.77 billion, increasing by 38.7% compared with a year ago, while that from light industry reached RMB 16.57 billion, surging 31.4% from the previous year. Heavy industry and light industry made up 64% and 36% of the city's total gross industrial output.

Electricity production and supply, construction materials, chemicals and agricultural products processing are the pillar industries in the city. Major industrial products in the city include cement, edible oils, fertilizer and feed. The industrial sector in Jiamusi is relatively weak compared with other cities in Heilongjiang such as Harbin and Daqing. In 2011, the service sector became the largest contributor of the city, which gained value-added output of RMB 26.99 billion. This contributes 43.2% to Jiamusi's economy. With the consumer market being very active, sales of consumer goods in Jiamusi amounted to RMB 24.55 billion in 2011, rising 18.2% year on year.

Foreign trade value increased 19.6% to RMB 3.65 billion in 2011. Export value was US$3.01 billion, representing a rise of 6.1% over the previous year. while import value stood at US$640 million, increased 197.5% year on year. Russia is Jiamusi's largest foreign trade partner. In 2011, foreign trade with Russia amounted to US$900 million, increased 24.5% over the previous year, accounting for 24.66% of the city's foreign trade. The utilized FDI in Jiamusi hit US$150 million in 2011, increased 33.5% over the previous year.

== Transportation ==
=== Railway ===
Jiamusi is a transportation hub in northeast Heilongjiang. Suijia (Suihua-Jiamusi) Railway and Tujia (Tumen-Jiamusi) Railway meet here. Trains from Jiamusi Railway Station connect the city with Beijing, Jinan, Dalian, Harbin, Tianjin and several other cities in China. On September 30, 2018, the Harbin–Jiamusi intercity railway was opened to passenger traffic, which shortened the travel time between Jiamusi and Harbin from six hours to two and half hours.

=== Highway ===
Jiamusi is served by the G1011 Harbin-Tongjiang Expressway, the G11 Hegang-Dalian Expressway, as well as six other highways, forming a comprehensive highway network.

=== Air ===
Jiamusi Dongjiao Airport is 9 km (5.6 mi) east of the city center, which offers flights to a number of domestic destinations and international destinations such as Khabarovsk and Seoul.

=== Ports and waterways ===
First built in 1919, Jiamusi Port is a major port along the downstream of Songhua River. The port was expanded in 1937 and became a Steel-structured-port. However, The annual throughput of the port was less than 120 thousand tons per year until PRC's foundation in 1949. In 2014 the annual throughput was about 1 million tons per year. Available from mid-April until the beginning of November, passenger ships sail from Jiamusi up the Songhua River to Qiqihar, Harbin or downstream to Tongjiang and Khabarovsk in Russia.

== Education ==
Jiamusi is home to Jiamusi University.

== Twin towns ==
=== Domestic ===
- Kunshan, Jiangsu
- Zhangzhou, Fujian
- Chaoyang, Beijing
- Guangyuan, Sichuan
- Jingzhou, Hubei
- Huludao, Liaoning
- Jilin, Jilin

=== International ===
- Nirasaki, Yamanashi Prefecture, Japan
- Komsomolsk-on-Amur, Khabarovsk Krai, Russia
- Shoalhaven, New South Wales, Australia
- Avellino, Italy
- Donghae, South Korea
