= Huachuan County =

Huachuan County 桦川县
- County
- county government building bus terminal Yuelai Avenue Riverside Park Huachuan Museum Songhua River

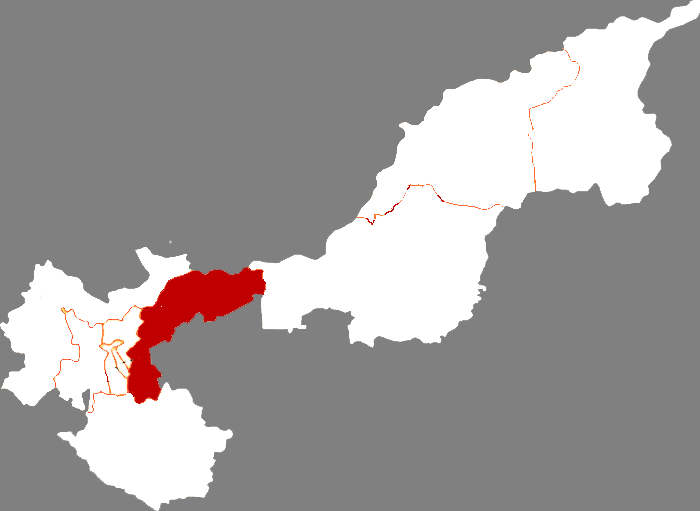

- Location in Heilongjiang
- Coordinates: 46°58′N 130°49′E
- Country: People's Republic of China
- Province: Heilongjiang
- Prefecture-level city: Jiamusi

Area
  - Total: 2,260 km^{2} (870 sq mi)

Population (2010)
  - Total: 202,827
  - Density: 89.7/km^{2} (232/sq mi)
- Time zone: UTC+8 (China Standard)

Huachuan County (simplified Chinese: 桦川县; traditional Chinese: 樺川縣; pinyin: Huàchuān Xiàn) is a county of eastern Heilongjiang province in the People's Republic of China. It is under the jurisdiction of the prefecture-level city of Jiamusi.

== Administrative divisions ==
Huachuan County is divided into 5 towns and 4 townships.

5 towns

- Hengtoushan (横头山镇), Sujiadian (苏家店镇), Yuelai (悦来镇), Xincheng (新城镇), Simajia (四马架镇)

4 townships

- Donghe (东河乡), Lifeng (梨丰乡), Chuangye (创业乡), Xinghuo (星火乡)

== Demographics ==
The population of the district was 212,323 in 1999.

== Climate ==
Climate data for Huachuan, elevation 78 m (256 ft), (1991–2020 normals, extremes 1981–2010)
| Month | Jan | Feb | Mar | Apr | May | Jun | Jul | Aug | Sep | Oct | Nov | Dec | Year |
|---|---|---|---|---|---|---|---|---|---|---|---|---|---|
| Record high °C (°F) | 1.0 (33.8) | 8.5 (47.3) | 20.1 (68.2) | 31.0 (87.8) | 32.7 (90.9) | 36.8 (98.2) | 36.6 (97.9) | 35.7 (96.3) | 31.6 (88.9) | 26.4 (79.5) | 16.2 (61.2) | 4.5 (40.1) | 36.8 (98.2) |
| Mean daily maximum °C (°F) | −12.6 (9.3) | −7.1 (19.2) | 1.6 (34.9) | 12.5 (54.5) | 20.3 (68.5) | 24.9 (76.8) | 27.3 (81.1) | 25.8 (78.4) | 21.0 (69.8) | 11.6 (52.9) | −1.4 (29.5) | −11.4 (11.5) | 9.4 (48.9) |
| Daily mean °C (°F) | −18.6 (−1.5) | −13.8 (7.2) | −4.3 (24.3) | 6.2 (43.2) | 14.4 (57.9) | 19.8 (67.6) | 22.6 (72.7) | 20.7 (69.3) | 14.6 (58.3) | 5.6 (42.1) | −6.3 (20.7) | −16.4 (2.5) | 3.7 (38.7) |
| Mean daily minimum °C (°F) | −24.1 (−11.4) | −20.4 (−4.7) | −10.4 (13.3) | 0.1 (32.2) | 8.7 (47.7) | 15.2 (59.4) | 18.3 (64.9) | 16.4 (61.5) | 9.1 (48.4) | 0.3 (32.5) | −10.9 (12.4) | −21.3 (−6.3) | −1.6 (29.2) |
| Record low °C (°F) | −38.2 (−36.8) | −36.1 (−33.0) | −30.7 (−23.3) | −11.4 (11.5) | −4.6 (23.7) | 6.2 (43.2) | 11.5 (52.7) | 7.7 (45.9) | −2.1 (28.2) | −13.7 (7.3) | −27.9 (−18.2) | −35.0 (−31.0) | −38.2 (−36.8) |
| Average precipitation mm (inches) | 5.4 (0.21) | 4.4 (0.17) | 12.1 (0.48) | 24.0 (0.94) | 56.5 (2.22) | 91.1 (3.59) | 124.2 (4.89) | 122.1 (4.81) | 59.7 (2.35) | 31.6 (1.24) | 13.0 (0.51) | 9.1 (0.36) | 553.2 (21.77) |
| Average precipitation days (≥ 0.1 mm) | 5.2 | 4.1 | 6.2 | 7.1 | 11.4 | 12.5 | 13.2 | 13.6 | 10.6 | 7.4 | 5.6 | 6.8 | 103.7 |
| Average snowy days | 6.7 | 5.1 | 6.6 | 2.9 | 0 | 0 | 0 | 0 | 0 | 2.3 | 6.5 | 8.4 | 38.5 |
| Average relative humidity (%) | 71 | 66 | 61 | 57 | 62 | 73 | 82 | 83 | 75 | 66 | 67 | 71 | 70 |
| Mean monthly sunshine hours | 176.7 | 198.0 | 235.2 | 227.8 | 249.8 | 244.0 | 241.6 | 229.7 | 220.7 | 194.6 | 162.6 | 156.8 | 2,537.5 |
| Percentage possible sunshine | 63 | 68 | 63 | 56 | 54 | 52 | 51 | 53 | 59 | 59 | 59 | 59 | 58 |
Source: China Meteorological Administration
