= Ruisui =

Ruisui Township 瑞穗鄉 Mizuho
- Rural township
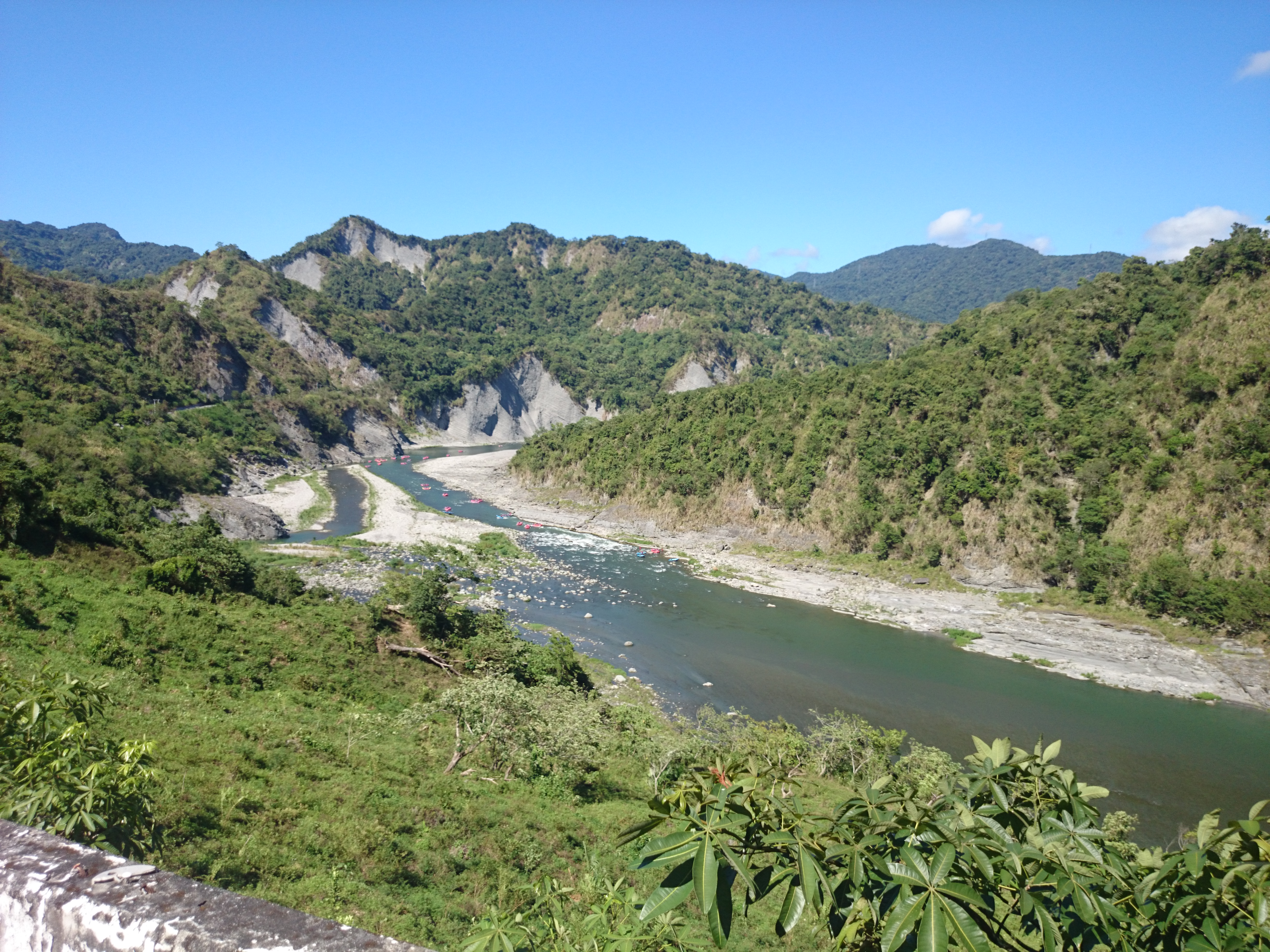
- The Xiuguluan River near Jimei, Ruisui Township
- Nickname: 水尾 (Mizuo)
- Coordinates: 23°26′0″N 121°30′0″E
- Country: Taiwan
- Region: Eastern Taiwan

Government
  - Type: Township

Area
  - Total: 135.5862 km^{2} (52.3501 sq mi)

Population (March 2023)
  - Total: 10,944
- Time zone: UTC+8 (CST)
- Post code: 978
- Subdivision: 11 Villages
- Website: www.juisui.gov.tw (Chinese)

Ruisui Township
- Chinese: 瑞穗鄉
- Hanyu Pinyin: Ruìsuì Xiāng
- Wade–Giles: Jui^{4}-sui^{4} Hsiang^{1}
- Pha̍k-fa-sṳ: Lui-sui-hiông
- Hokkien POJ: Sūi-sūi-hiong or Sūi-hūi-hiong

Ruisui Township is a rural township located in southern Hualien County, Taiwan, and has a population of 10,944 inhabitants in 11 villages.

The population is composed of Hoklo, Hakka, and Taiwanese aborigines, most of whom are Amis. Agriculture and tourism are major industries.

== History ==
During Qing rule, the headquarters of Taitung Prefecture was located in modern-day Ruisui, known then as Tsui-be, or Tsui-boe (Chinese: 水尾; Pe̍h-ōe-jī: Chúi-bóe). Those Chinese characters (水尾) were rendered Mizuo in Japanese during Japanese rule of Taiwan, but were later changed to 瑞穗, Mizuho in 1917. This written form was retained after the Kuomintang takeover of Taiwan in 1945; the characters are pronounced Sūi-sūi and Ruìsuì in Taiwanese and Mandarin Chinese, respectively.

== Geography ==
The township lies in an alluvial plain which located midway up the Huadong Valley between the Central Mountain Range, Coastal Mountain Range and Wuhe Terrace. Rafting activity on the Xiuguluan River often starts from the Ruisui Bridge.

The climate is between tropical and subtropical monsoon with a humid climate.

The Tropic of Cancer passes through the township.

== Administrative divisions ==
The township comprises 11 villages: Fumin, Fuxing, Fuyuan, Hegang, Jimei, Ruibei, Ruiliang, Ruimei, Ruisui, Ruixiang and Wuhe.

== Tourist attractions ==
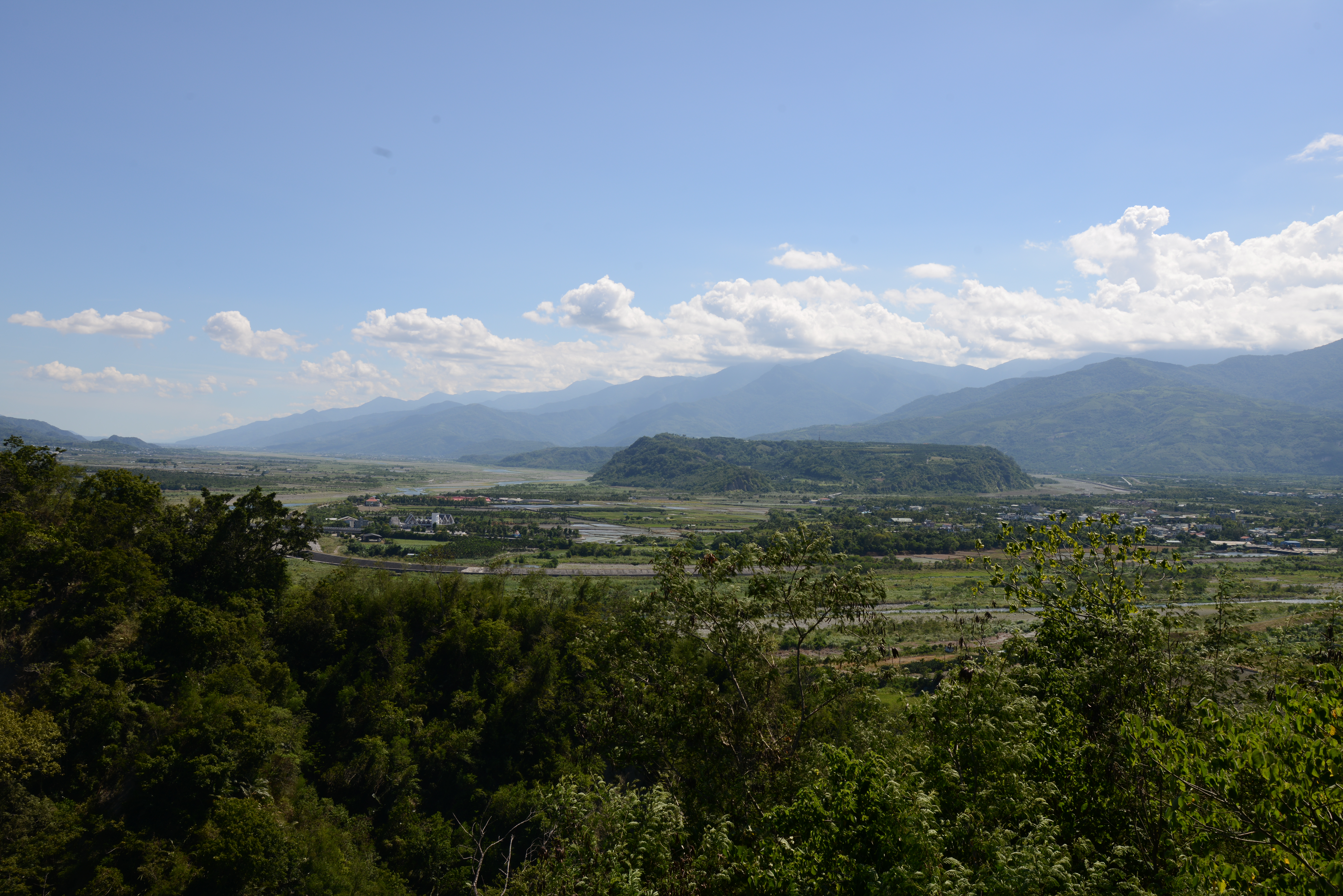
Wuhe Terrace, known for the cultivation of Wuhe Tea

- Fuyuan National Forest Recreation Area
- Rareseed Ranch
- Ruisui Tropic of Cancer Marker
- Saoba Stone Pillars
- Ruisui Hotspring
- Honyeh Hotspring (Red Leaf Hotspring)
- Wuhe Terrace Tea Plantations
- Ruisui Rafting Tourist Center (Xiuguluan River Rafting)
- Ruisui Range
- Fuyuan Bao'an Temple
- Fuyuan Butterfly Village
- Maliyun Tribal Village
- Ruisui Qinglian Temple

== Transportation ==
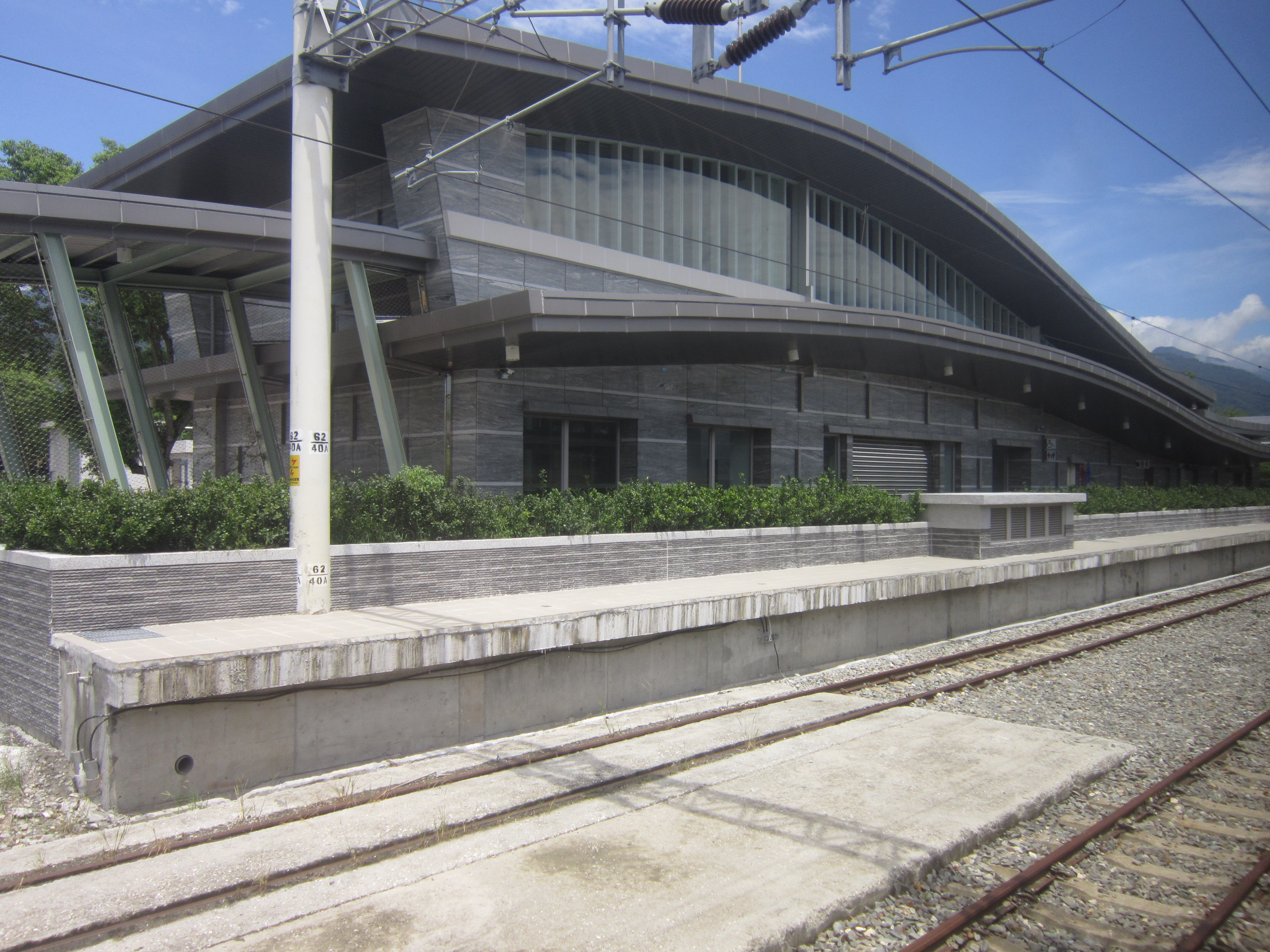
Ruisui Station on the Hualien–Taitung Line

Taiwan Railway stations on the Hualien–Taitung Line in Ruisui include:

- Fuyuan Station
- Ruisui Station

Highways in Ruisui include:

- Provincial Highway 9, a north–south route through the Huadong Valley
- County Road 193, a parallel route crisscrossing the Xiugulan River

== Sister cities ==
- Misato, Akita, Japan (friendship city)

== Notable natives ==
- T.H. Tung, businessperson

== Bibliography ==
- Campbell, William (1896). "The island of Formosa: Its past and future". Scottish Geographical Magazine. 12 (8): 385–399. doi:10.1080/00369229608732903.
