= Saoba Stone Pillars =

Archaeological site in Ruisui, Hualien County, Taiwan

- 掃叭石柱 (Chinese)
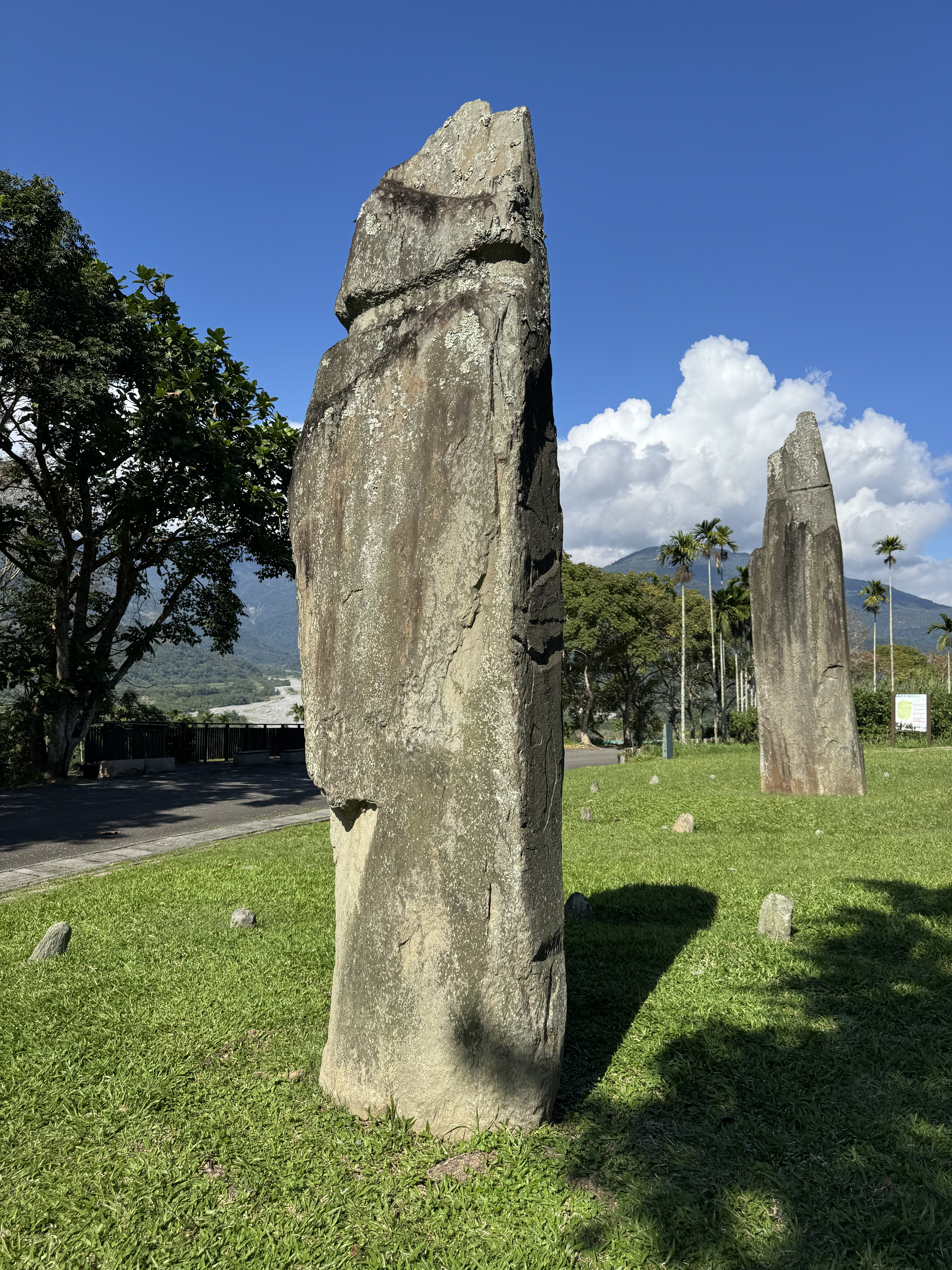

- Location within Hualien County
- 23°28′14.8″N 121°21′33.9″E
- Type: archaeological site
- Location: Ruisui, Hualien County, Taiwan

History
- Built: Stone Age

Saoba Stone Pillars (traditional Chinese: 掃叭石柱; simplified Chinese: 扫叭石柱; pinyin: Sǎobā Shízhù), as known as Wuhe Stone Pillars (Chinese: 舞鶴石柱; pinyin: Wǔhè Shízhù) and Satokoay Stone Pillars, is an archaeological site at Wuhe Village, Ruisui Township, Hualien County, Taiwan.

== History ==
The stone pillars are artifacts from Beinan culture, dating to around 2,000-3,000 years ago during the Neolithic period. The site has been classified as a Grade 3 national historic monument by the Ministry of the Interior.

== Geology ==
The stones stand along the Wuhe Terrace. The site consists of two adjacent stone pillars, one standing 5.75 metres (18 ft 10 in) tall and the other 3.99 metres (13 ft 1 in). It is located in an oval area 600 metres (2,000 ft) long and 400 metres (1,300 ft) wide.

== See also ==
- List of parks in Taiwan
- Prehistory of Taiwan
