= Qianjin District, Jiamusi =

Qianjin District 前进区
- District
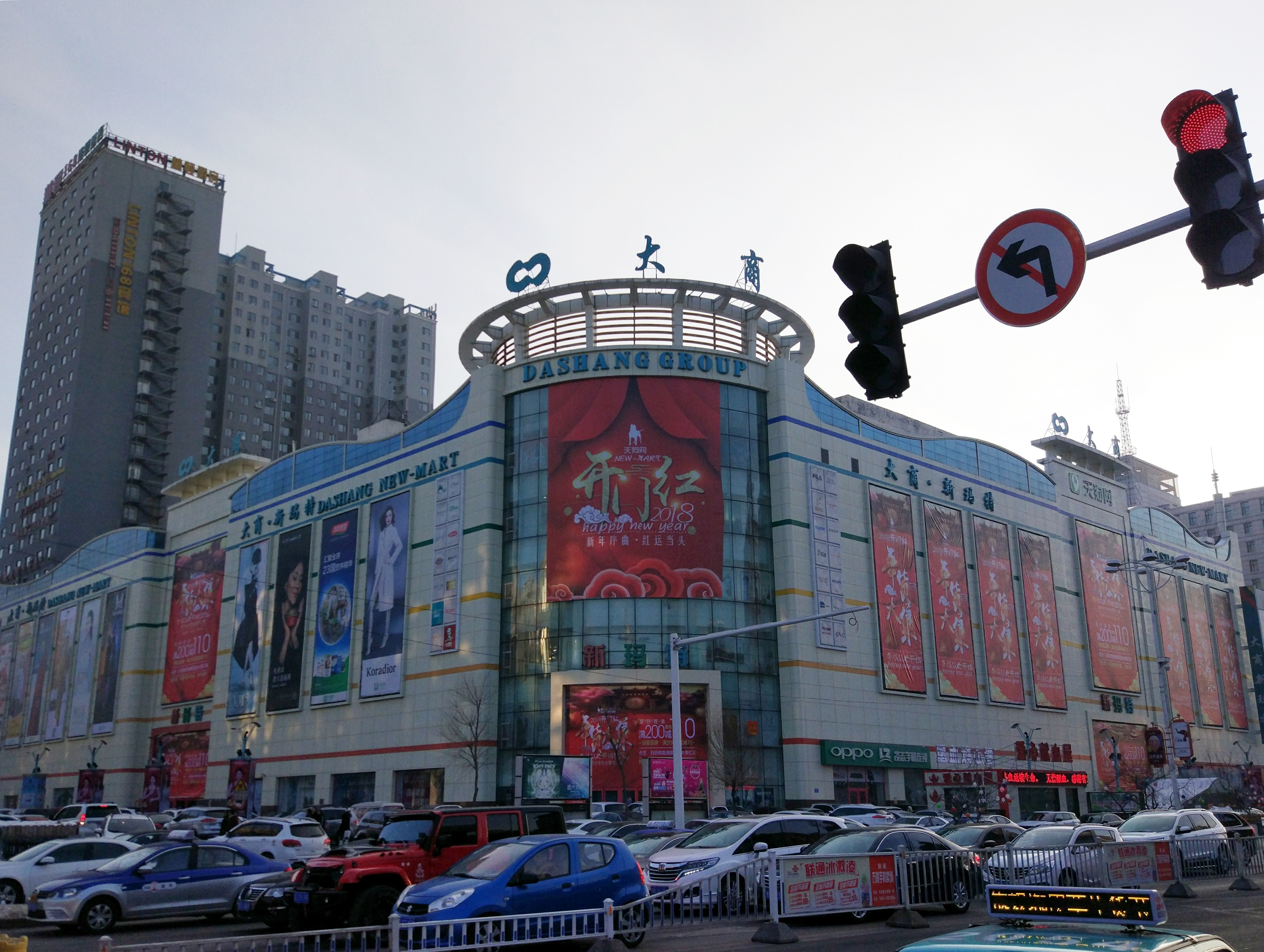
- New Mart Plaza of Jiamusi

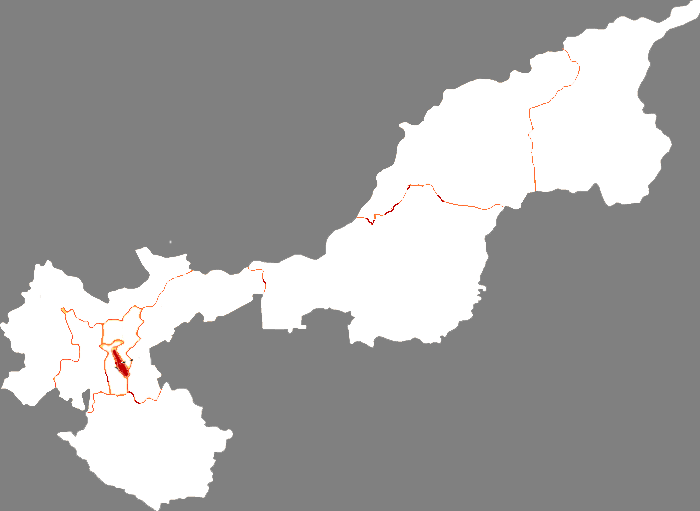
- Location of Qianjin District in Jiamusi
- Country: China
- Province: Heilongjiang
- Prefecture-level city: Jiamusi
- District seat: Yong'an Subdistrict

Area
  - Total: 13.72 km^{2} (5.30 sq mi)

Population (2020 census)
  - Total: 180,893
  - Density: 13,180/km^{2} (34,150/sq mi)
- Time zone: UTC+8 (China Standard)
- Postal code: 10002X
- Website: www.jmsqjq.gov.cn

Qianjin District (simplified Chinese: 前进区; traditional Chinese: 前進區; pinyin: Qiánjìn Qū) is a district of the city of Jiamusi, Heilongjiang, China, located on the southern (right) bank of the Songhua River.

== Administrative divisions ==
Qianjin District is divided into 4 subdistricts:

- Yong'an Subdistrict (永安街道)
- Gangwan Subdistrict (港湾街道)
- Heping Subdistrict (和平街道)
- Shanshui Subdistrict (山水街道)
