= Fuyuan National Forest Recreation Area =

Forest in Ruisui, Hualien County, Taiwan

Fuyuan National Forest Recreation Area Chinese: 富源國家森林遊樂區
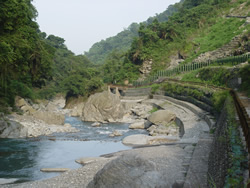

- Location within Hualien County
- Interactive map of Fuyuan National Forest Recreation Area

Geography
- Location: Ruisui, Hualien County, Taiwan
- Coordinates: 23°35′09.3″N 121°22′06.7″E
- Elevation: 225–750 m (738–2,461 ft)
- Area: 235 ha (580 acres)

Fuyuan National Forest Recreation Area (traditional Chinese: 富源國家森林遊樂區; simplified Chinese: 富源国家森林游乐区; pinyin: Fùyuán Guójiā Sēnlín Yóulè Qū), also known as “Butterfly Valley”, is a forest recreation area located in Fuyuan Village, Ruisui Township, Hualien County, Taiwan.

== Geology ==
The recreation area lies at an elevation of 225–750 metres (738–2,461 ft) above sea level and covers a total area of 235 hectares (580 acres). The region has an average annual temperature of 23 °C (73 °F). The Fuyuan River flows through the area, and the Fuyuan Waterfalls are located within its boundaries. Facilities include barbecue areas, a campground, and hiking trails.

== See also ==
- Geography of Taiwan
