= Tropic of Cancer Science Park =

Science museum in Gujarat, India

- Established: 11 March 2026; 8 months ago
- Location: Salal, Prantij Taluka, Sabarkantha district, Gujarat, India
- Coordinates: 23.4982982°N 72.9082172°E
- Type: Science museum
- Owners: Department of Science and Technology, Government of Gujarat

The Tropic of Cancer Science Park is a science museum located on National Highway-48 near Salal village in Prantij Taluka, Sabarkantha district, Gujarat, India. Opened in 2026, it is situated directly on the path of the Tropic of Cancer. It is developed as an educational and research facility.

== History ==
The museum was first announced in the state budget of Gujarat in 2021. Initially estimated at the cost of ₹6 crore (US$640,000), the construction started on 23 October 2022. It was inaugurated by the Chief Minister of Gujarat, Bhupendra Patel, on 11 March 2026. It was developed at an estimated cost of ₹8 crore (US$850,000) by the Gujarat Council on Science and Technology (GUJCOST) and is operated by the Department of Science and Technology of the Government of Gujarat.

== Features ==
The museum covers an area of 5,930 square metres (63,800 ft^{2}). It is designed to serve as an educational and research facility as well as the science tourism hub. It is situated directly on the path where the Tropic of Cancer passes through the region.

There is a 25-metre high and 8-metre wide Tropic of Cancer Tower as well as a sundial. There are engineering, physics, geography and life science galleries in an exhibition hall spread over an area of 800 metres (2,600 ft). It features exhibits on the scientific, astronomical and geographical importance of the Tropic of Cancer as well as geocoordinates. The exhibits on the Earth-Sun relationship, seasons and related scientific topics are also displayed.

It remains open to visitors daily from 9:00 am to 6:00 pm.
