= Karenkō Shrine =

Shinto shrine in Taiwan

Coordinates: 23°59′6.5″N 121°36′39.4″E

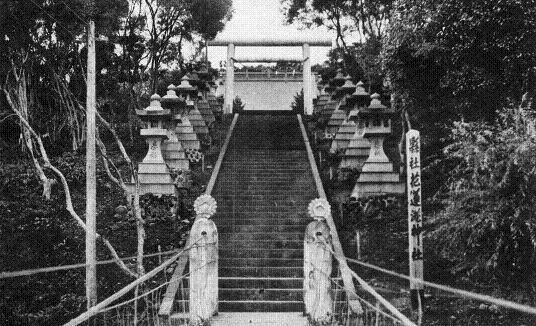
Karenkō Shrine

Karenkō Shrine (花蓮港神社, Karenkō jinja) was a Shinto shrine located in Hualien City, Hualien County (formerly Karenkō city, Karenkō Prefecture) in Taiwan during Japanese colonial rule. It was ranked as a Prefectural Shrine (県社 kensha) and was the central shrine in Karenkō Prefecture.

== History ==
The shrine was built on August 19, 1915 (Taishō 4). Prince Yoshihisa and the Three Kami Deities of Cultivation (開拓三神 kaitaku sannin) (Ōkunitama no Mikoto (大国魂命), Ōnamuchi no Mikoto (大己貴命), Sukunahikona no Mikoto (少彦名命)) were enshrined. On March 2, 1921 (Taishō 10) the shrine was classified as a Prefectural Shrine.

After World War II, the shrine became a martyrs' shrine honoring Taiwan's heroes such as Tei Seikō (Koxinga), Liu Yongfu, and Qiu Fengjia (邱逢甲). In 1981, the shrine was demolished to make way for the Hualien Martyrs' Shrine which was built in the Northern Palace Architecture style.

== See also ==
- List of Shinto shrines in Taiwan
