= Ho-Ping Power Company =

Independent power producer of Taiwan

Ho-Ping Power Company 和平電力
- Industry: electric power
- Founded: 29 October 1997
- Headquarters: Xiulin, Hualien County, Taiwan
- Website: Official website (in Chinese)

The Ho-Ping Power Company (HPC; traditional Chinese: 和平電力; simplified Chinese: 和平电力; pinyin: Hépíng Diànlì) is an independent power producer company in Taiwan. The company is the subsidiary of Taiwan Cement Corporation and One Energy Holdings Limited.

== Activities ==
HPC participates in the Greenhouse Gas Inventory and Verification Trial Plan promoted by the Energy Bureau of the Ministry of Economic Affairs and the 'Greenhouse Gas Registration, Verification and Voluntary Reduction Trial Plan by the Environmental Protection Administration.

== Power plants ==
- Hoping Power Plant in Xiulin Township, Hualien County

== See also ==
- List of companies of Taiwan
- Electricity sector in Taiwan
- List of power stations in Taiwan
