= Taroko =

Taroko may refer to:

- Taroko people, indigenous people of Taiwan related to the Seediq
  - Taroko language or Seediq, language of the Taroko people
- Taroko Mountain, mountain in Taiwan
- Taroko National Park, national park in Taiwan
- Taroko Park, amusement park and shopping center in Kaohsiung, Taiwan
- Taroko Express, express train service of the Taiwan Railways Administration
- Taroko Bus, bus company serving northern Hualien County, Taiwan

== See also ==
- Seediq (disambiguation)
