= HPC =

HPC may refer to:

== Organisations ==
- Health Professions Council, a British regulator
- Hmar People's Convention, an Indian political party
- Ho-Ping Power Company, Taiwan
- Croatian Orthodox Church (Croatian: Hrvatska pravoslavna crkva; 1942–1945)
- Hydrometeorological Prediction Center, United States
- Afghan High Peace Council, Afghanistan

== Science, technology and mathematics ==
- Hardware performance counters, in computers
- Hasty Pudding cipher, in cryptography
- Hemangiopericytoma, a cancerous tumour
- Heterotrophic Plate Count, in ecology
- High Power Charging, for electric vehicles
- High-performance computing
  - HPC Challenge Benchmark
- Hilbert system, a formal proof system in logic
- Hilbert–Pólya conjecture, a conjecture in number theory
- History of presenting complaint, in a British medical history
- Hot potassium carbonate, a carbon scrubbing method for gases
- Hydroxypropyl cellulose, in organic chemistry and pharmacology
- Hematopoietic Progenitor Cell, a cell therapy

== Other uses ==
- Hinkley Point C nuclear power station, England
- Hydraulic Press Channel, a Finnish YouTube channel
- HeartCatch PreCure!, an anime series (2010–2011), not to be confused with Hug! Pretty Cure (HuPC)
- Hi-Point carbine, a series of American guns
- Helios Pickleball Center, an under construction indoor pickleball complex in the Philippines

== See also ==
- Windows HPC Server 2008, an operating system for high-performance computing by Microsoft
