= Karenkō Prefecture =

Prefecture of Taiwan under Japanese rule

Karenkō Prefecture 花蓮港廳
- Karenkō-chō
- 1909-1952
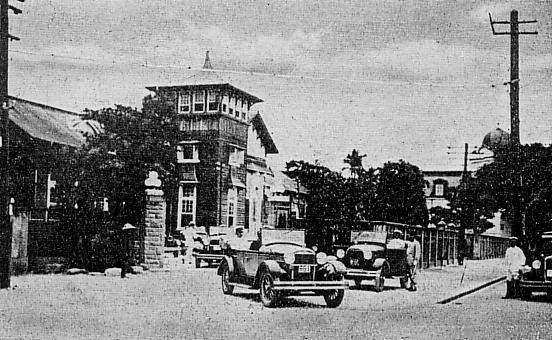
- The Karenkō Prefecture government building
- Capital: Hualien City
- Population
  - 1941: 153,785
- Historical era: Taiwan under Japanese rule
  - Established: 1909
  - Disestablished: 25 October 1945
  - Treaty of San Francisco: 28 April 1952
- Political subdivisions: 1 city (市); 3 districts (郡)
- Today part of: Hualien County

Karenkō Prefecture

Karenkō Prefecture (花蓮港廳, Karenkō-chō) was one of the administrative divisions of Taiwan during Japanese rule. The prefecture consisted of modern-day Hualien County. The prefecture was named after lotus flowers.

== Population ==
Total population	153,785
Japanese	20,914
Taiwanese	130,720
Korean	119
1941 (Showa 16) census.

== Administrative divisions ==
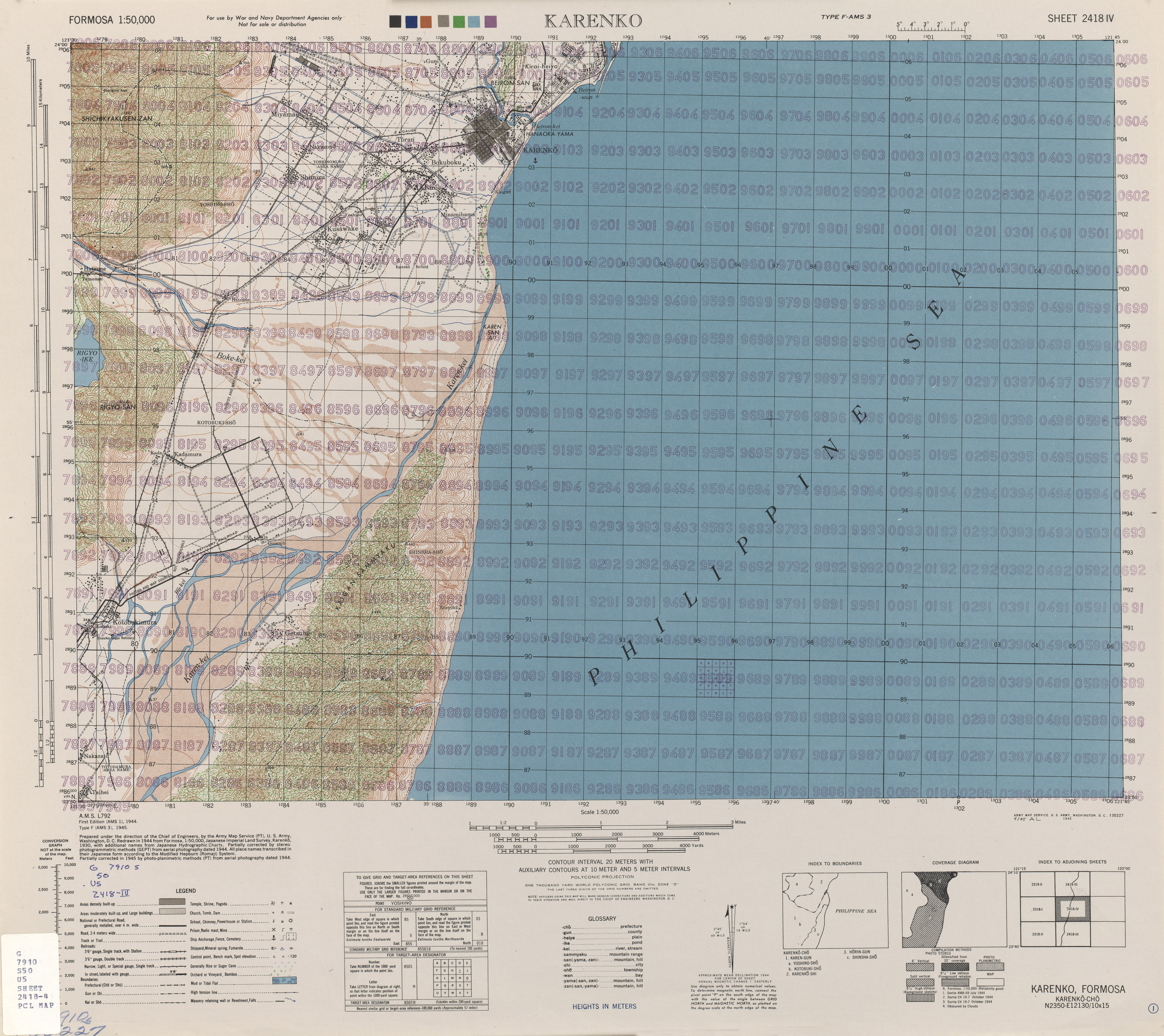
Map of part of Karenkō Prefecture (1944)

=== Cities and Districts ===
In 1945 (Shōwa 20), there were

one city and three districts.

Cities (市 shi)			Districts (郡 gun)		
Name	Kanji	Kana	Name	Kanji	Kana
Karenkō City	花蓮港市	かれんこうし	Karen District	花蓮郡	かれんぐん
Karenkō City	花蓮港市	かれんこうし	Hōrin District	鳳林郡	ほうりんぐん
Karenkō City	花蓮港市	かれんこうし	Tamazato District	玉里郡	たまざとぐん

=== Towns and Villages ===
The districts are divided into towns (街) and villages (庄)

District	Name	Kanji	Notes
Karen 花蓮郡	Yoshino village	吉野庄	Today Ji'an Township
Karen 花蓮郡	Kotobuki village	壽庄	Today Shoufeng Township
Karen 花蓮郡	Kenkai village	研海庄	Today Xincheng Township
Karen 花蓮郡	Aboriginal Area	蕃地	Today Xiulin Township
Karen 花蓮郡	Karenkō town	花蓮港街	Upgraded to a city in 1940. Today Hualien City
Hōrin 鳳林郡	Hōrin town	鳳林街	Today Fenglin Township and part of Guangfu Township
Hōrin 鳳林郡	Mizuho village	瑞穗庄	Today Ruisui Township and part of Guangfu Township
Hōrin 鳳林郡	Shinsha village	新社庄	Today Fengbin Township
Hōrin 鳳林郡	Aboriginal Area	蕃地	Today Wanrong Township
Tamazato 玉里郡	Tamazato town	玉里街	Today Yuli Township
Tamazato 玉里郡	Tomizato village	富里庄	Today Fuli Township
Tamazato 玉里郡	Aboriginal Area	蕃地	Today Zhuoxi Township

== Karenkō Shrine ==
Karenkō Shrine was a Shinto shrine located in Hualien City, Hualien County (formerly Karenkō city, in Taiwan during Japanese colonial rule. It was ranked as a Prefectural Shrine and was the central shrine in Karenkō Prefecture.

=== History ===
The shrine was built on August 19, 1915 (Taishō 4). Prince Yoshihisa and the Three Kami Deities of Cultivation no Mikoto, Ōnamuchi no Mikoto, no Mikoto were enshrined. On March 2, 1921 the shrine was classified as a Prefectural Shrine.

After World War II, the shrine became a martyrs' shrine honoring Taiwan's heroes such as Tei Seikō, Liu Yongfu, and Qiu Fengjia. In 1981, the shrine was demolished to make way for the Hualien Martyrs' Shrine which was built in the Northern Palace Architecture style.

== See also ==
- Political divisions of Taiwan (1895-1945)
- Governor-General of Taiwan
- Taiwan under Japanese rule
- Administrative divisions of the Republic of China
