= Hoping Power Plant =

Power plant in Xiulin, Hualien County, Taiwan

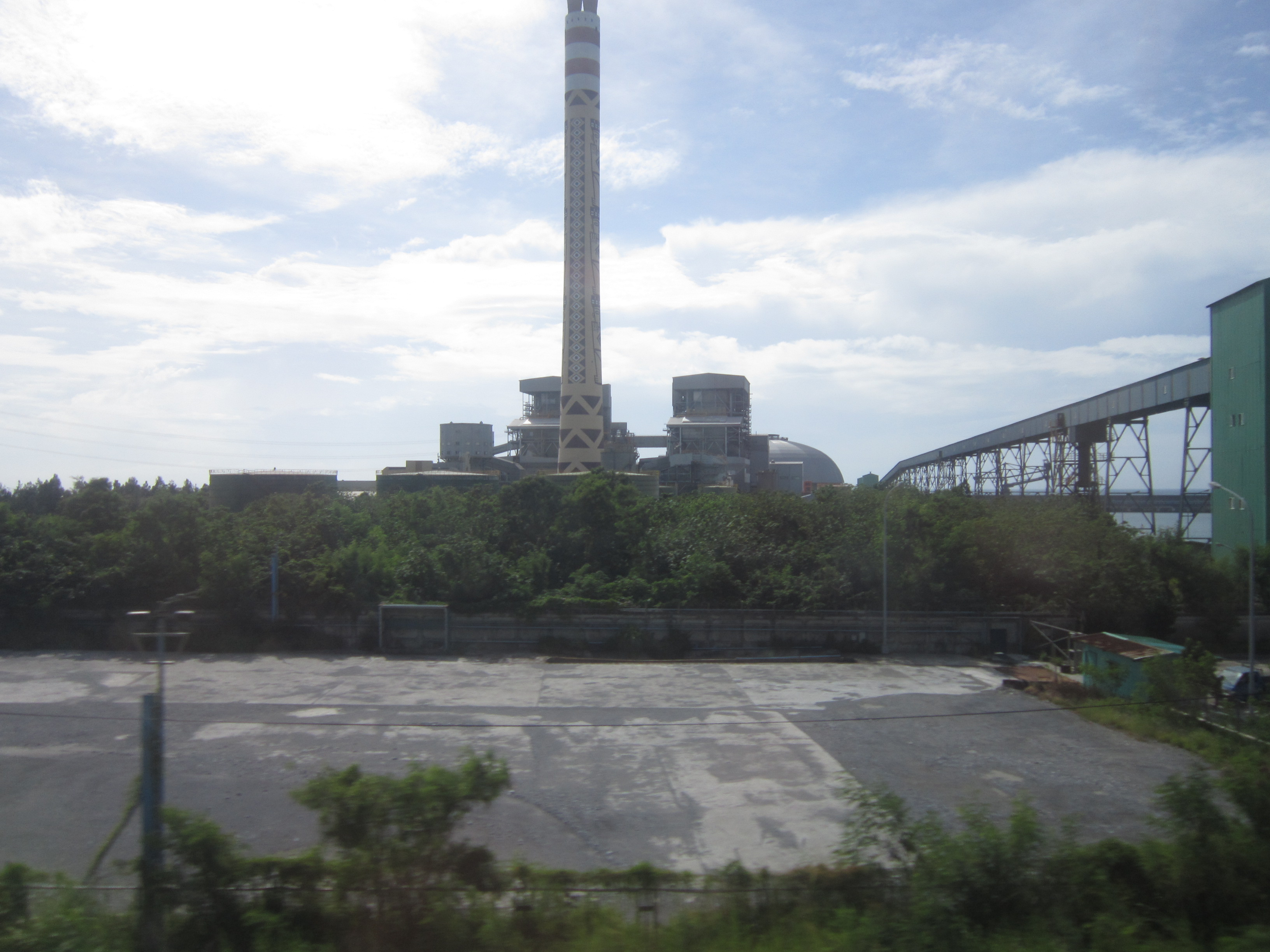
- Official name: 和平電廠
- Country: Taiwan
- Location: Xiulin, Hualien County, Taiwan
- Coordinates: 24°18′24″N 121°45′50″E
- Status: Operational
- Commission date: June 2002 (Unit 1); September 2002 (Unit 2)
- Owner: Ho-Ping Power Company
- Operator: Ho-Ping Power Company

Thermal power station
- Primary fuel: Coal

Power generation
- Nameplate capacity: 2 X 660 MW

External links
- Commons: Related media on Commons

The Hoping Power Plant (traditional Chinese: 和平電廠; simplified Chinese: 和平电厂; pinyin: Hépíng Diànchǎng) is a coal-fired power plant in Xiulin Township, Hualien County, Taiwan. With the installed capacity of 1,320 MW, it is the fourth largest coal-fired power plant in Taiwan. Its smokestack has a height of 250 metres. Its diameter is 25.1 metres at the base and 17.3 metres at the top.

== Generation ==
Electricity generated by the power plant supplies the major load located in the north of Taiwan.

== Ownership ==
The power plant is fully owned by Ho-Ping Power Company. The equity interest is divided to CLP Group (20%), Mitsubishi Corporation (20%) and Taiwan Cement Corporation (60%).

== Events ==
On 29 July 2017, a transmission tower for the outgoing lines of the plant collapsed due to Typhoon Nesat, which caused the electricity supply to Taiwan down by 4%. The tower was reconstructed on 11 August 2017 and completed in the following day, which became the fastest power line reparation in the history of Taiwan. On 13 August, the plant resumed its operation and reached its full generating capacity the day after.

On 15 August 2017, the plant tripped due to the breakdown of one of its generator causing a loss of 650 MW power generation.

On 23 August 2017, a furnace pipe of generator no. 2 broke, causing a drop in electricity generation.

== Transportation ==
Hoping Power Plant is accessible within walking distance northeast of Heping Station of Taiwan Railway.

== See also ==
- List of power stations in Taiwan
- List of coal power stations
- Electricity sector in Taiwan
