= Mount Wuming =

Mountain in Xiulin, Hualien County, Taiwan

- Location within Taiwan

Highest point
- Elevation: 3,451 m (11,322 ft)
- Coordinates: 24.2586°N 121.3819°E

Naming
- Native name: 無明山 (Chinese)

Geography
- Location: Xiulin Township, Hualien County, Taiwan

Mount Wuming (Chinese: 無明山; pinyin: Wúmíng Shān) is a mountain in Xiulin Township, Hualien County, Taiwan with an elevation of 3,451 m (11,322 ft).

== See also ==
- List of mountains in Taiwan
