= Hualien Martyrs' Shrine =

Martyrs' shrine in Hualien City, Hualien County, Taiwan

- 花蓮忠烈祠
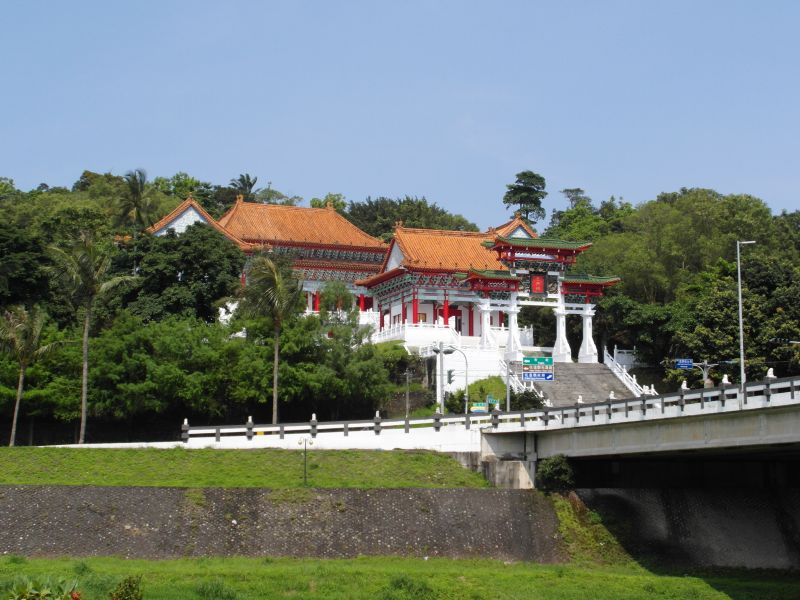

- Location within Hualien County

Location
- Location: Hualien City, Hualien County, Taiwan
- Interactive map of Hualien Martyrs' Shrine
- Coordinates: 23°59′06.6″N 121°36′40.2″E

Architecture
- Type: martyrs' shrine
- Completed: 19 August 1915

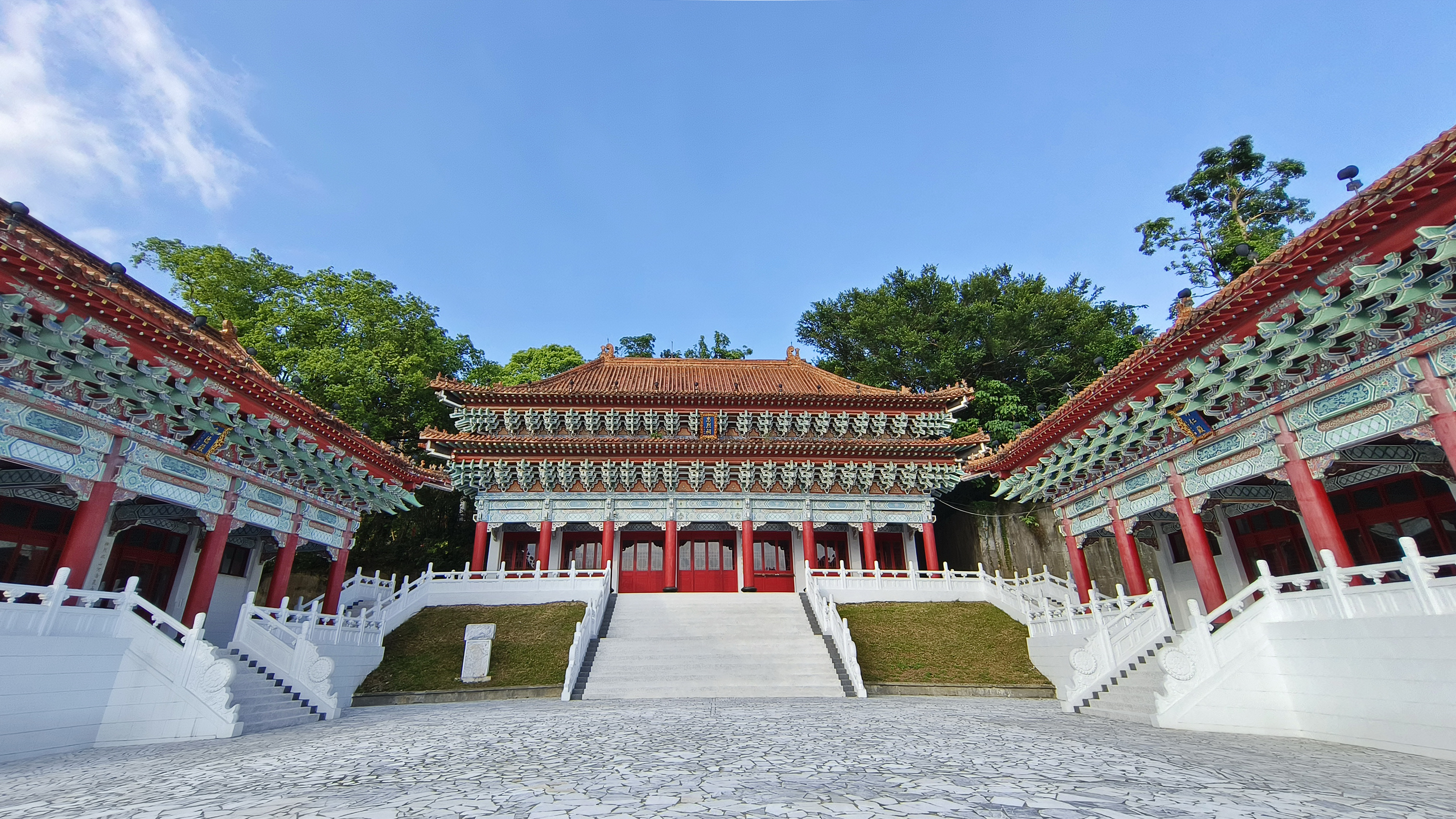
Hualien Martyrs' Shrine

The Hualien Martyrs' Shrine (traditional Chinese: 花蓮忠烈祠; simplified Chinese: 花莲忠烈祠; pinyin: Huālián Zhōngliècí) is a martyrs' shrine in Hualien City, Hualien County, Taiwan.

== History ==
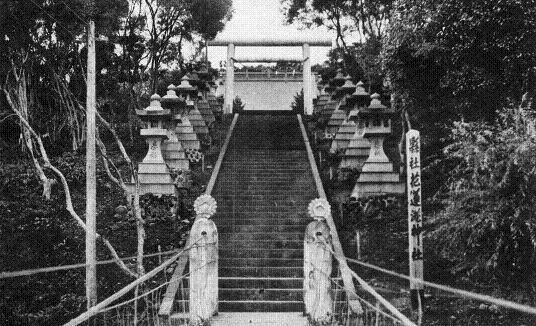
Karenkō Shrine

The site was originally established as Karenkō Shrine during the Japanese rule of Taiwan on 19 August 1915. Due to the switch of diplomatic relations by Japan from the Republic of China to the People's Republic of China in 1972, there was an anti-Japanese sentiment in the island, which led to the demolishing of Japan-built buildings around Taiwan. In 1981, the shrine was demolished to make way for the construction of Hualien Martyrs' Shrine.

== Buildings ==
The Hualien Martyrs' Shrine was constructed in the Chinese palace style, which aligns its architectural design with many other Martyrs' Shrines across Taiwan. Upon entering, visitors first encounter a red and white multi-tiered Chinese-style Pailou Gate. This gate features a central plaque inscribed with the words "Martyrs' Shrine" in golden Chinese characters. Beyond the gate lies the "Hall of Righteousness," followed by the main hall known as the "Martyrs' Shrine." Flanking the main hall are two additional buildings: "The Hall of Benevolent Admiration" on the left and "The Hall of Sublime Virtue" on the right.

== Transportation ==
The site is accessible within walking distance (approximately 1.7 km) south east of Hualien Station of Taiwan Railway.

== Gallery ==
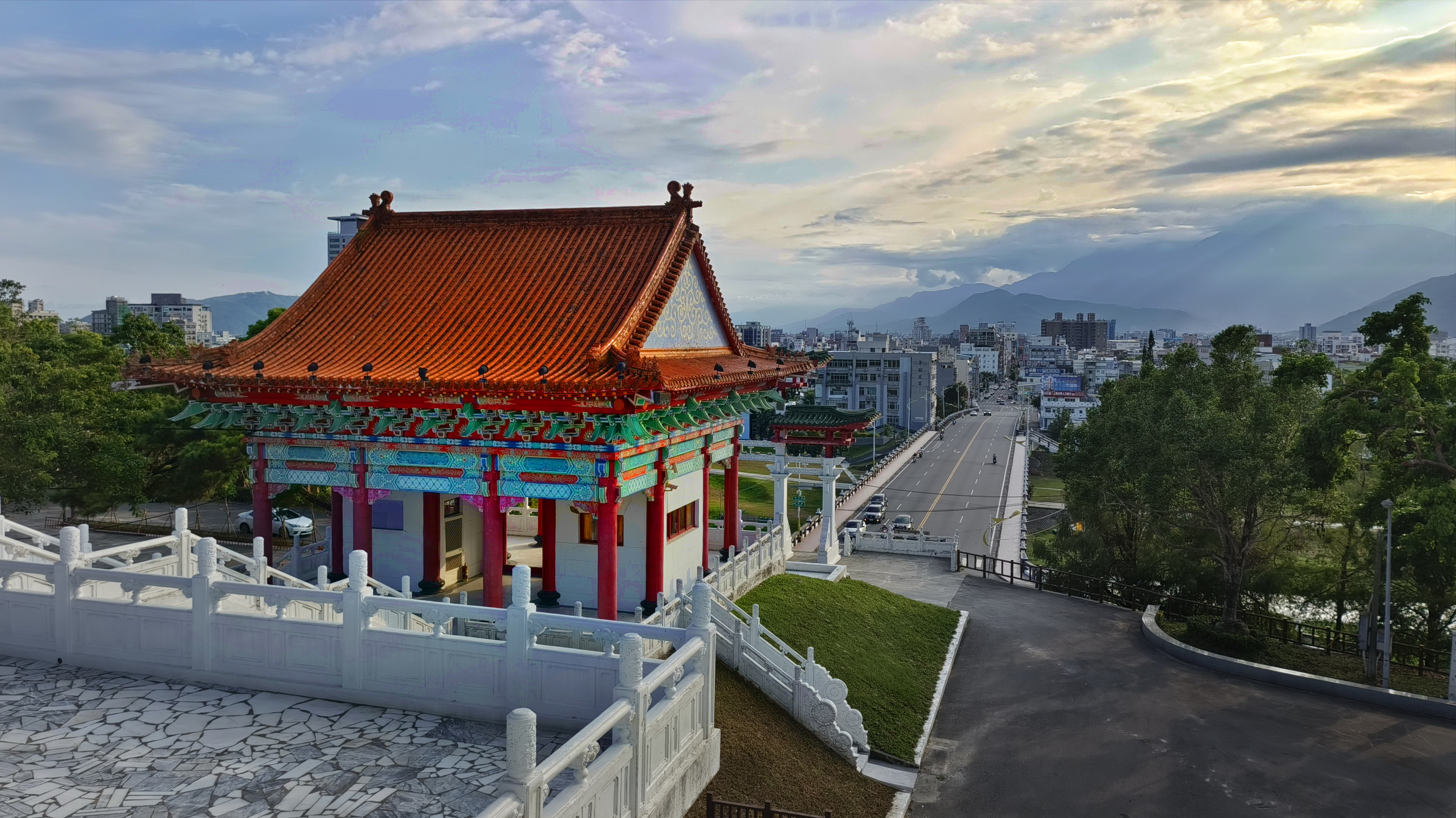
Hall of Righteousness and the Shangzhi Bridge

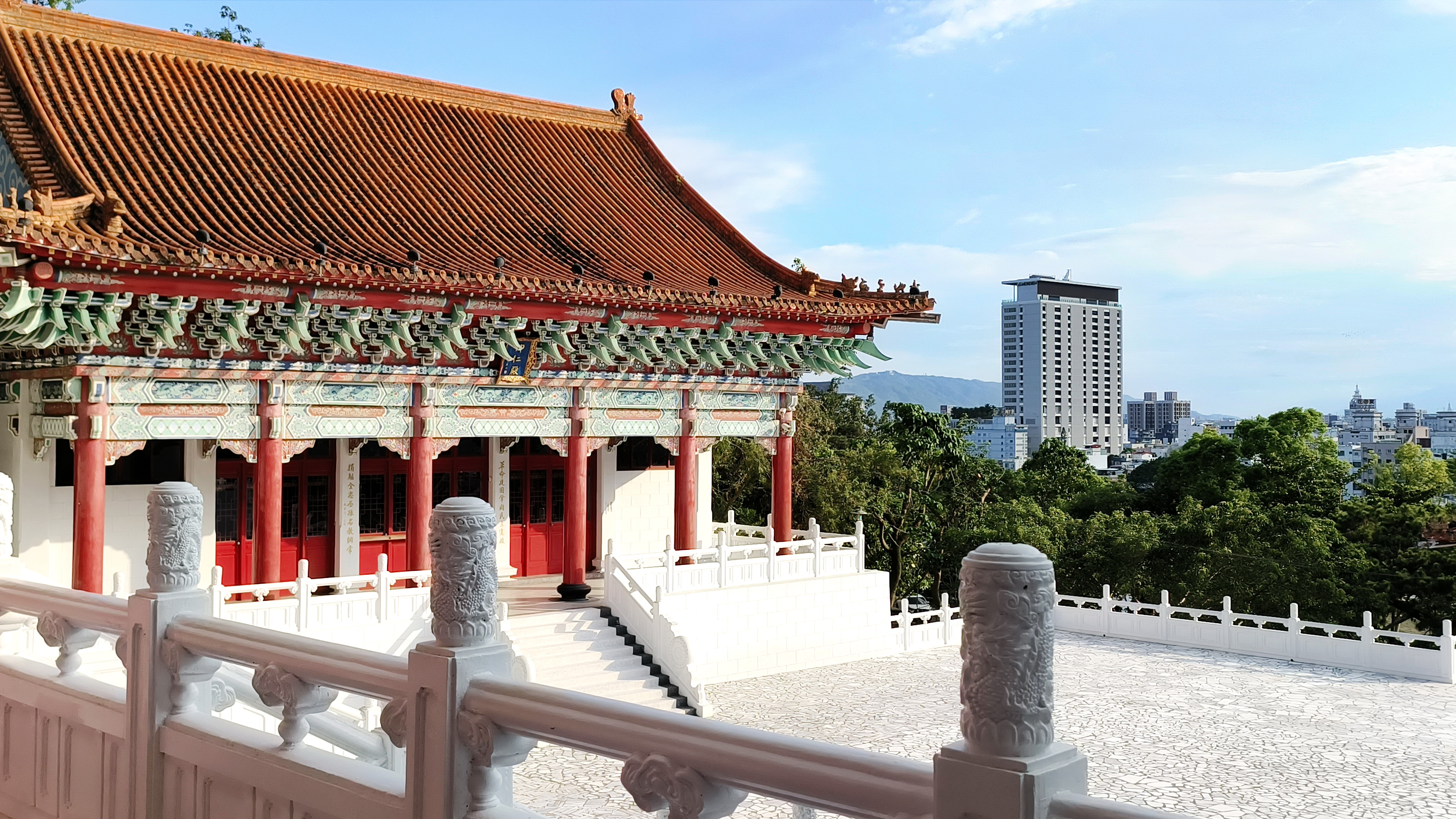
Hall of Benevolent Admiration

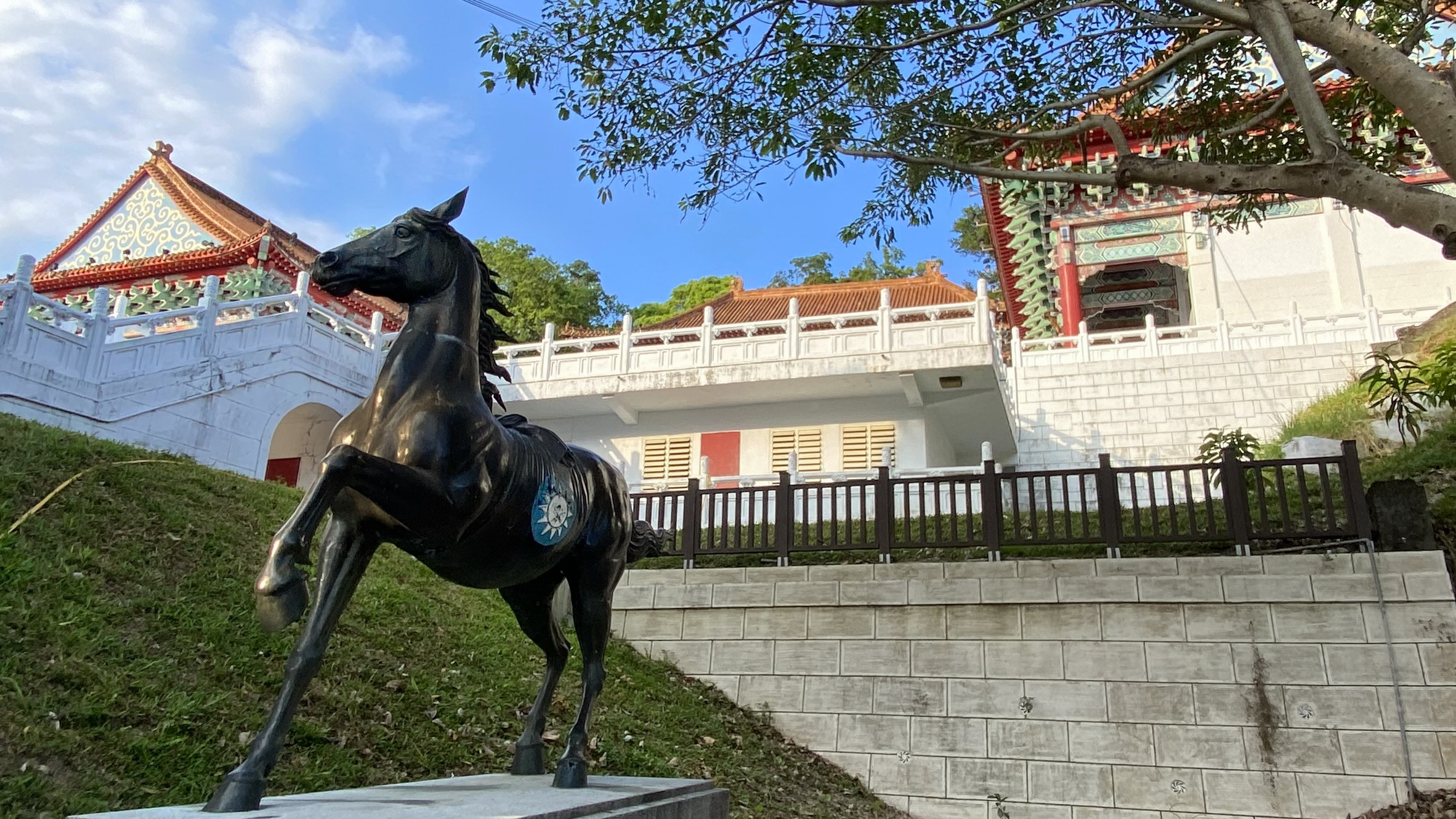
Sacred Horse

== See also ==
- Eternal Spring Shrine
- Karenkō Shrine
- Xiangde Temple
