= Mount Pingfeng =

Mountain in Xiulin, Hualien County, Taiwan

Highest point
- Elevation: 3,250 m (10,660 ft)
- Listing: Mountains in Taiwan
- Coordinates: 24°09′05.7″N 121°20′27.0″E

Naming
- Native name: 屏風山 (Chinese)

Geography
- Location: Xiulin, Hualien County, Taiwan
- Parent range: Central Mountain

The Mount Pingfeng (traditional Chinese: 屏風山; simplified Chinese: 屏风山; pinyin: Píngfēng Shān) is a mountain in Xiulin Township, Hualien County, Taiwan.

== History ==
In 2017, fluorescent directional signage, ladders, rock dowels and ropes were added to the hiking trail of the mountain.

== Geology ==
The mountain is located within the Central Mountain Range. It is the 98th tallest peak in Taiwan with its main peak reaches a height of 3,250 m.

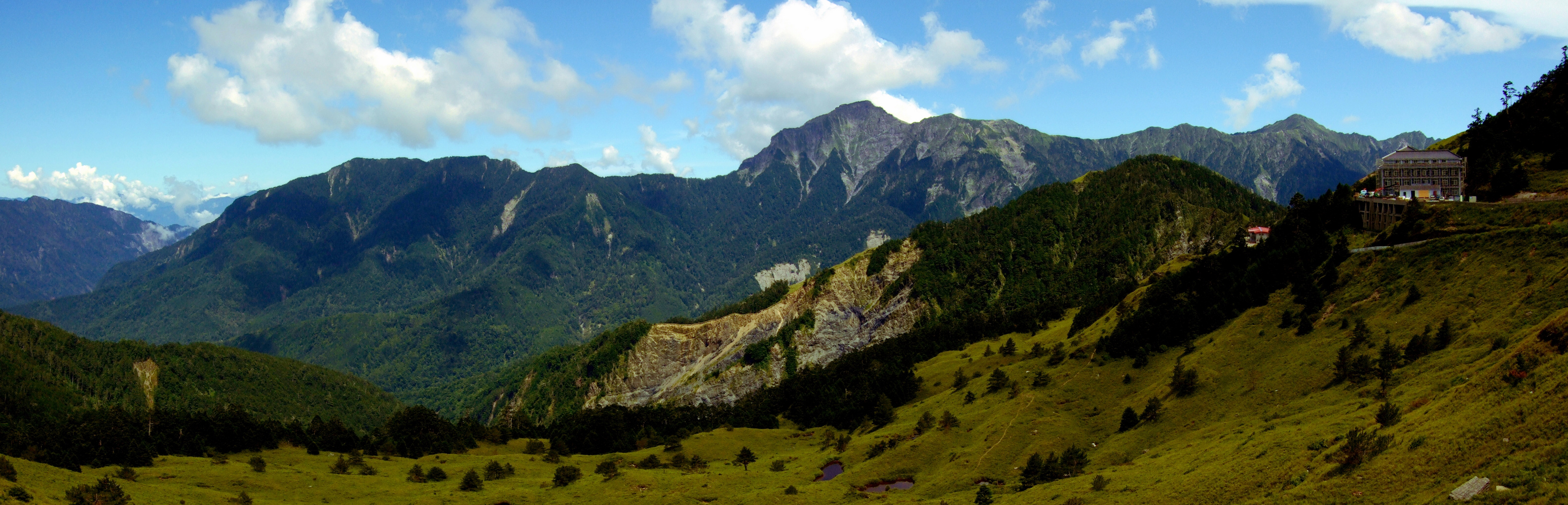
Pingfeng Mountain is to the left

== See also ==
- List of mountains in Taiwan
