= Bihai Power Plant =

Power plant in Xiulin, Hualien County, Taiwan

Bihai Power Plant 碧海發電廠
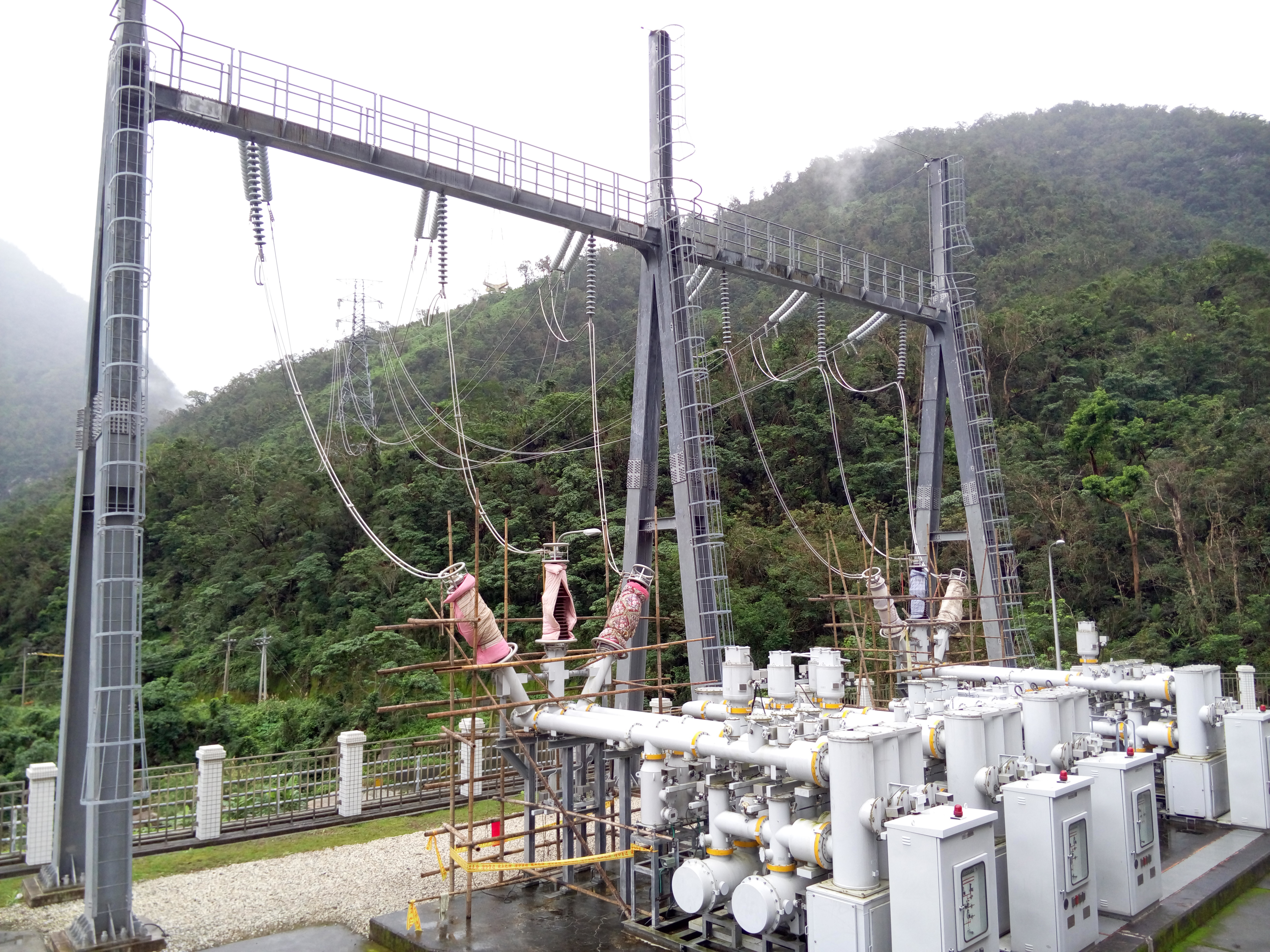
- Country: Republic of China
- Location: Xiulin, Hualien County
- Coordinates: 24°20′09″N 121°40′36″E
- Status: Operational
- Construction began: 2001
- Commission date: 10 December 2011
- Construction cost: NT$ 16.5 billion
- Owner: Taipower
- Operator: Taipower

Thermal power station
- Primary fuel: Water

Power generation
- Units operational: 1
- Make and model: Tatung Company, BHEL
- Nameplate capacity: 61.2 MW
- Annual net output: 237 GWh

External links
- Commons: Related media on Commons

The Bihai Power Plant (traditional Chinese: 碧海發電廠; simplified Chinese: 碧海发电厂; pinyin: Bìhǎi Fādiànchǎng) is a hydroelectric power plant in Xiulin Township, Hualien County, Taiwan.

== History ==
The geological survey and exploratory drilling for the project were started in 1996 and construction was started in 2001. After 15 years of preparatory and construction work, the power plant went into commercial operation on 10 December 2011.

== Dam and reservoir ==
The power plant was established from the construction of concrete gravity dam at an altitude of 545 meters along the Hoping River basin in Hualien County. The dam at (24°19′59.91″N 121°36′25.48″E) created a reservoir with a capacity of 635,000 m^{3}. An intake valve was built connecting the dam with a 6,549 meter long headrace tunnel to Bihai Power Plant located at the downstream side at an altitude of 100 meters where a vertical Pelton turbine of 61.2 MW is installed.

== Generation ==
The power plant is expected to generate 237 GWh every year to residents of Hualien County to relieve the previous burden for Taipower to import electricity from Mingtan Pumped Storage Hydro Power Plant in Nantou County and Maanshan Nuclear Power Plant in Pingtung County which was very costly. The 18 hours of daily water capture and storage will generate enough electricity to supply the six hours of peak load in the region.

== Safety ==
The power plant will open the floodgate to release excessive water during high river intensity to prevent the buildup of sediment.

== Financing ==
The project costed NT$ 16.5 billion.

== See also ==
- List of power stations in Taiwan
- Electricity sector in Taiwan
