= Seediq =

Seediq may refer to:

- Seediq people, of Taiwan
- Seediq language, their Atayalic Austronesian language
