= Xiangde Temple =

Temple in Xiulin, Hualien County, Taiwan

- 祥德寺
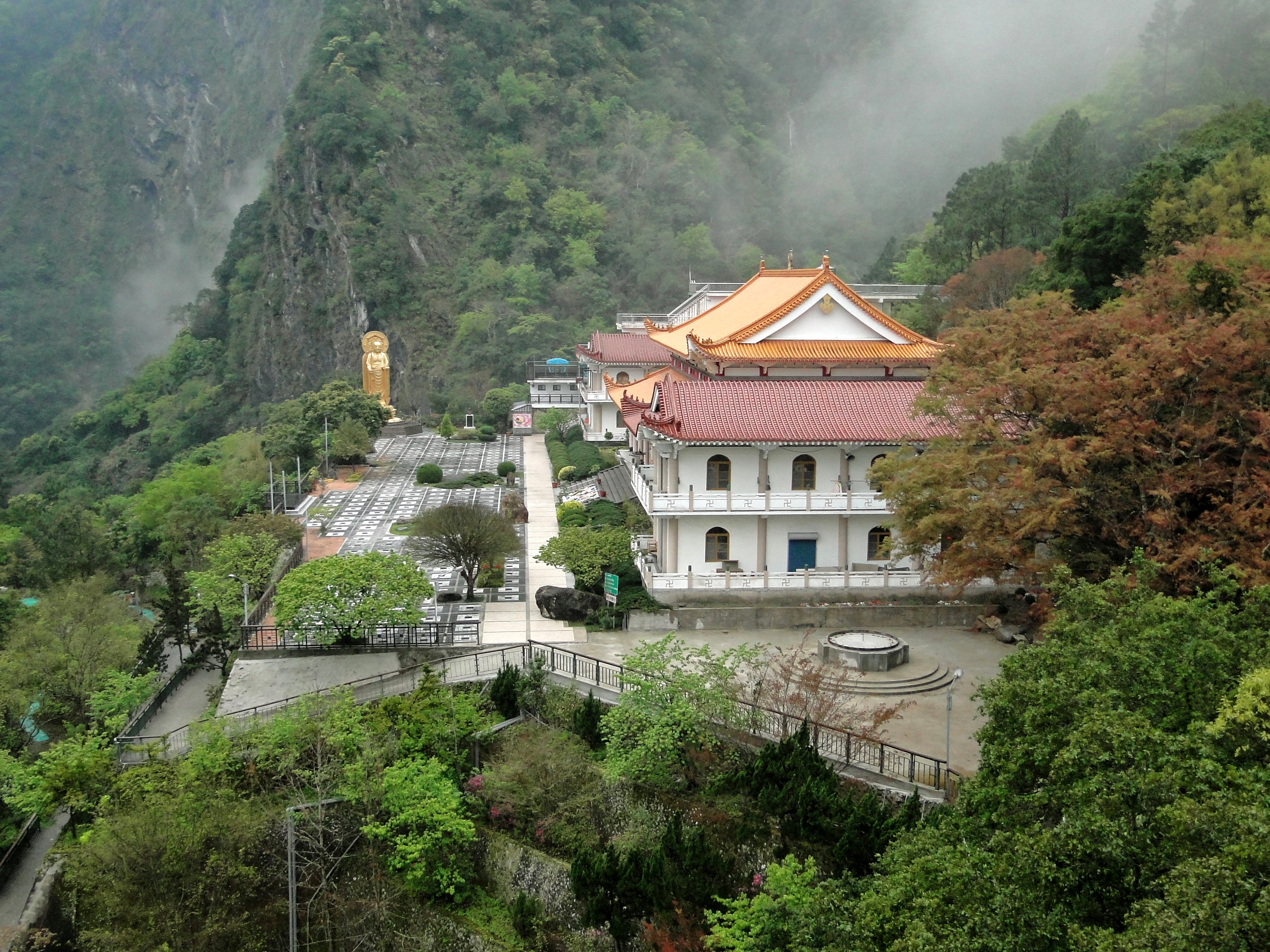

- Location within Hualien County

Location
- Location: Xiulin, Hualien County, Taiwan
- Coordinates: 24°10′45.9″N 121°29′46.1″E

Architecture
- Type: temple
- Completed: December 1968

The Xiangde Temple (Chinese: 祥德寺; pinyin: Xiángdé Sì) is a temple in Xiulin Township, Hualien County, Taiwan.

== History ==
After the opening of Central Cross-Island Highway, the main temple was completed in December 1968. The Daxiong Boudian, Tianfeng Pagoda and the White Robed Guanyin were then successively built.

== Architecture ==
The temple resembles the shape of lotus surrounded by mountains around it.

== See also ==
- Buddhism in Taiwan
- Religion in Taiwan
- List of temples in Taiwan
