= Taroko Bus =

Bus company in Taiwan

Taroko Bus Traffic CO., LTD.
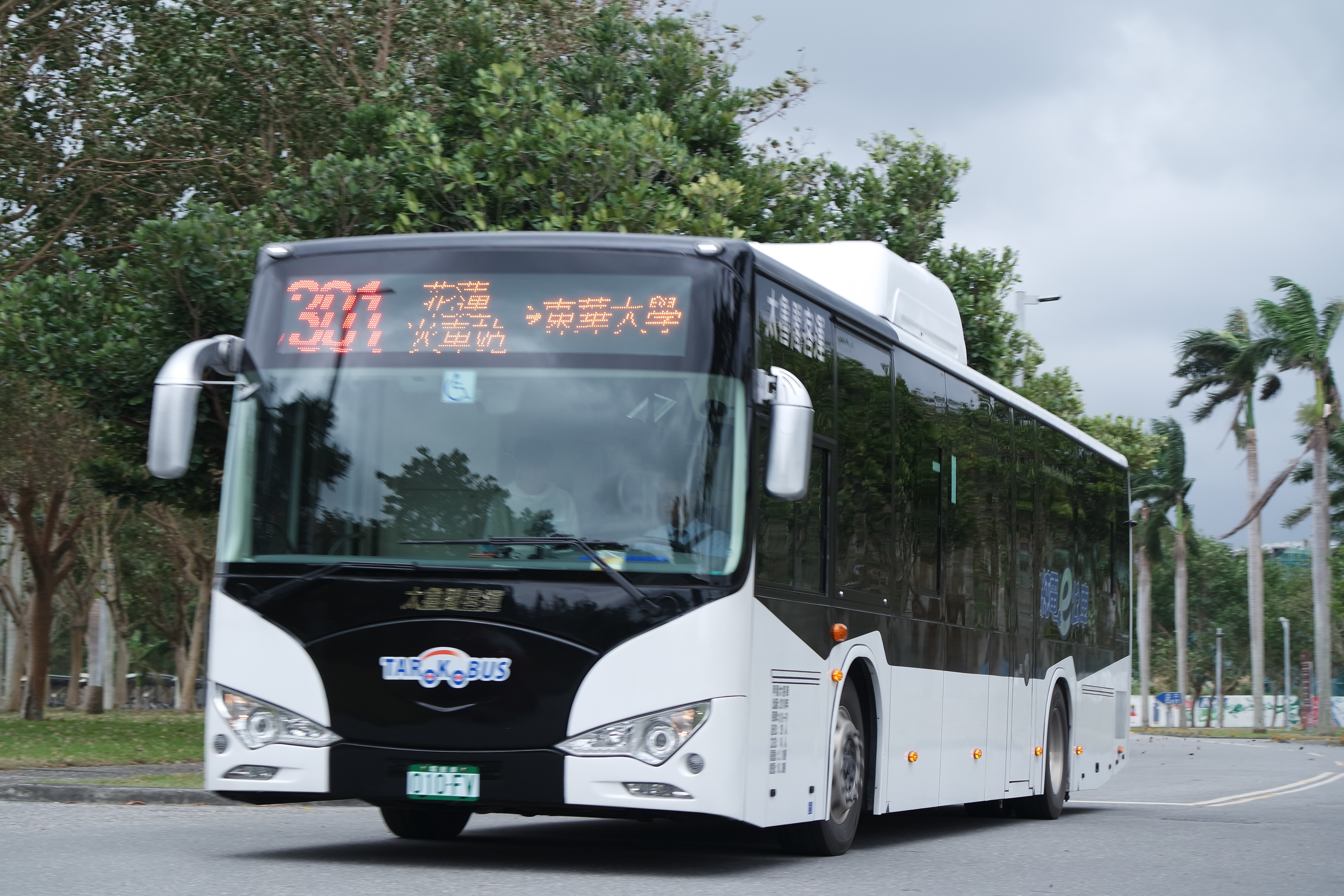
- Native name: 太魯閣汽車客運股份有限公司
- Type: Cooperated
- Industry: Transportation
- Founded: 13 June 2014
- Headquarters: Hualien County, Taiwan
- Key people: CEO:蘇上泳

Taroko Bus (Chinese: 太魯閣客運; pinyin: Tàilǔgé Kèyùn) is a bus company serving northern Hualien County, Taiwan. The company is founded in June, 2013, which became the first full-electric bus operator in Taiwan. At the beginning, it launched its first route no.301, which operates between Hualien Station and National Dong Hua University.

== Rolling Stock ==
=== BYD K9 ===
- Manufacturer: BYD
- Engine:
- Manufactured in: 2016

=== KINGLONG KL5850L ===
- Manufacturer:
- Engine: Cummins
- Manufactured in: 2018

=== Toyota Coaster ===
- Manufacturer: Toyota
- Engine: Toyota
- Manufactured in: 2025

== Routes ==
Route	Start	End	Note
301	Hualien Station	National Dong Hwa University	Low-floor bus
302	Xincheng Station	Tianxiang	
