= Hot potassium carbonate =

Method used to remove carbon dioxide from gas mixtures

Hot potassium carbonate, HPC, is a method used to remove carbon dioxide from gas mixtures, in some contexts referred to as carbon scrubbing. The inorganic, basic compound potassium carbonate is mixed with a gas mixture and the liquid absorbs carbon dioxide through chemical processes. The technology is a form of chemical absorption, and was developed for natural gas sweetening (i.e., removal of acidic from raw natural gas). Currently it is also considered, among others, as a post-combustion capture process, in the contexts of carbon capture and storage and carbon capture and utilization.As a post-combustion CO_{2} capture process, the technology is planned to be used at full scale at a heat plant in Stockholm, involving hot potassium carbonate-based carbon capture technology supplied by Capsol Technologies, including integrated heat recovery.
