= Taiwan Cement =

Cement company of Taiwan

Taiwan Cement Corporation
- Native name: 台灣水泥
- Company type: Public
- Traded as: TWSE: 1101
- Industry: cement
- Founded: 1 May 1946
- Headquarters: Zhongshan, Taipei, Taiwan
- Area served: Taiwan
- Revenue: NT$116,099,000,000 (2013)
- Operating income: NT$18,604,000,000 (2013)
- Net income: NT$15,118,000,000 (2013)
- Website: Official website

The Taiwan Cement Corporation (TCC; traditional Chinese: 台灣水泥; simplified Chinese: 台湾水泥; pinyin: Táiwān Shuǐní) founded by Koo Chen-fu, The Koo Family, is a cement company headquartered in Taiwan. Their main business includes the production and trading of cement, paper bags, and other paper products, under the "品牌水泥" namebrand.

They are the central component of TCC Group, which grew from the cement plant.

== History ==
After the handover of Taiwan from Japan to the Republic of China in 1945, the Taiwan Provincial Government and Ministry of Economics Resource Committee jointly incorporated the Taiwan Cement Limited Corporation on 1 May 1946. On 1 January 1951, the company was restructured as Taiwan Cement Corporation.

On 11 November 1954, the state owned company was privatized and became a publicly listed corporation, and the Lukang Gu (Koo) family took over the management. In 1962, the stock was listed under the code 1101, making it the first listed company in Taiwan.

The company diversified, with the cement industry remaining at its core, and became the TCC Group. The TCC Group affiliates include: TCC Green Energy, Hong Kong Cement, Wanqing Cement, Fengsheng Industrial, Guanghe Refractory, Shimin Engineering, Heping Harbor, Dongcheng Quarry, Heping Power, Dahe Environmental Services, Dahe Changbei Environmental Protection, Dahe Dafeng Environmental Protection, Taiwan Express Warehousing, Dahe Shipping, Xinchang Chemical, TCC Chemical, TCC Int'l Ltd., Taiwan Guanghe Construction, TCC Information, Xinchang Investment, Fortune Products Investment, China Rubber International, Nengyuan Technology, and others.

== Chairmen ==
- Koo Chen-fu
- Chester Koo (until 2001) - son of Koo Chen-fu
- Leslie Koo (2003–2017) - son of Koo Chen-fu
- Nelson Chang (2017–present) - interim Chairman and brother-in-law of Leslie Koo

== Head Office ==
The company headquarter (Taiwan Cement Building) is accessible within walking distance south west from Zhongshan Elementary School Station of Taipei Metro at 113 Zhongshan Road North Section 2. The building was completed in 2002 by Taiwanese architect M. L. Kuo.

== See also ==
- List of companies of Taiwan
