= Xiulin, Hualien =

Xiulin Township 秀林鄉 Sioulin
- Mountain indigenous township
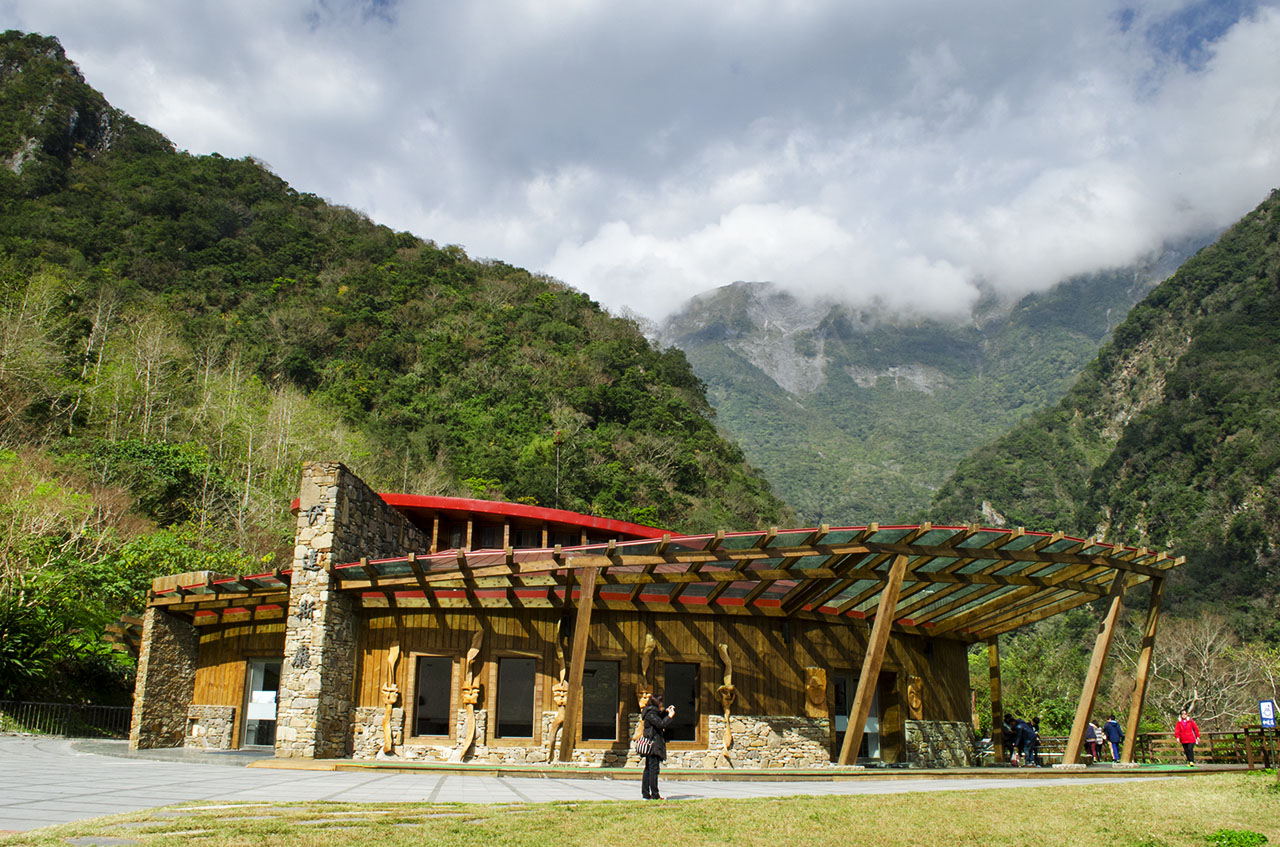
- Buluowan in Taroko National Park

- Location within Taiwan
- Coordinates: 24°13′00″N 121°32′00″E
- Country: Taiwan
- Region: Eastern Taiwan

Government
  - Type: Township

Area
  - Total: 1,641.8555 km^{2} (633.9240 sq mi)

Population (February 2023)
  - Total: 17,068
  - Density: 9.201/km^{2} (23.83/sq mi)
- Time zone: UTC+8 (CST)
- Post code: 972
- Subdivision: 9 villages, 128 neighborhoods
- Website: www.shlin.gov.tw

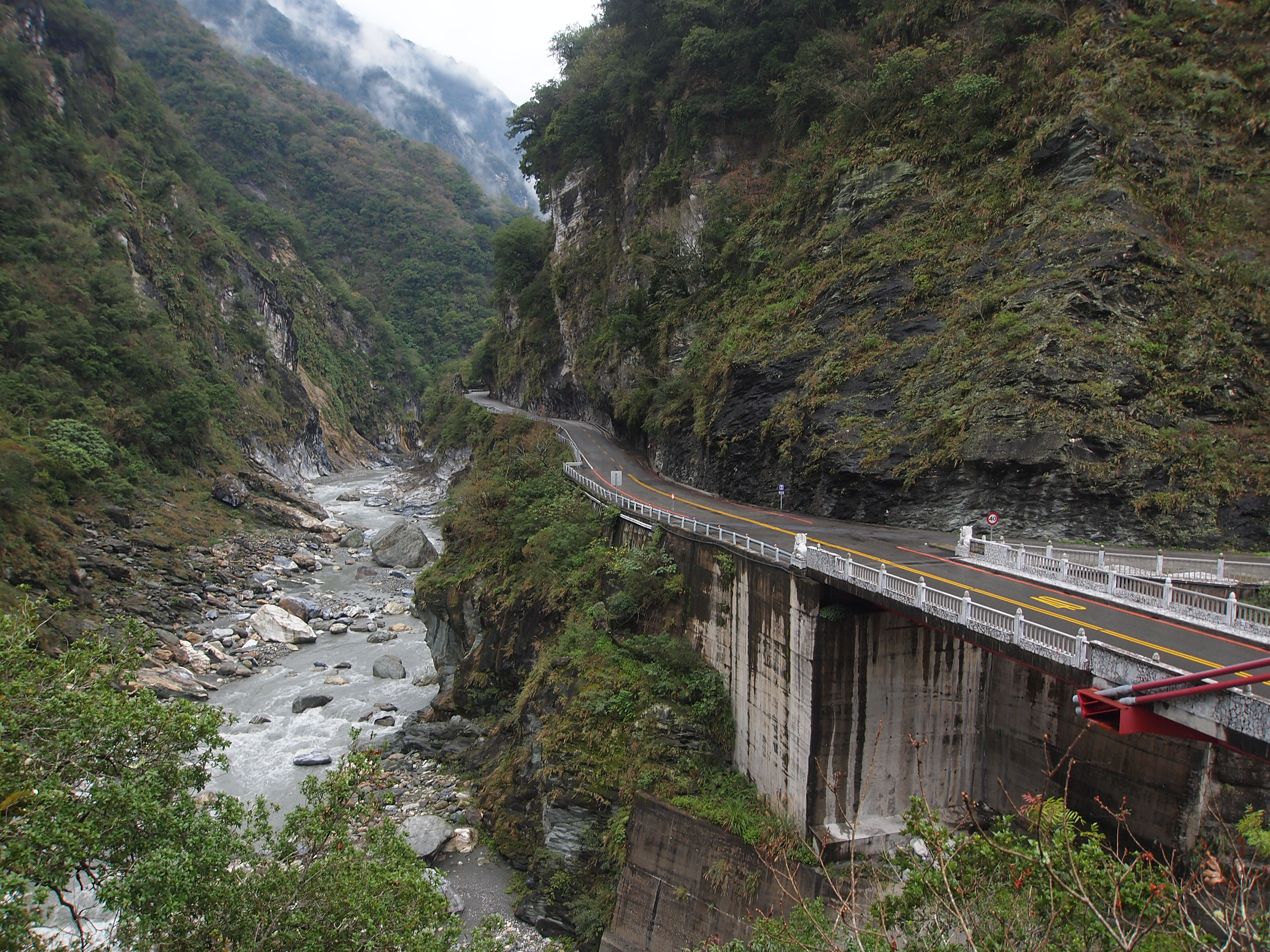
The Central Cross-Island Highway

Xiulin Township / Sioulin Township (Chinese: 秀林鄉; Hanyu Pinyin: Xiùlín Xiāng; Tongyong Pinyin: Siòulín Siang) is a mountain indigenous township of Hualien County, Taiwan. It is located northwest of Hualien City, and is the largest township in Taiwan by area (1,641.86 km²) with 9 villages. It has a population of 17,068, most of which are the indigenous Taroko people.

Because of its location beside the Central Mountain Range, the climate changes by altitude. Taroko National Park is located in Xiulin Township. In recent years, people in Xiulin have lobbied to change its name to "Taroko Township" (太魯閣鄉).

The second deadliest train disaster in Taiwan's history happened here in 2021.

== Administrative divisions ==
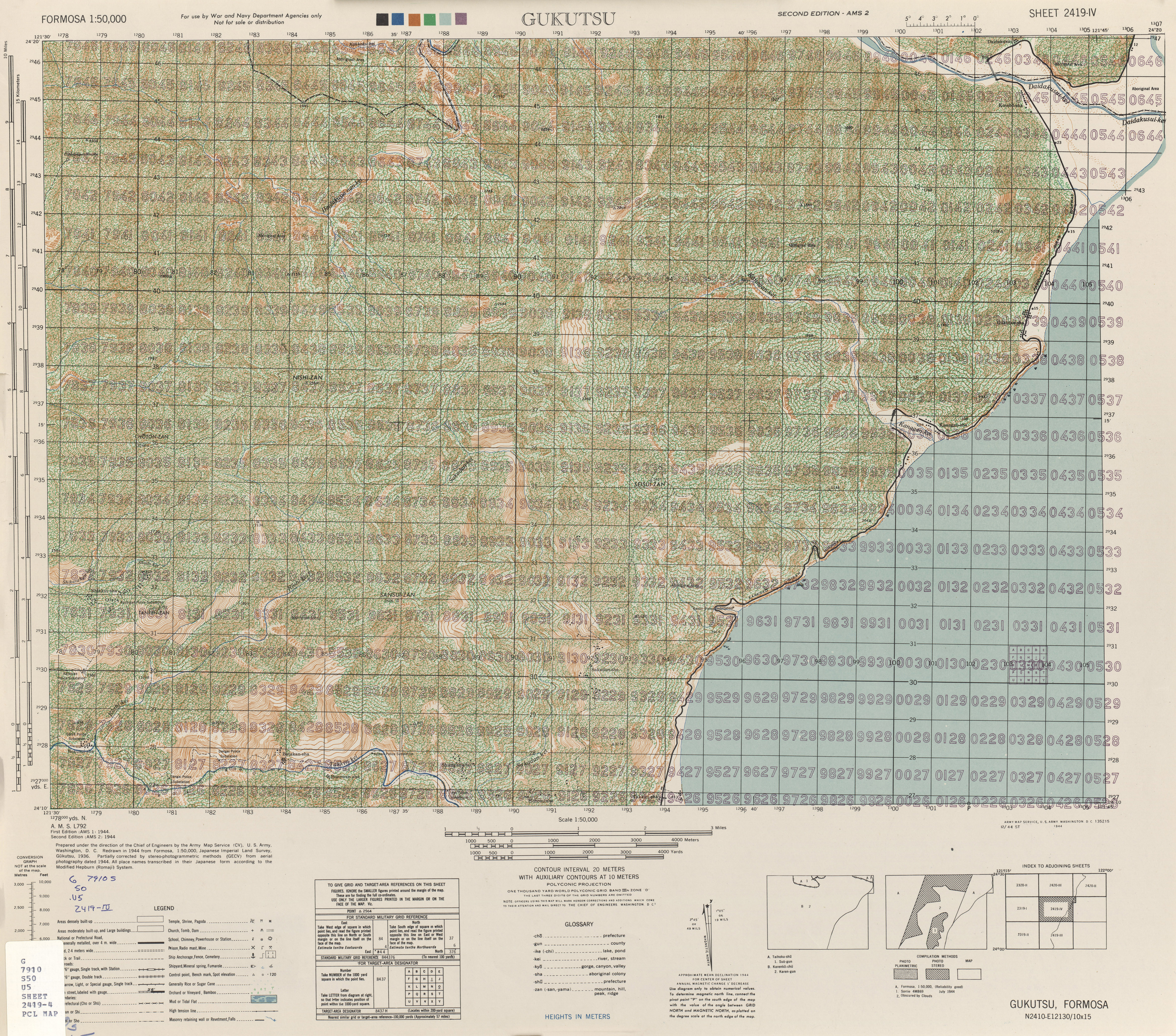
Map of northeastern Xiulin area (1944)

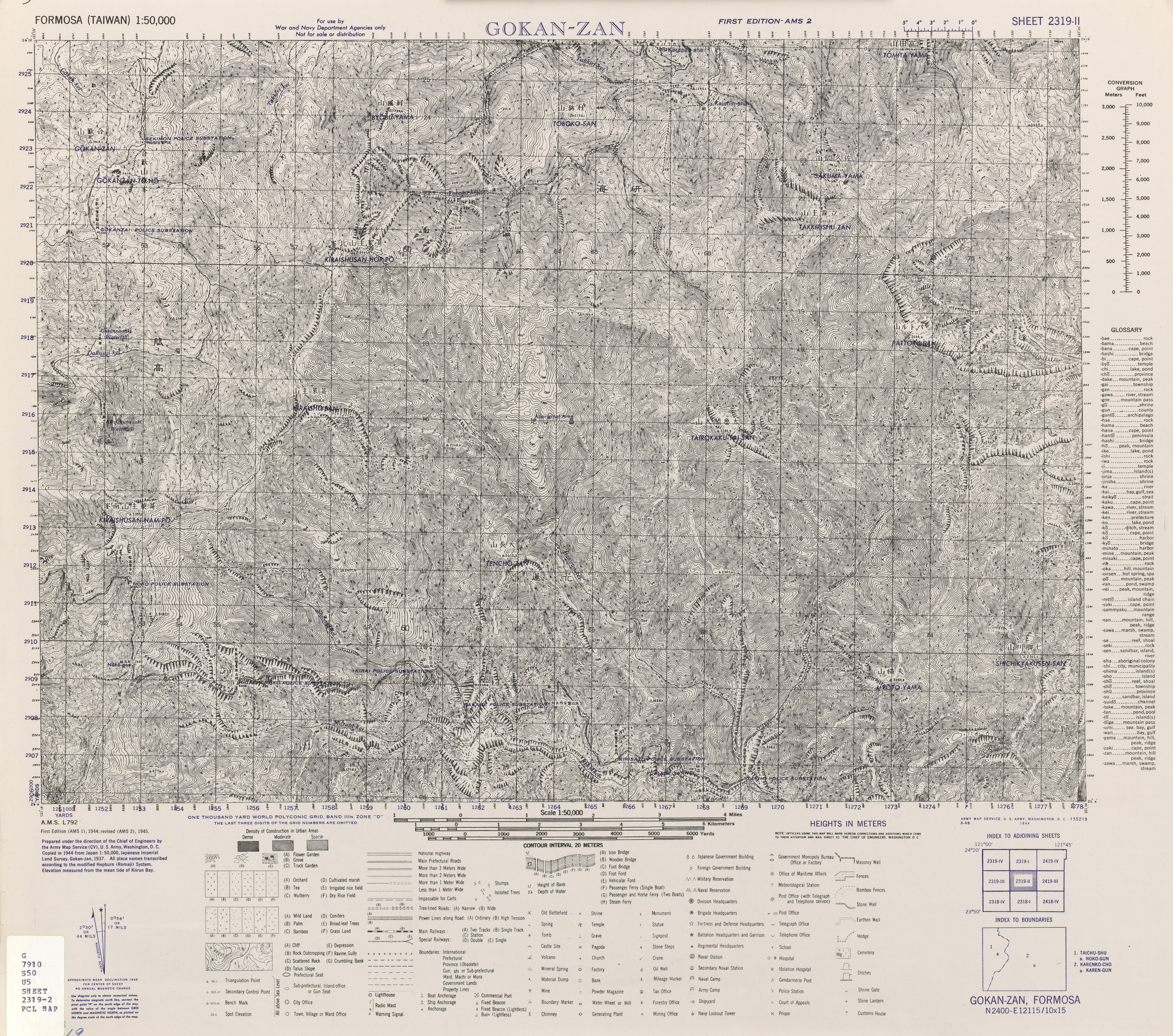
Map of southwestern Xiulin area (1944)

The township comprises nine villages: Chongde, Fushi, Heping, Jiamin, Jingmei, Shuiyuan, Tongmen, Wenlan and Xiulin.

== Tourist attractions ==
- Taroko National Park
- Qingshui Cliff
- Sanchan Creek Scenic Area
- Mukumugi ecological Trail and preserve area
- Kilai Mountain (3607 m)
- Dayu Mountain (2565 m)
- Hehuanshan (3416 m)
- Pingfeng Mountain
- Xiangde Temple
- Shimen Mountain
- Wuming Mountain

== Infrastructure ==
- Bihai Power Plant
- Hoping Power Plant

== Transportation ==
- TR Heping Station, Heren Station, Jingmei Station, Chongde Station (North-link line)
- Provincial Highway 8 (Central Cross-Island Highway)
- Provincial Highway 9 (Suhua Highway)
- Heping Cement Port
