= Hualien County =

County of Taiwan

Hualien County 花蓮縣
- County
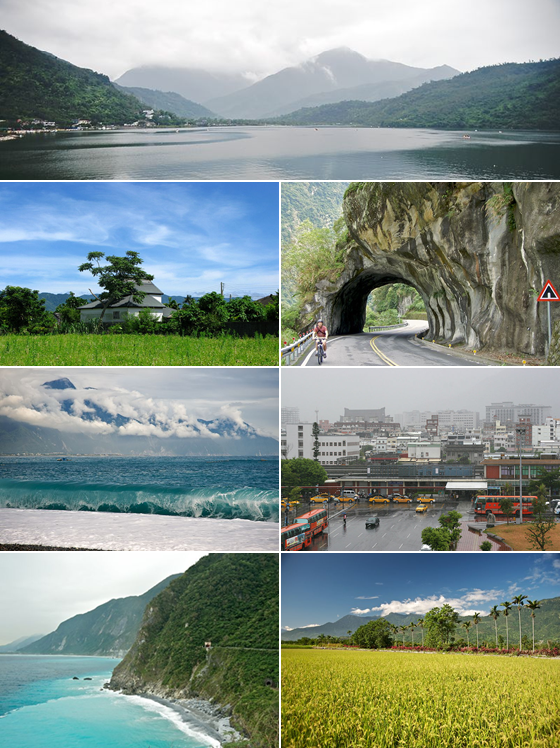
- Clockwise, from top: Liyu Lake; a section of the Cross Island Highway in Taroko Gorge National Park; Hualien Railroad Station; a paddy field in Shoufeng with a Central Mountain Range backdrop; Qingshui Cliffs near Suhua Highway; Qixingtan Beach in Xincheng; a cigarette production house in Fenglin

- Flag Logo

- Coordinates: 23°58′34″N 121°36′17″E
- Country: Republic of China (Taiwan)
- Region: Eastern Taiwan
- Seat: Hualien City
- Largest city: Hualien City
- Boroughs: 1 cities, 12 (2 urban, 10 rural) townships

Government
  - County Magistrate: Hsu Chen-wei (KMT)

Area
  - Total: 4,628.5714 km^{2} (1,787.1014 sq mi)
  - Rank: 1 of 22

Population (March 2023)
  - Total: 318,736
  - Rank: 20 of 22
  - Density: 68.8627/km^{2} (178.354/sq mi)
- Time zone: UTC+8 (National Standard Time)
- ISO 3166 code: TW-HUA
- Website: www.hl.gov.tw
- Symbols
- Bird: Maroon Oriole (Oriolus traillii)
- Flower: Lotus (Nymphaeaceae)
- Tree: Peepul (Ficus religiosa)

Hualien County
- Traditional Chinese: 花蓮縣
Transcriptions
Standard Mandarin
- Hanyu Pinyin: Huālián Xiàn
- Bopomofo: ㄏㄨㄚ ㄌㄧㄢˊ ㄒㄧㄢˋ
- Gwoyeu Romatzyh: Hualian Shiann
- Wade–Giles: Hua¹-lien² Hsien⁴
- Tongyong Pinyin: Hualián Siàn
- Yale Romanization: Hwālyán Syàn
- MPS2: Huālián Shiàn
- IPA: [xwá.ljɛ̌n ɕjɛ̂n]
Hakka
- Pha̍k-fa-sṳ: Fâ-lièn-yen
Southern Min
- Hokkien POJ: Hoa-lian-koān or Hoa-liân-koān
- Tâi-lô: Hua-lian-kuān or Hua-liân-kuān

Hualien (Note: In local languages: Traditional Chinese script: 花蓮縣; Mandarin Pinyin: Huālián Xiàn; Hokkien: Hoa-lian-koān or Hoa-liân-koān; Sixian Hakka: Fâ-lièn-yen; Amis: Kalingko) (Wade–Giles: Hua¹-lien²) is a county on the east coast of Taiwan. It is Taiwan's largest county by area, yet due to its mountainous terrain, has one of the lowest populations in the country. The county seat and largest city is Hualien City. Hualien County is located in the eastern part of Taiwan—the Pacific Ocean lies to its east and the Central Mountain Range lies to its west. Narrow and long, Hualien is the largest county in Taiwan in terms of area.

Most of its population resides in the Huadong Valley, which runs north to south between the Central and Hai'an mountain ranges. Hualien's natural environment attracts many visitors and some of its natural attractions include Taroko Gorge, Qingshui Cliff, and Qixingtan Beach.

Much of modern-day Hualien County was populated by the Sakizaya people before the arrival of the Spanish, Dutch, and Han Chinese under Qing annexation. The region was renamed Karenkō Prefecture in 1895 during Japanese colonial rule. In 1945, after the end of World War II, the Republic of China took control of Taiwan and renamed the former Karenkō Prefecture as Hualien County of Taiwan Province. Taiwan Province would be reorganized once again in 1998 and Hualien County fell under the direct jurisdiction of the Executive Yuan.

As of February 2023, Hualien's organic cultivation area was 3,175 hectares (7,850 acres), the largest of any county in the country. Hualien is the largest organic agricultural production base in Taiwan.

== History ==
=== Early history ===
Modern-day Hualien City was originally called Kilai (Chinese: 奇萊; Pe̍h-ōe-jī: Kî-lâi), after the Sakizaya Taiwanese indigenous peoples' settlement.

Spanish settlers arrived in 1622 to pan for gold. Picking up the sounds of native words, these settlers called the area Turumoan (多羅滿; To-lô-boán). Han Chinese settlers arrived in 1851. Qing dynasty records give the name of the region as Huilan (洄瀾; Hoê-liân; 'eddies') due to the whirling of waters in the delta.

=== Empire of Japan ===
During Taiwan's Japanese colonial period (1895–1945) the island's Japanese governors opted not to transliterate the name "Kiray" because the Japanese pronunciation of the word resembled the Japanese word for "dislike, disgusting" (嫌い, kirai). The official name became Karenkō (花蓮港, Karenkō). Karenkō Prefecture consisted of modern-day Hualien County. Toward the end of World War II the Governor-General of Taiwan moved many Japanese residents of Taiwan to the area to develop agriculture. The county was named after lotus flowers.

=== Republic of China ===
After the handover of Taiwan from Japan to the Republic of China in October 1945, Hualien was established as a county named Hualien County of Taiwan Province on 9 January 1946. In 1951, Hualien was the first county in Taiwan to be governed according to the ROC local autonomy law. Today the Hualien area serves as the key population center on the east coast it is one of the five main 'life circle' regions in Taiwan, together with Taipei, Taichung, Tainan and Kaohsiung.

=== 2021 train derailment ===
On 2 April 2021, a Taroko Express derailed at the north entrance of Qingshui Tunnel after striking an unattended flatbed truck that had fallen onto the tracks. The incident is the deadliest train accident in Taiwan since 1948, with at least 50 passengers reported dead and more than 150 injured.

=== 2025 severe flooding ===
On September 23, 2025, severe flooding caused by Typhoon Ragasa left 19 people dead and 5 missing. The Taiwanese government stated that each family that suffered from the flooding would obtain at least 50,000 Taiwanese dollars (approximately 1,800 USD) in compensation.

== Geography ==
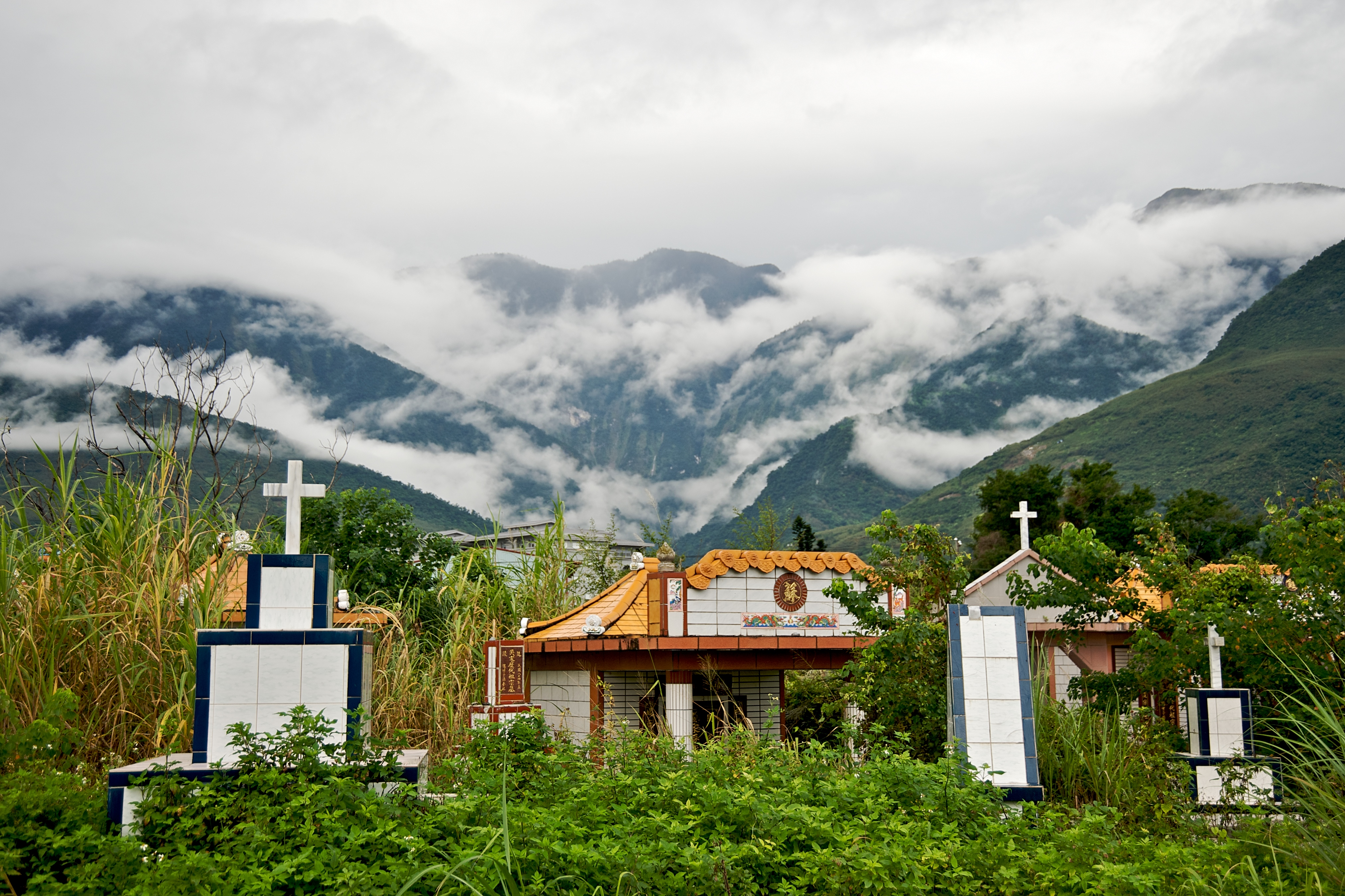
Central Mountain Range

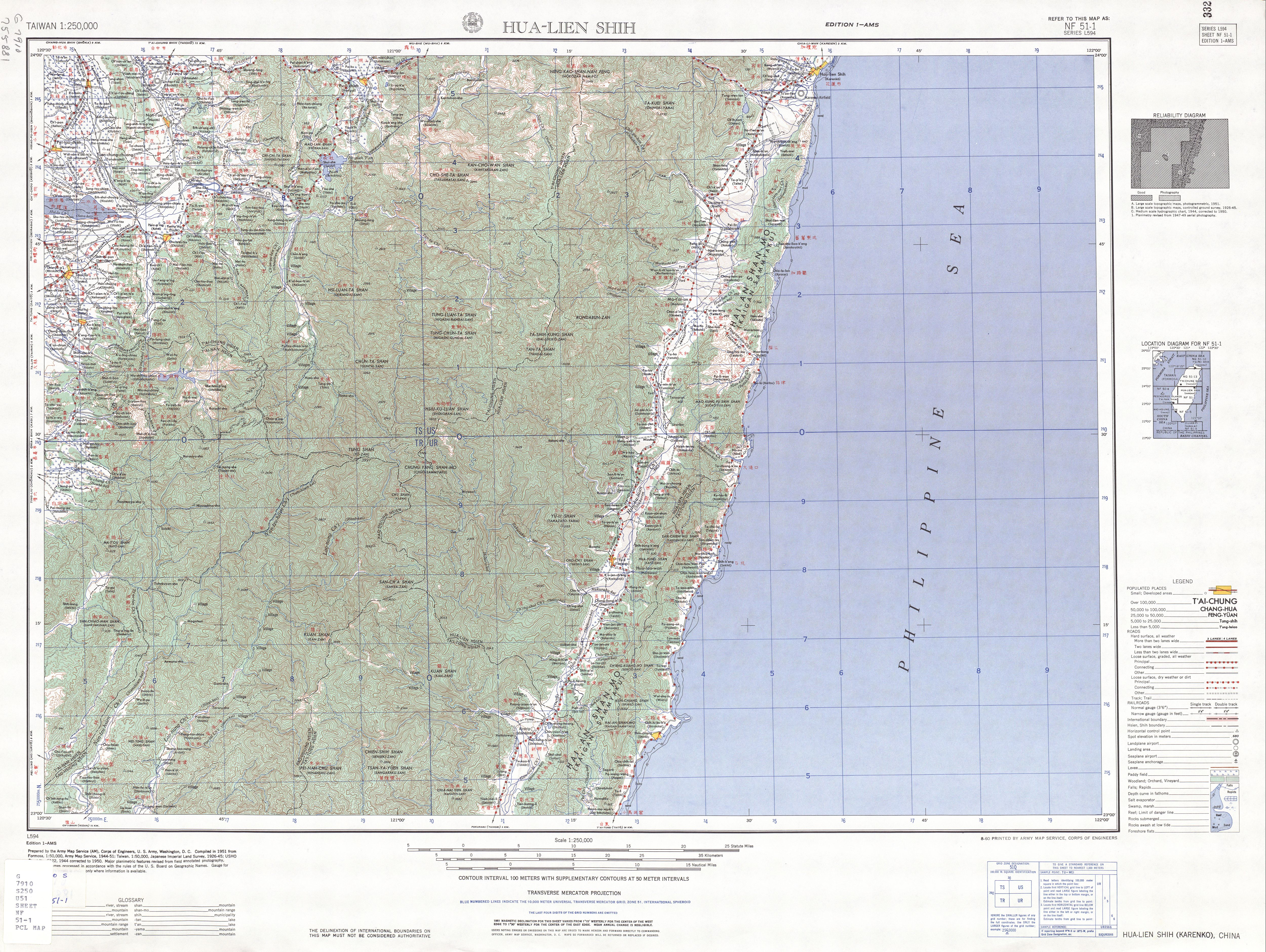
Hualien (1951)

Hualien County is situated in eastern Taiwan. It faces the Pacific Ocean with Japan (Okinawa Prefecture) lying to its east, the Central Mountain Range, Taichung City, Nantou County, and Kaohsiung City to its west, Yilan County to the north, and Taitung County to the south. It stretches around 137.5 km (85.4 mi) from north to south, with its east-west width ranging from 27 to 43 km (17 to 27 mi). Its area is about 4,628.57 km^{2} (1,787.10 sq mi), approximately an eighth of Taiwan's total area.

Despite its vast area, only 7% of the county area is populated. The remaining area is occupied by rivers (7%) and mountains (87%). Prominent mountain ranges include the Central Mountain Range in the west and the Hai'an Range in the east. The main rivers in the county include the Hualian River and Xiuguluan River and their branches. Subtropical plains, with a mean width around 3–6 km (1.9–3.7 mi), dominate the valleys between both mountain ranges. Due to the inhospitable nature of the surrounding mountainous terrain, Hualien people reside mostly on the alluvial fans of the Huatung Valley plains.

== Government ==
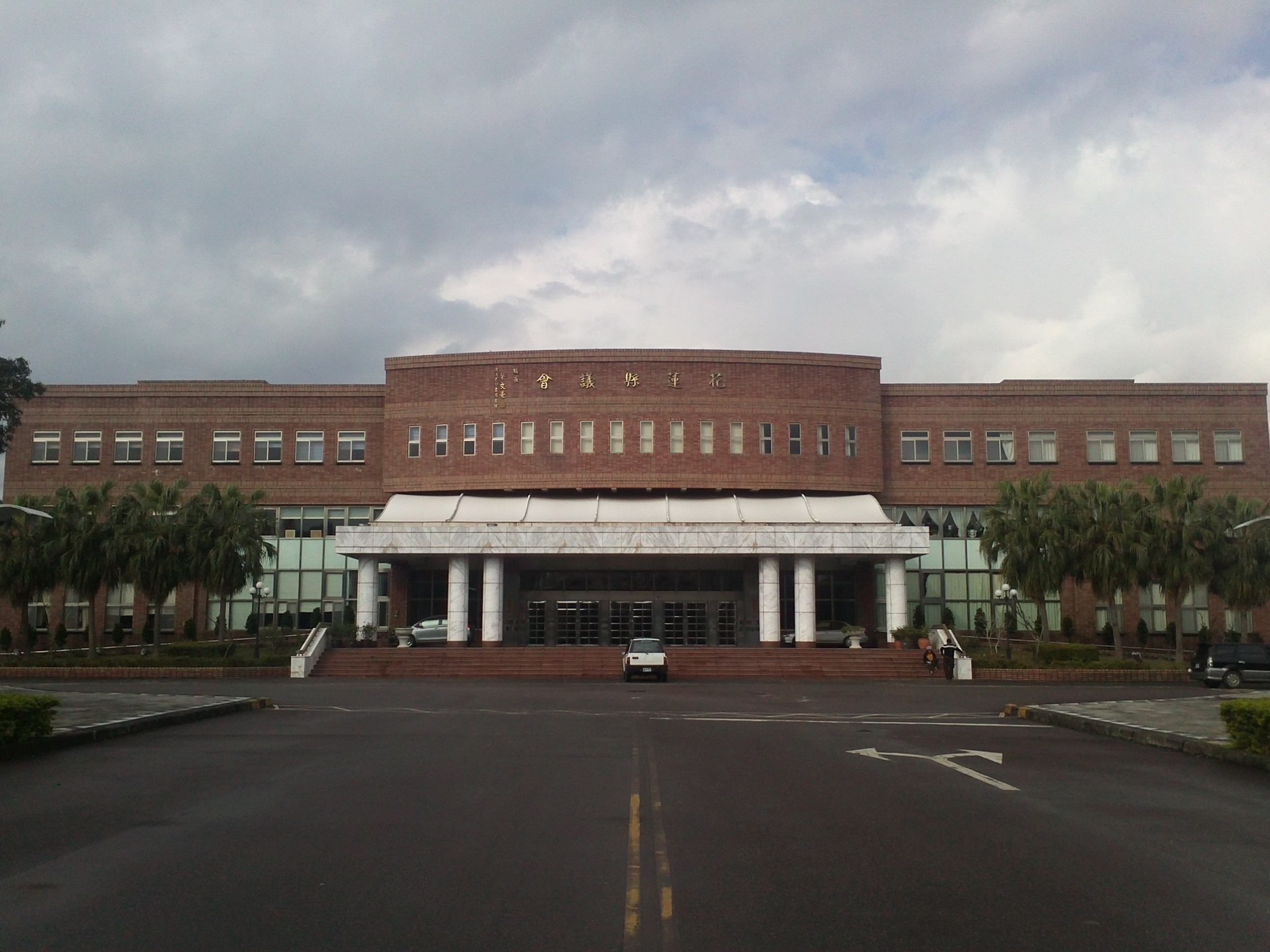
Hualien County Council

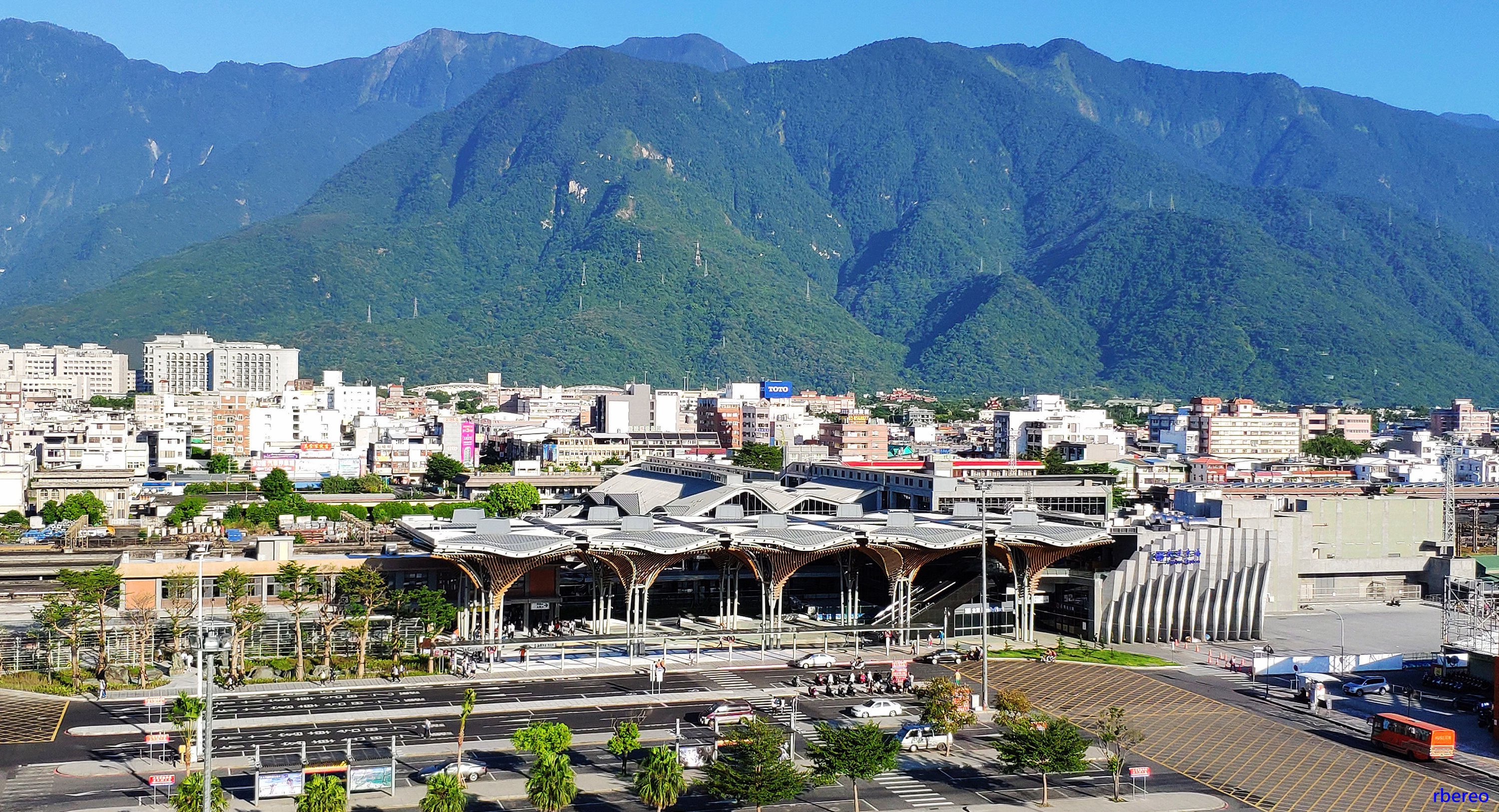
Hualien City, the county seat of Hualien County.

=== Administrative divisions ===
Hualien County is divided into one city, two urban townships, seven rural townships, and three mountain indigenous townships. Some towns have Japanese names because these towns were named by Japanese during the Japanese ruling period from 1895 to 1945. Hualien City is the county seat and houses the Hualien County Government and Hualien County Council.

Type	Name	Chinese	Taiwanese POJ	Hakka	Formosan	Japanese Origin
City	Hualien City	花蓮市	Hoa-lian or Hoa-liân	Fâ-lièn	Kalinko^{Amis}, Nabakuwan^{Sakizaya}	Karenkō (花蓮港)
Urban townships	Fenglin	鳳林鎮	Hōng-lîm	Fung-lìm	Marlimu^{Amis}	
Urban townships	Yuli	玉里鎮	Gio̍k-lí	Ngiu̍k-lî	Posko^{Amis}	Tamasato (玉里)
Rural townships	Fengbin	豐濱鄉	Hong-pin	Fûng-pîn	Fakong^{Amis}, Bakung^{Kavalan}	Toyohama (豊浜)
Rural townships	Fuli	富里鄉	Hù-lí	Fu-lî	Kongpo^{Amis}	Tomisato (富里)
Rural townships	Guangfu	光復鄉	Kong-ho̍k	Kông-fu̍k	Fata'an^{Amis}	
Rural townships	Ji'an	吉安鄉	Kiat-an	Kit-ôn	Cikasuan^{Amis}	Yoshino (吉野)
Rural townships	Ruisui	瑞穗鄉	Sūi-sūi or Sūi-hūi	Lui-sui	Kohkoh^{Amis}	Mizuho (瑞穂)
Rural townships	Shoufeng	壽豐鄉	Siū-hong	Su-fûng	Ciamengan^{Amis}	Kotobuki (寿)
Rural townships	Xincheng	新城鄉	Sin-siâⁿ	Sîn-sàng	Sinjiyu^{Truku}, Takidis^{Amis}	
Mountain indigenous townships	Wanrong	萬榮鄉	Bān-êng	Van-yùng	Malibasi^{Truku}	
Mountain indigenous townships	Xiulin (Sioulin)	秀林鄉	Siù-lîm	Siu-lìm	Bsuring^{Truku}	
Mountain indigenous townships	Zhuoxi	卓溪鄉	Toh-khe	Cho̍k-hâi	Takkei^{Bunun}	

Colors indicate the common language status of Hakka and Formosan languages within each division.

=== Politics ===
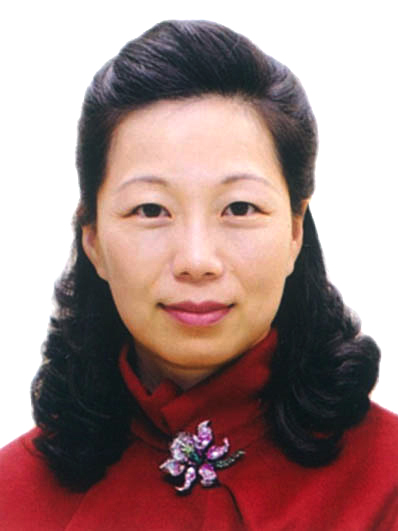
Hsu Chen-wei, the incumbent Magistrate of Hualien County.

Hualien County voted one Kuomintang legislator to be in the Legislative Yuan during the 2022 Taiwanese local elections. The incumbent Magistrate of the county is Hsu Chen-wei of the Kuomintang.

== Climate ==
Hualien has a tropical monsoon climate (Am under the Köppen climate classification).

Climate data for Hualien City (1991–2020 average)
Month	Jan	Feb	Mar	Apr	May	Jun	Jul	Aug	Sep	Oct	Nov	Dec	Year
Record high °C (°F)	29.6 (85.3)	30.6 (87.1)	31.2 (88.2)	33.6 (92.5)	34.3 (93.7)	34.7 (94.5)	36.3 (97.3)	37.4 (99.3)	35.2 (95.4)	37.0 (98.6)	32.3 (90.1)	29.6 (85.3)	37.4 (99.3)
Mean daily maximum °C (°F)	21.4 (70.5)	21.9 (71.4)	23.6 (74.5)	26.2 (79.2)	28.7 (83.7)	30.9 (87.6)	32.4 (90.3)	32.2 (90.0)	30.7 (87.3)	28.3 (82.9)	25.8 (78.4)	22.8 (73.0)	27.1 (80.7)
Daily mean °C (°F)	18.3 (64.9)	18.6 (65.5)	20.3 (68.5)	22.8 (73.0)	25.3 (77.5)	27.3 (81.1)	28.7 (83.7)	28.4 (83.1)	27.0 (80.6)	24.9 (76.8)	22.5 (72.5)	19.7 (67.5)	23.7 (74.6)
Mean daily minimum °C (°F)	15.8 (60.4)	16.2 (61.2)	17.6 (63.7)	20.1 (68.2)	22.5 (72.5)	24.7 (76.5)	25.6 (78.1)	25.4 (77.7)	24.2 (75.6)	22.2 (72.0)	19.9 (67.8)	17.2 (63.0)	21.0 (69.7)
Record low °C (°F)	4.6 (40.3)	4.4 (39.9)	8.7 (47.7)	9.6 (49.3)	14.6 (58.3)	16.8 (62.2)	20.1 (68.2)	19.8 (67.6)	16.9 (62.4)	12.5 (54.5)	8.1 (46.6)	6.5 (43.7)	4.4 (39.9)
Average precipitation mm (inches)	54.6 (2.15)	74.7 (2.94)	76.7 (3.02)	76.6 (3.02)	186.9 (7.36)	165.5 (6.52)	198.5 (7.81)	258.8 (10.19)	329.9 (12.99)	350.6 (13.80)	175.1 (6.89)	83.6 (3.29)	2,031.5 (79.98)
Average rainy days	13.4	14.2	14.2	14.1	15.8	11.6	8.2	10.4	13.2	12.5	12.4	11.2	151.2
Average relative humidity (%)	75.6	76.9	77.4	78.9	80.2	80.4	77.1	78.0	77.8	75.2	75.7	74.0	77.3
Mean monthly sunshine hours	68.7	67.8	85.7	98.1	124.3	180.9	255.6	228.0	163.1	124.3	93.2	74.2	1,563.9
Source: Central Meteorological Bureau

== Demographics and culture ==
Historical population
Year	Pop.	±%
1946	140,762	—
1950	174,236	+23.8%
1955	210,336	+20.7%
1960	252,264	+19.9%
1965	298,663	+18.4%
1970	335,799	+12.4%
1975	346,914	+3.3%
1980	355,178	+2.4%
1985	361,549	+1.8%
1990	352,233	−2.6%
1995	358,981	+1.9%
2000	353,630	−1.5%
2005	345,303	−2.4%
2010	338,805	−1.9%
2015	331,945	−2.0%
2020	324,372	−2.3%
2025	312,807	−3.6%
Source: 1. "花蓮縣現住人口籍別 (1946-1970)". 花蓮縣統計要覽 (Report). Vol. 中華民國59年(60. 7). 花蓮縣政府主計室. July 1971. p. 13.; 2. "縣市人口按性別及五齡組(63)" (in Chinese (Taiwan)). Department of Household Registration,Ministry of the Interior (Taiwan).; 3. "各鄉鎮市區人口數" (in Chinese (Taiwan)). 內政統計月報. 2020-02-10. Archived from the original (XLS) on 2020-05-01.

Population density around the county (December 2009).

View source data.

=== Population ===
Hualien County has 318,995 inhabitants as of January 2023 and is divided into 1 city and 12 townships. Its late development means that many aboriginal cultures such as Amis, Atayal, Bunun, Truku, Sakizaya, and Kavalan are well-preserved. As of 2014, aboriginal people make up 27.5% of the population of Hualien County (about 91,675). The Hakka people comprise about 30% of inhabitants.

The county has seen negative population growth since the early 2000s due to emigration to other places outside Hualien County, with an average reduction of 1,393 people per year over the past 18 years.

According to a 2015 survey on national happiness index, Hualien County was rated as the happiest place to live in Taiwan among other 20 counties and cities due to strong levels of satisfaction with work-life balance, living condition, education, environmental quality and the performance of the local government.

=== Religion ===
The Buddhist Tzu Chi foundation is headquartered in Hualien City. There are also many temples around the county. Buddhism and folk religions are popular in Hualien County. Hualien County also has the highest concentration of Roman Catholics in Taiwan, with 9.46% of its population identifying as such.

=== Sports ===
Hualien County is home to the Hualien Stadium and Hualien Baseball Stadium.

Hualien County is a popular destination for cyclist enthusiasts and marathon runners because of its scenic views, clean air, favorable climate, and network of well-maintained bike trails. A number of cycling tournaments and marathon events are held each year in Hualien County. Notable events include the Taiwan KOM Challenge and the Taroko Gorge International Marathon.

List of sporting events held by Hualien County include:

- 2009 Asian Canoe Polo Championships
- 2026 Club Crew World Championships (CCWC)
- 2026 International Children's Games, Hualien's first international multi-sport event, and the third Taiwanese city to host the International Children's Games

== Economy ==
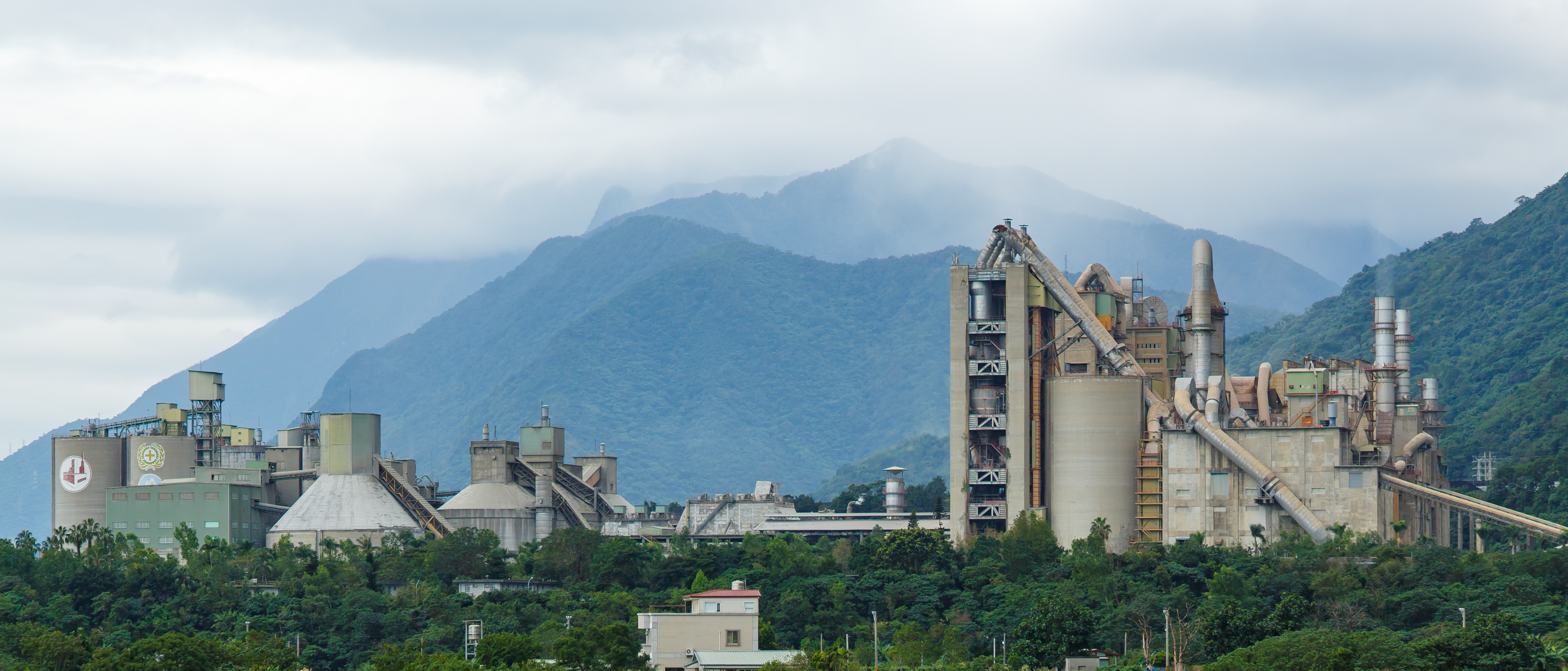
Cement plant in Xincheng Township.

There is cement mining activity in the county. The Asia Cement Corporation plant in Xincheng Township contributes nearly 29% of Taiwan's annual cement production.

== Education ==
The Hualien County Department of Education lists 6 institutions of higher learning within the county's borders as well as 15 high schools, 35 junior high schools and 151 elementary schools, though some of the listed elementary campuses have been closed for years due to their remote location and subsequently low enrollment.

=== Primary and secondary education ===
==== Secendary education ====
- National Hualien Senior High School
- National Hualien Girls' High School
- National Hualien Industrial Vocational High School
- National Hualien Commercial High School
- National Hualien Agricultural Senior High School
- National Yuli Senior High School
- Hualien Physical Education Senior High School
- Tzu Chi Senior High School Affiliated with Tzu Chi University
- Stella Maris Ursuline High School
- Szu Wei Senior High School

=== Higher education ===
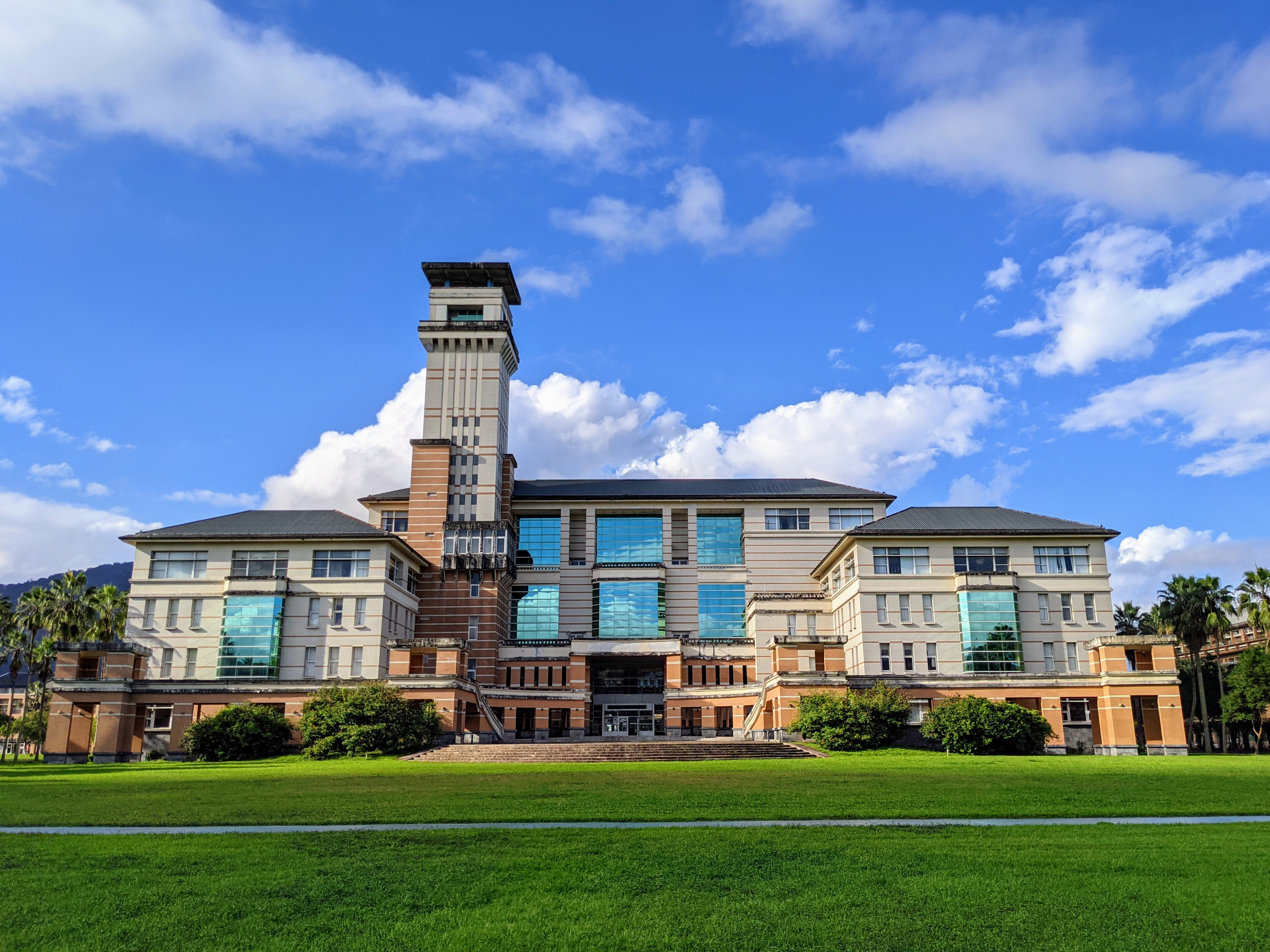
National Dong Hwa University Library

Hualien County is home to National Dong Hwa University, Tzu Chi University.

The National Dong Hwa University is the first and most prestigious university in Hualien, boasting the largest student body, largest concert hall, and largest library of any institute of higher education there. The National Hualien University of Education, which was merged with the National Dong Hwa University in 2008, was the first normal school in Hualien; only nine schools of its kind exist in Taiwan.

==== Mandarin education ====
- National Dong Hwa University Chinese Language Center
- Tzu Chi University Chinese Language Center

== Energy ==
Hualien County houses the hydroelectric Bihai Power Plant with an installed capacity of 61.2 MW and coal-fired Hoping Power Plant with a capacity of 1,320 MW, the fourth largest coal-fired power plant in Taiwan. Both power plants are located in Xiulin Township.

Due to its power plant, Hoping is also the location of a deep water bulk cargo port. Hoping Port is located in Hoping Village, Xiulin Township.

== Tourist attractions ==
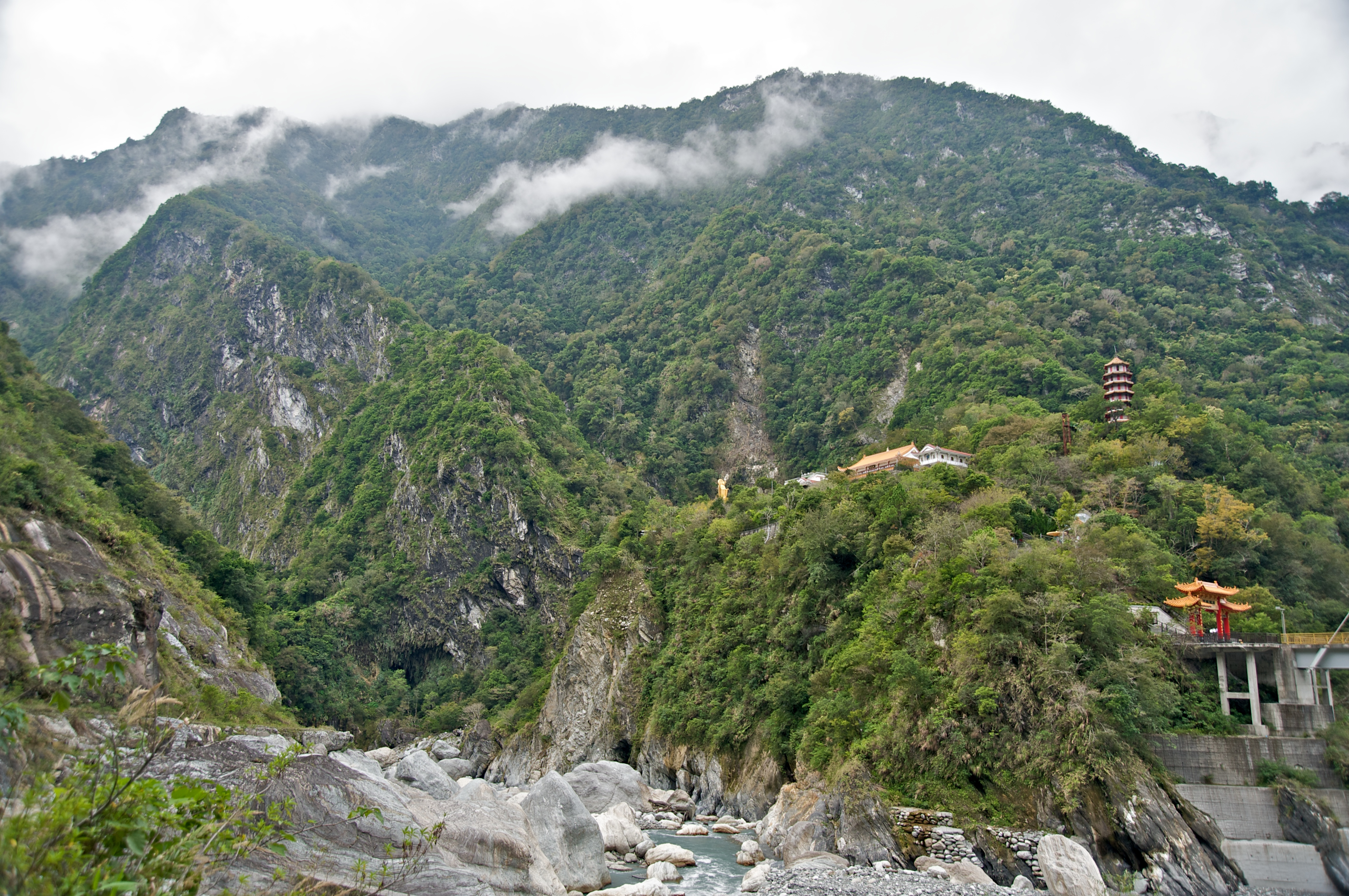
Taroko National Park

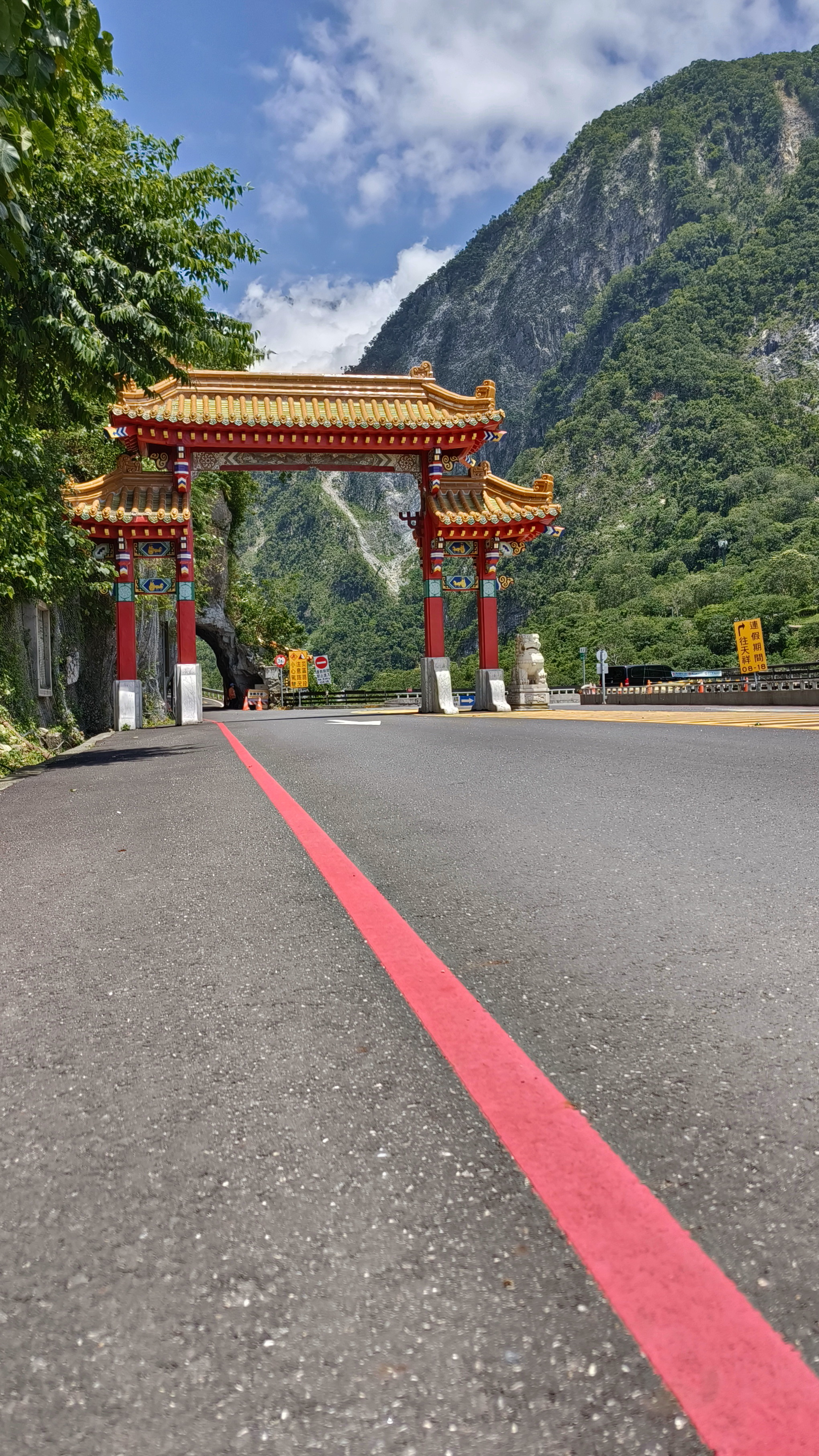
Taroko Archway

In 2023, Booking.com included Hualien as the only Asian city on its list of "Most Welcoming Cities on Earth." In 2024, Hualien was selected "Asia’s Top 9 Nature Destinations" by Agoda.

=== Nature ===
The national parks in the county include Matai'an Wetland Ecological Park, Taroko National Park and Yushan National Park. Notable mountains and cliffs in the county include Hehuan Mountain, Pingfeng Mountain, Qilai Mountain, and Qingshui Cliff. Other natural areas include the Liyu Lake, Shihtiping, Mugua River Gorge, Walami Trail, Niushan Huting, East Rift Valley, Rareseed Ranch, Lintianshan Forestry Culture Park, and Qixingtan Beach.

=== Museums ===
Museums and historical buildings in Hualien County include Dongli Story House, Hualien Sugar Factory, Pine Garden, Saoba Stone Pillars, Hualien Cultural and Creative Industries Park, Lintian Police Substation and Old Lintian Police Station, Chihsing Tan Katsuo Museum, and Hualien County Stone Sculptural Museum.

=== Theme parks ===
Farglory Ocean Park is in Hualien County.

=== Places of worships ===
Hualien Martyrs' Shrine, Hualien Sheng'an Temple, Hualien Chenghuang Temple, Xiangde Temple, Eternal Spring Shrine and Hualien Al-Falah Mosque are located in the county.

=== Markets ===
The one night market in the county is Dongdamen Night Market.

== Transportation ==
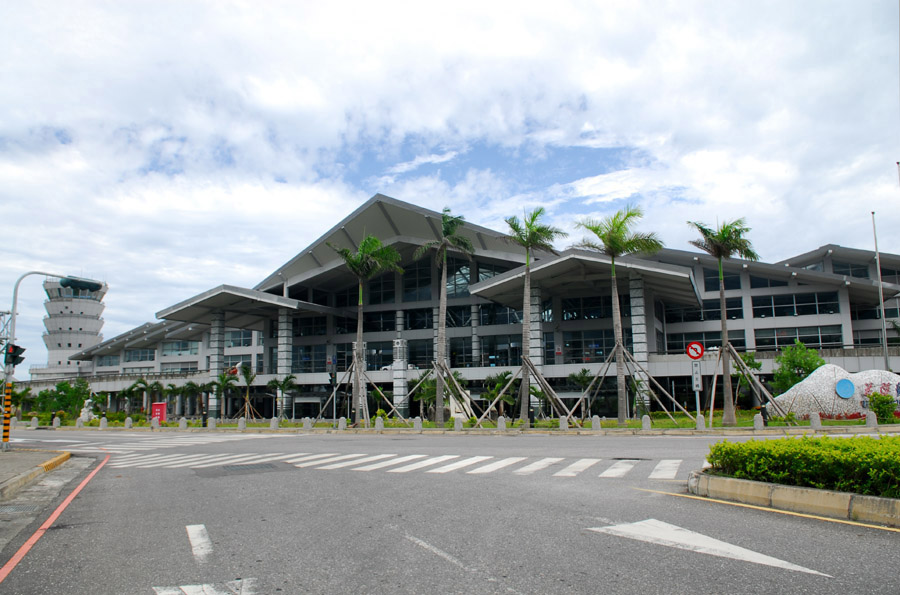
Hualien Airport

=== Air ===
- Hualien Airport (HUN)

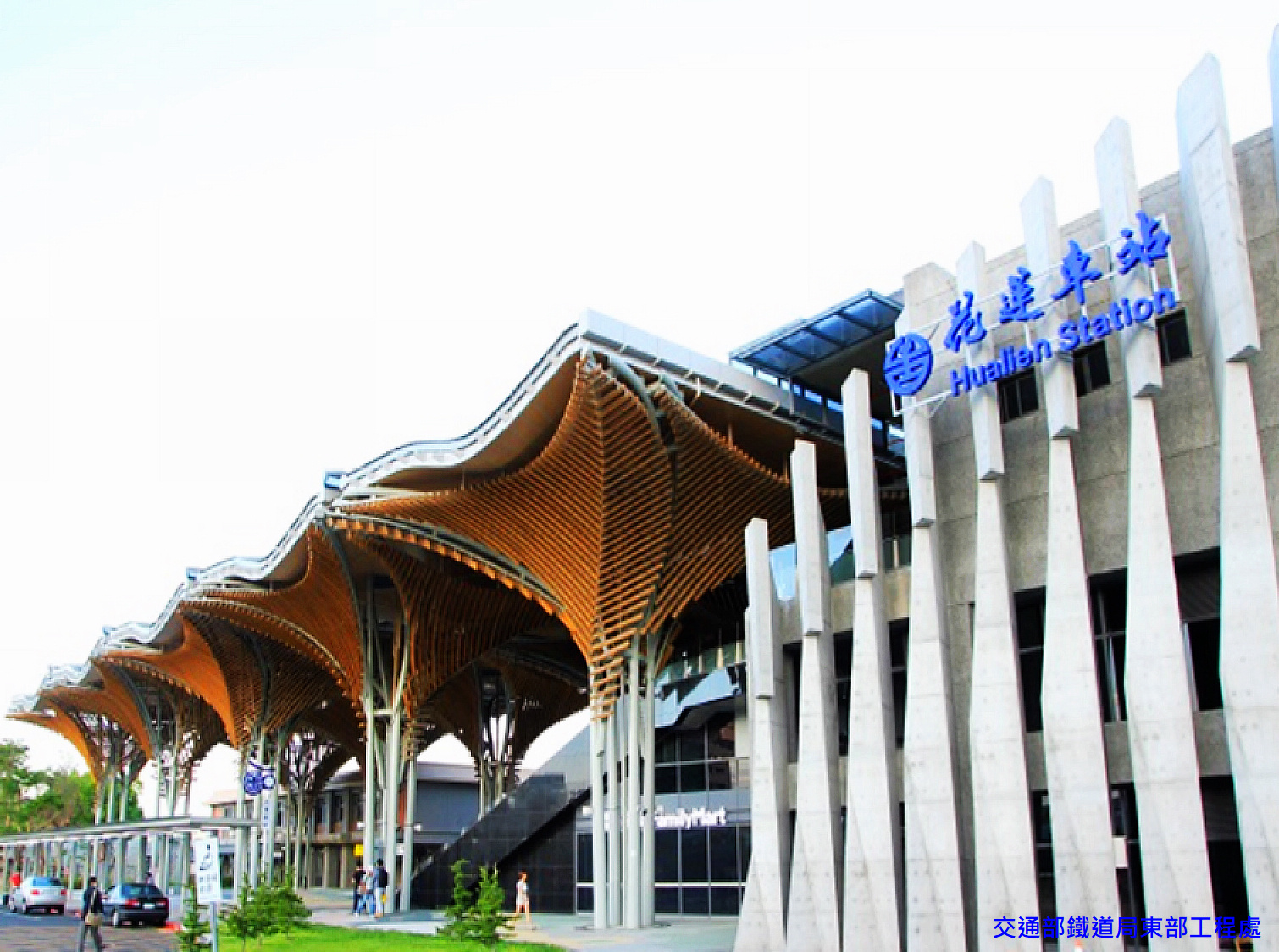
Hualien Station, Hualien City

=== Rail ===
- Taiwan Railway – North-Link Line, Taitung Line and Eastern Trunk Line

=== Bus ===
- Taroko Bus

=== Roads ===
- Provincial Highway No.8 (Central Cross-Island Highway)
- Provincial Highway No. 9 (Su'ao-Hualien and Hualien-Taitung Highway)
- Provincial Highway No. 11 (Hualien-Taitung Coast Highway)
- Provincial Highway No. 14
- Provincial Highway No. 16
- Provincial Highway No. 23 (Fuli-Donghe Highway)
- Provincial Highway No. 30 (Yuchang Highway)
- County Road No. 193

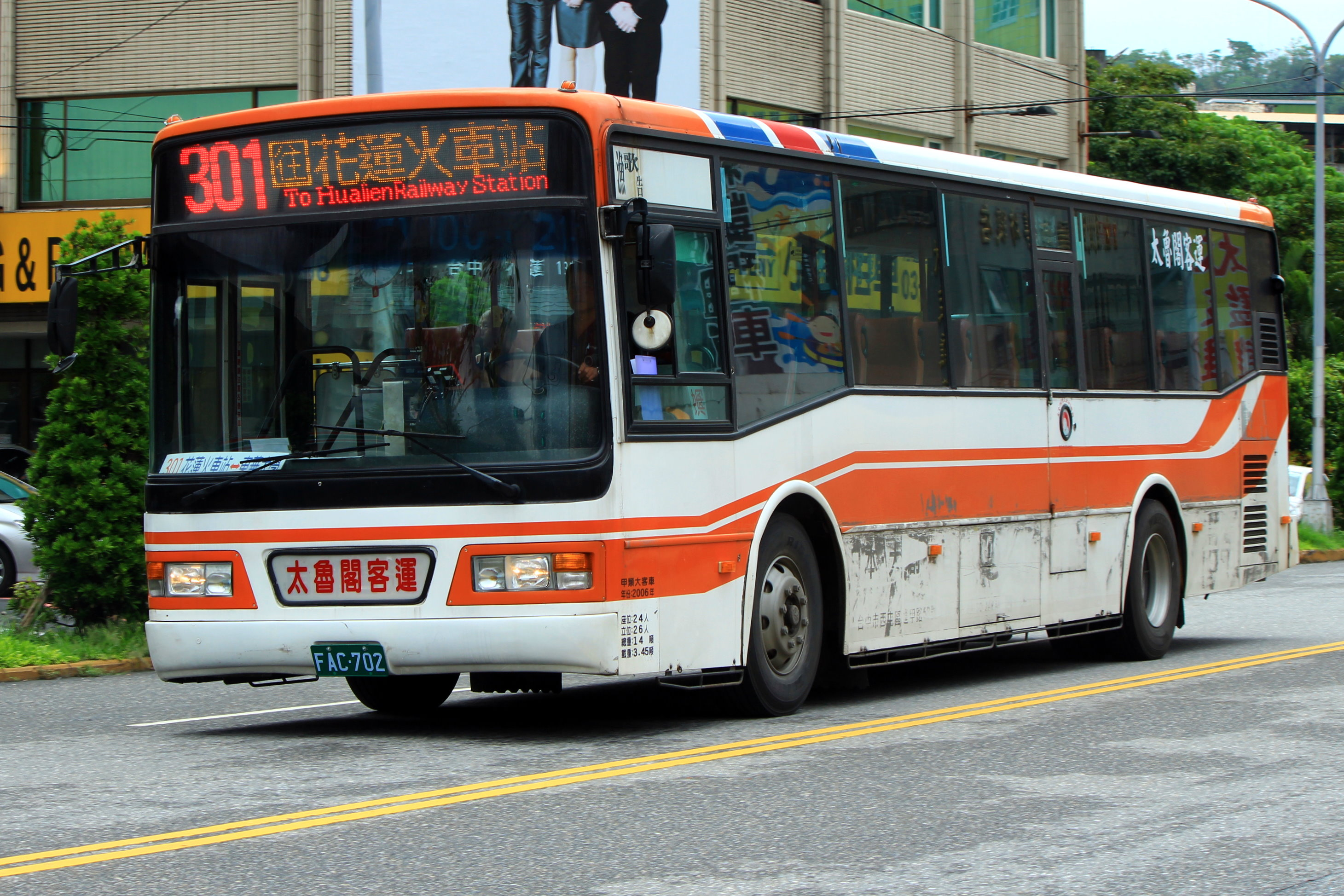
A Taroko Bus bus in 2015

=== Sea ===
- Port of Hualien
- Heping Cement Port

== Sister cities ==
- Hawaii County, Hawaii, United States
- Bellevue, Washington, United States
- Albuquerque, New Mexico, United States
- Takachiho, Miyazaki, Japan
- Yonaguni, Okinawa, Japan

== See also ==
- List of tourist attractions in Taiwan
- Taiwanese Bunun Ancestral Remains Repatriation Case

== Notable people ==
- Vincent Fang (lyricist), Taiwanese lyricist
