= Huadong =

Huadong may refer to:

- East China (华东, Huádōng)
- Huadong, Guangdong (花东), a town in Guangzhou, Guangdong, China
- Huadong, Guangxi (化峒), a town in Jingxi, Guangxi, China
- Huadong Subdistrict, Huanghua (骅东街道), a subdistrict of Huanghua, Hebei, China
- Huadong Subdistrict, Fuxin (华东街道), a subdistrict of Fuxin, Liaoning, China
- Huadong Hospital (华东医院), a teaching hospital in Shanghai, China

== Taiwan ==
- Huadong Valley (花東縱谷), a valley in eastern Taiwan
  - Huadong Highway, a section of the Provincial Highway No. 9 in eastern Taiwan
