= Danongdafu Forest Park =

Forest in Guangfu, Hualien County, Taiwan

- 大農大富平地森林園區
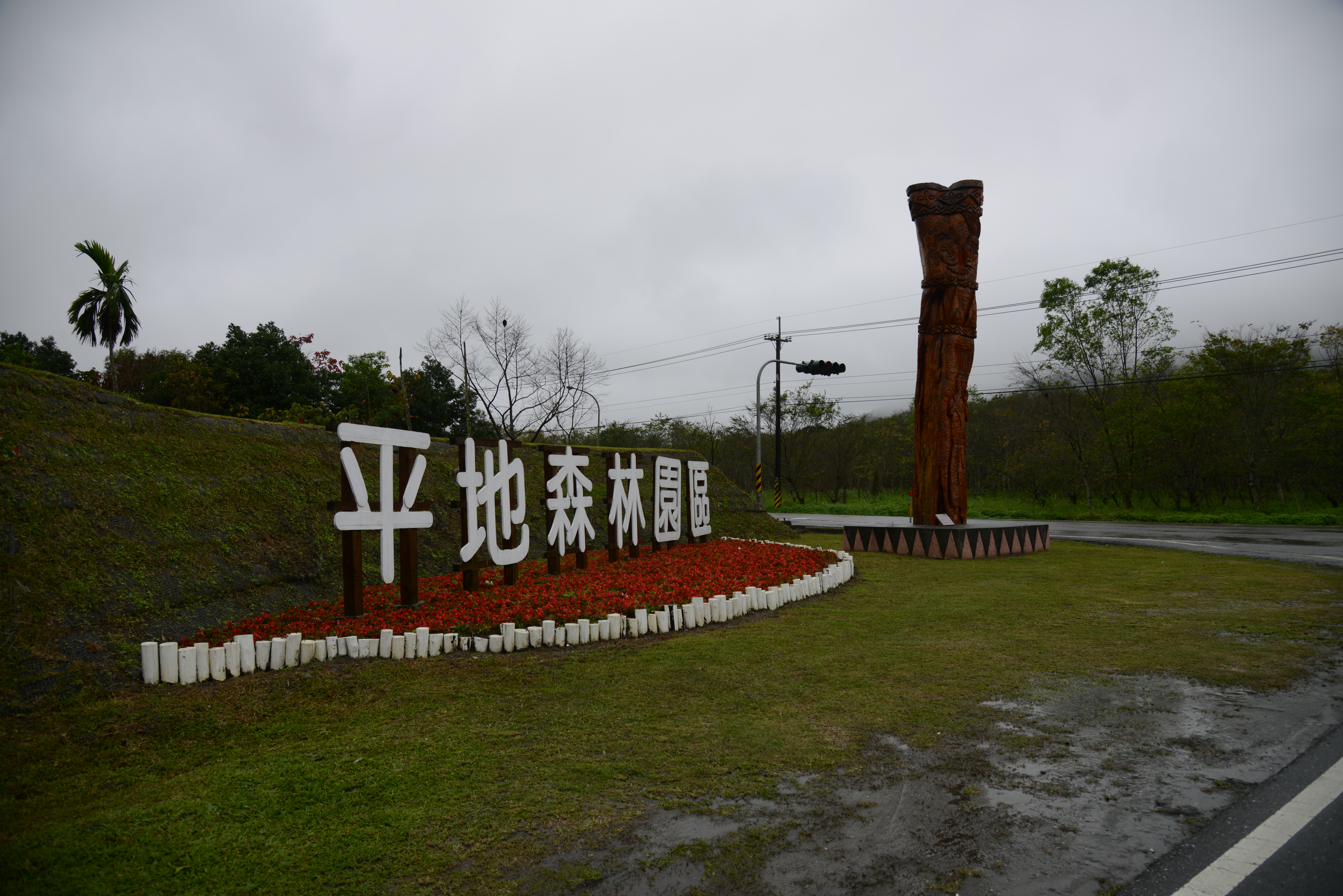
- Interactive map of Danongdafu Forest Park
- Type: forest
- Location: Guangfu, Hualien County, Taiwan
- Coordinates: 23°36′53.5″N 121°25′03.8″E
- Area: 12.5 km^{2} (4.8 sq mi)

The Danongdafu Forest Park (traditional Chinese: 大農大富平地森林園區; simplified Chinese: 大农大富平地森林园区; pinyin: Dànóngdàfù Píngdì Sēnlín Yuánqū) is a forest in Guangfu Township, Hualien County, Taiwan.

== History ==
In 2002, the Forestry Bureau started to re-purpose agricultural land in the area to become forests. Trees were planted and the area became a recreational park in 2010.

== Geology ==
The forest is a flatland forest type and is located along the Huadong Valley. It spans over an area of 12.5 km^{2}. It consists of over a million trees with almost 20 different types commonly found at low altitude. It consists of various outdoor sculptures and statues depicting the culture of Taiwanese indigenous peoples.

== Events ==
The forest is the venue for the Hualien Hot Air Balloon Festival.

== Transportation ==
The forest is accessible northeast of Dafu Station of Taiwan Railway.

== See also ==
- List of parks in Taiwan
