= Nyungu Yamawe Forest Park =

Forest park in Uganda

Coordinates: 0°26′20″N 32°39′04″E

Nyungu Yamawe Forest Park is a forest park which was started in 2019 by Workspaces Ltd, a conservation social enterprise in Uganda.

Located in Kira off Bulindo road, Kitukutwe Trading Centre, the park spans over 15 acres.

The name Nyungu Yamawe is synonymous with the King of the Nyamwezi people, in the northern part of Tanzania and south-western Uganda.

The park is mostly used as camping site, with wood, bamboo and grass eco-cottages. It also hosts different events, such as the Rumble in the Jungle, Ndeku festival, meat carnivals, and so on.
