= Hualien Sugar Factory =

Former factory in Guangfu, Hualien County, Taiwan

- 花蓮糖廠
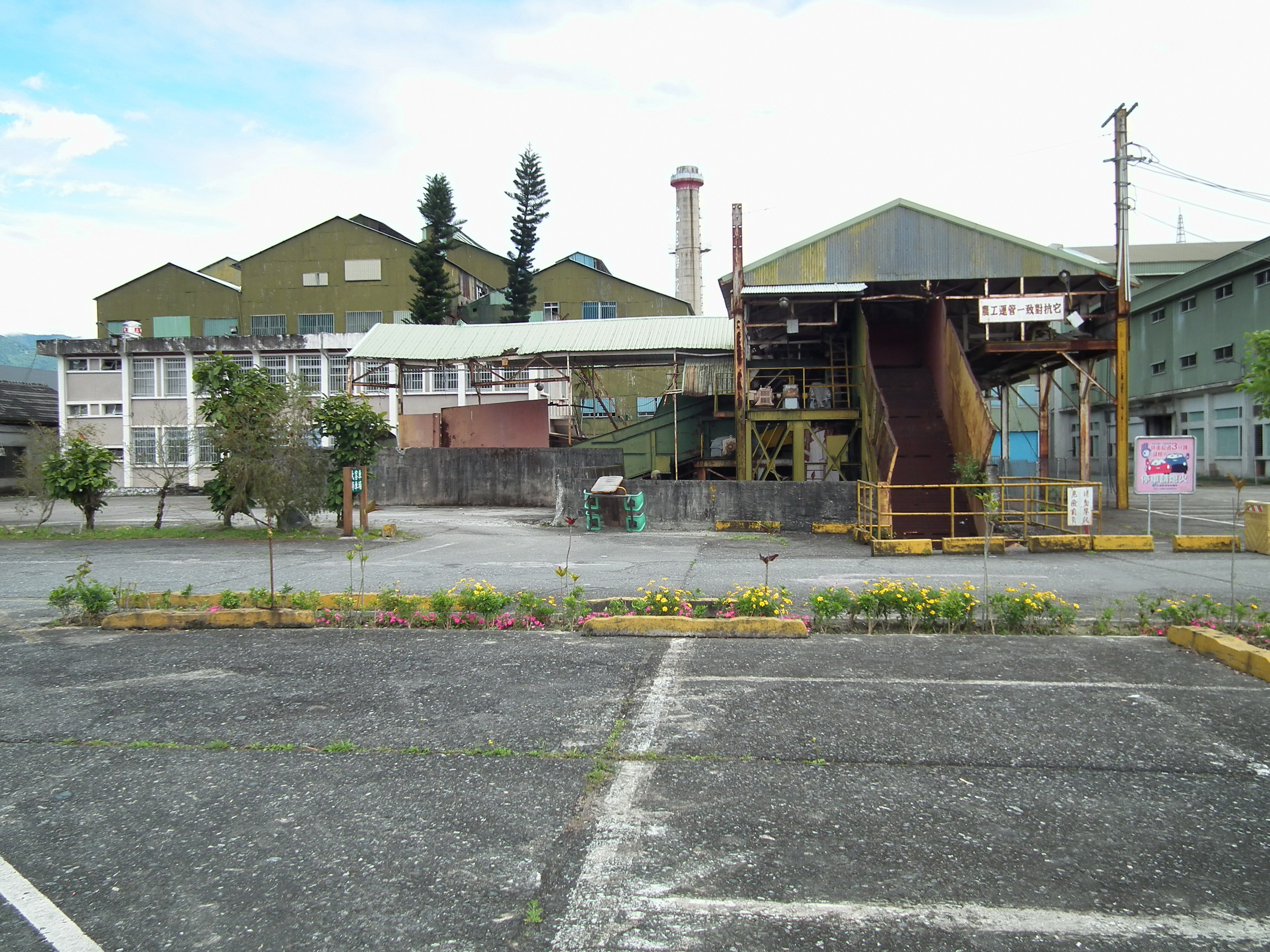
- Interactive map of Hualien Sugar Factory
- Former names: Hualien Manufacturing Plant Dahe Factory
- Location: Guangfu, Hualien County, Taiwan
- Coordinates: 23°39′32.6″N 121°25′19.6″E
- Type: former sugar refinery

Construction
- Built: 1913
- Renovated: 1948

The Hualien Sugar Factory (traditional Chinese: 花蓮糖廠; simplified Chinese: 花莲糖厂; pinyin: Huālián Táng Chǎng) is a former sugar refinery in Guangfu Township, Hualien County, Taiwan.

== History ==
The factory was originally established as the Hualien Manufacturing Plant Dahe Factory during the Japanese rule of Taiwan in 1913. During World War II, the factory was heavily damaged by the United States Air Force bombing. After assessment, it was decided that the factory to be restored. After the handover of Taiwan from Japan to the Republic of China in 1945, it was renamed to Hualien Sugar Factory of the Taiwan Sugar Corporation. After full restoration, the sugar production restarted in 1948. The factory finally ceased to operate in 2002.

== Transportation ==
The factory is accessible within walking distance south of Guangfu Station of Taiwan Railway.

== See also ==
- List of tourist attractions in Taiwan
