= Matai'an Wetland Ecological Park =

Wetland in Guangfu, Hualien County, Taiwan

- 馬太鞍濕地公園 (Chinese)
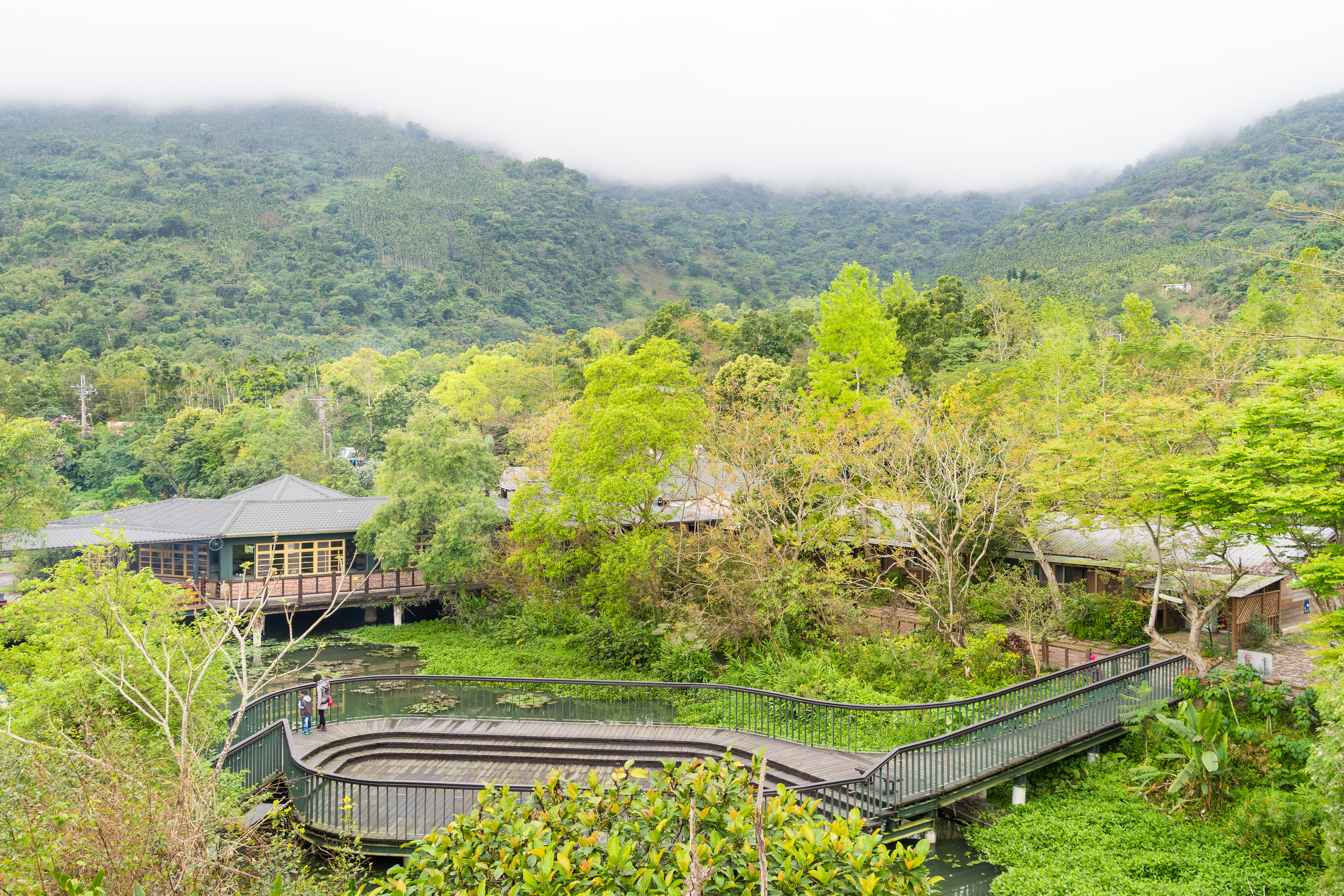

- Location within Hualien County Location within Taiwan
- Location: Guangfu, Hualien County, Taiwan
- Nearest city: Hualien City
- Coordinates: 23°39′29.6″N 121°24′31.8″E
- Area: 250 acres (100 ha)

The Matai'an Wetland Ecological Park (traditional Chinese: 馬太鞍濕地公園; simplified Chinese: 马太鞍湿地公园; pinyin: Mǎtàiān Shīdì Gōngyuán) is a wetland in Guangfu Township, Hualien County, Taiwan.

== Name ==
Matai'an, which means tree bean, comes from the Matai'an tribe of the indigenous Amis people who inhabit the area around the wetland. The wetland is also called the Fataan Wetland Ecological Park.

== History ==
The area around the wetland has been used by the local tribe for farming and fishing. Recently, the area has been developed for tourism purpose where currently it has three inns.

Since the 1970s, natural disasters have created 88 barrier lakes in Taiwan, although most of them disappeared within a year. A landslide during Tropical Storm Wipha in July 2025 created a barrier lake in Matai'an. It overflowed in September of the same year, during Typhoon Ragasa, sweeping away a bridge along Provincial Highway 9 and causing flooding in Guangfu, Fenglin and Wanrong Townships. Authorities said that 60 million tonnes of the lake's 91 million tonnes of water was discharged. At least 18 people were killed while 107 others were injured. Around six people went missing with 300 others stranded. 60% of Guangfu's population, equivalent to 5,200 people, were forced to seek shelter in the higher floors of their residences.

== Geology ==
The wetland is located at the foot of Mount Masi and spans over an area of almost 100 hectares. The wetland is formed by the flow of Fudeng River. The wetland consists of around 100 types of water plants. It is also equipped with a bicycle trail.

== Ecology ==
Species found in this wetland are various aquatic fishes, amphibians, butterflies and shorebirds. There are also around 100 aquatic plants found in the pond. The number of butterflies spike during spring time.

== Transportation ==
The wetland is accessible within walking distance southwest of Guangfu Station of Taiwan Railway.

== See also ==
- Geography of Taiwan
