= Fenglin, Hualien =

Fenglin Township 鳳林鎮 Fonglin
- Urban township
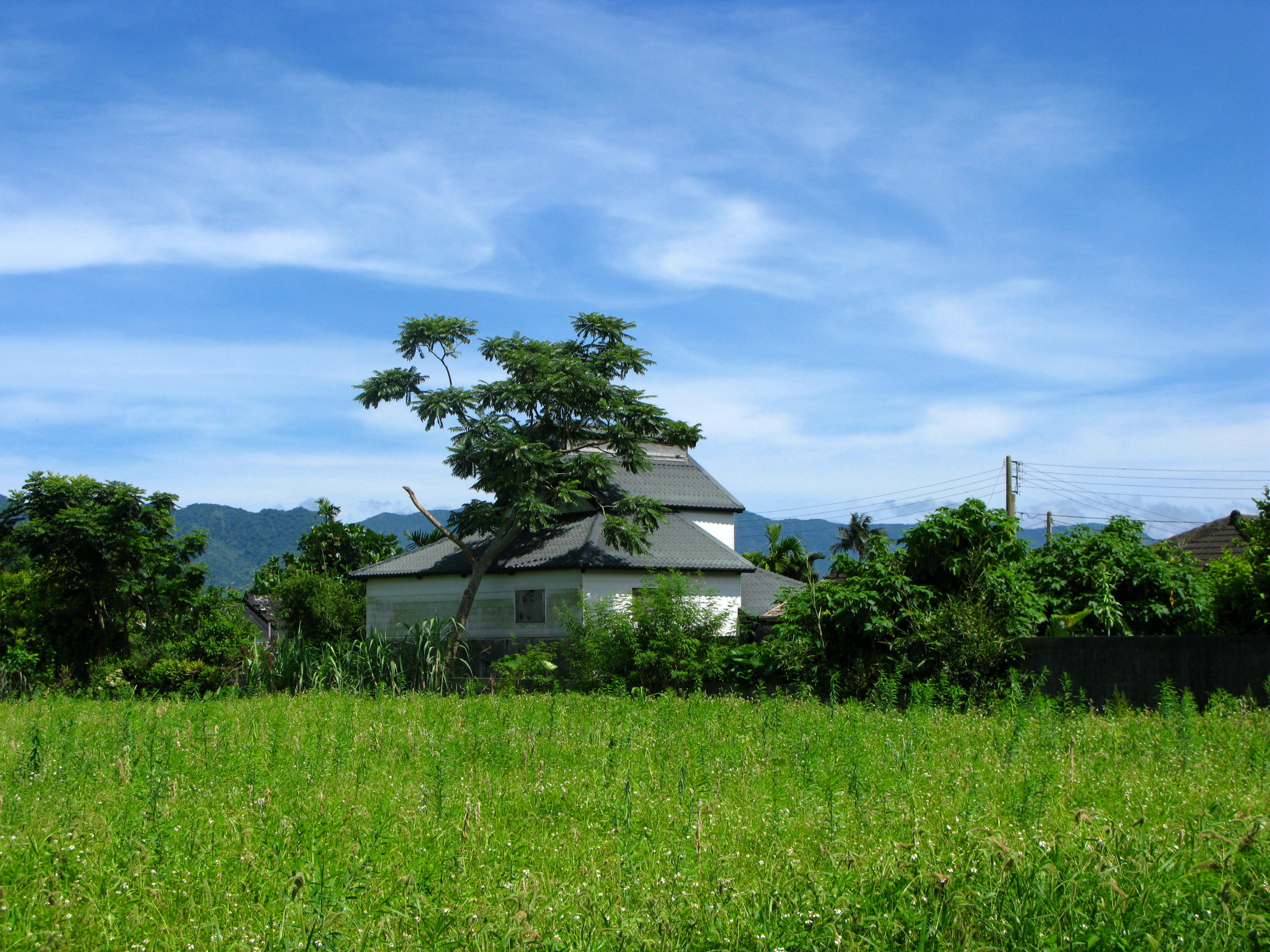
- A tobacco barn in Fenglin Township

- Coordinates: 23°45′00″N 121°26′00″E
- Country: Taiwan
- Province: Taiwan Province
- County: Hualien

Government
  - Type: Urban Township

Area
  - Total: 120.5181 km^{2} (46.5323 sq mi)

Population (February 2023)
  - Total: 10,552
- Time zone: UTC+8 (CST)
- Post code: 975
- Subdivision: 12 Villages
- Website: www.fonglin.gov.tw (in Chinese)

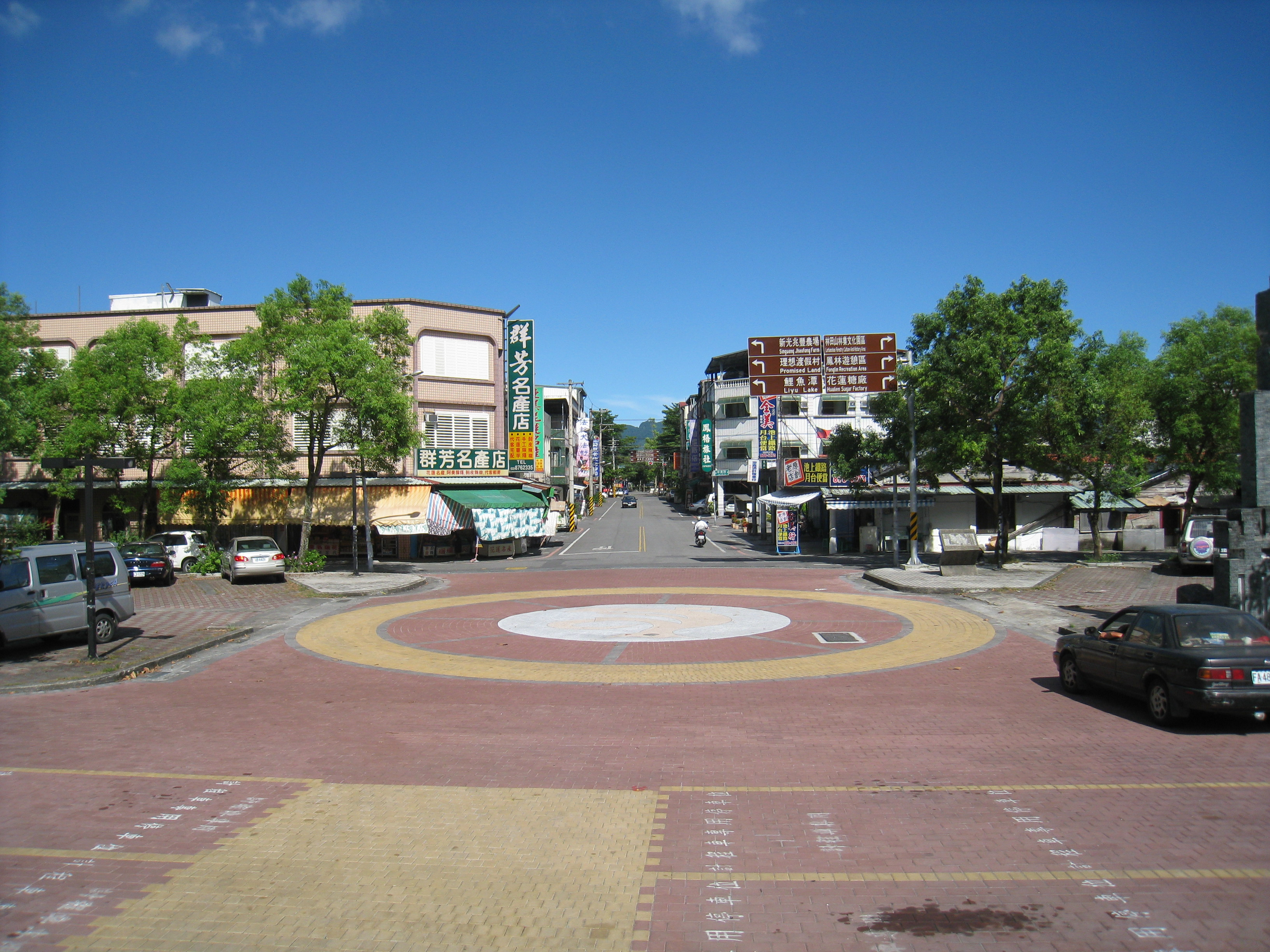
Street view in Fonglin Township

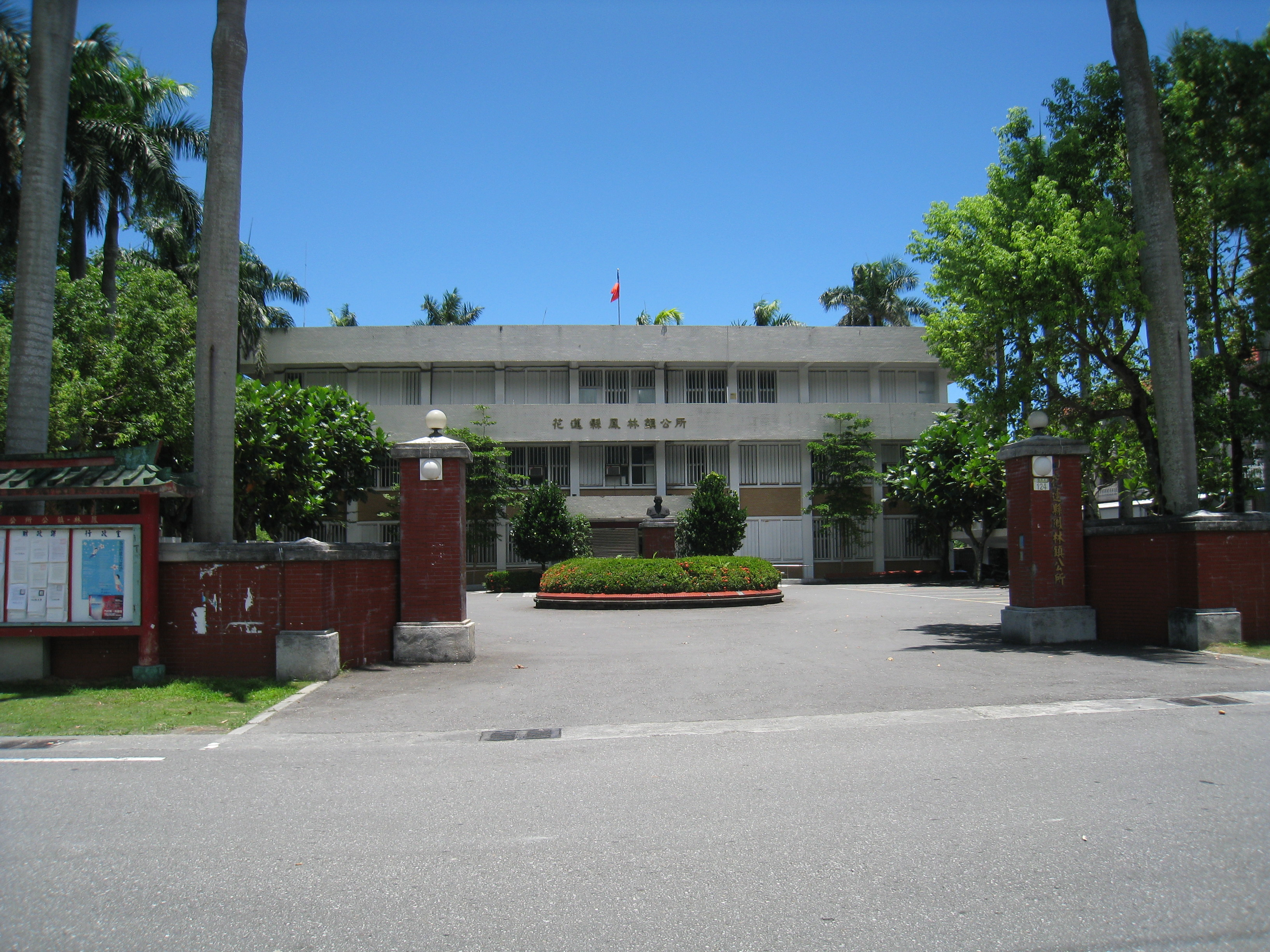
Fenglin Township Office

Fenglin Township, (Chinese: 鳳林鎮; pinyin: Fènglín Zhèn; lit. 'Phoenix forest') is an urban township in central Hualien County, Taiwan. It is located in Huatung Valley bordering Shoufeng Township on the north and Guangfu Township on the south. It has a population of around 10,552 inhabitants in 12 villages.

== Geography ==
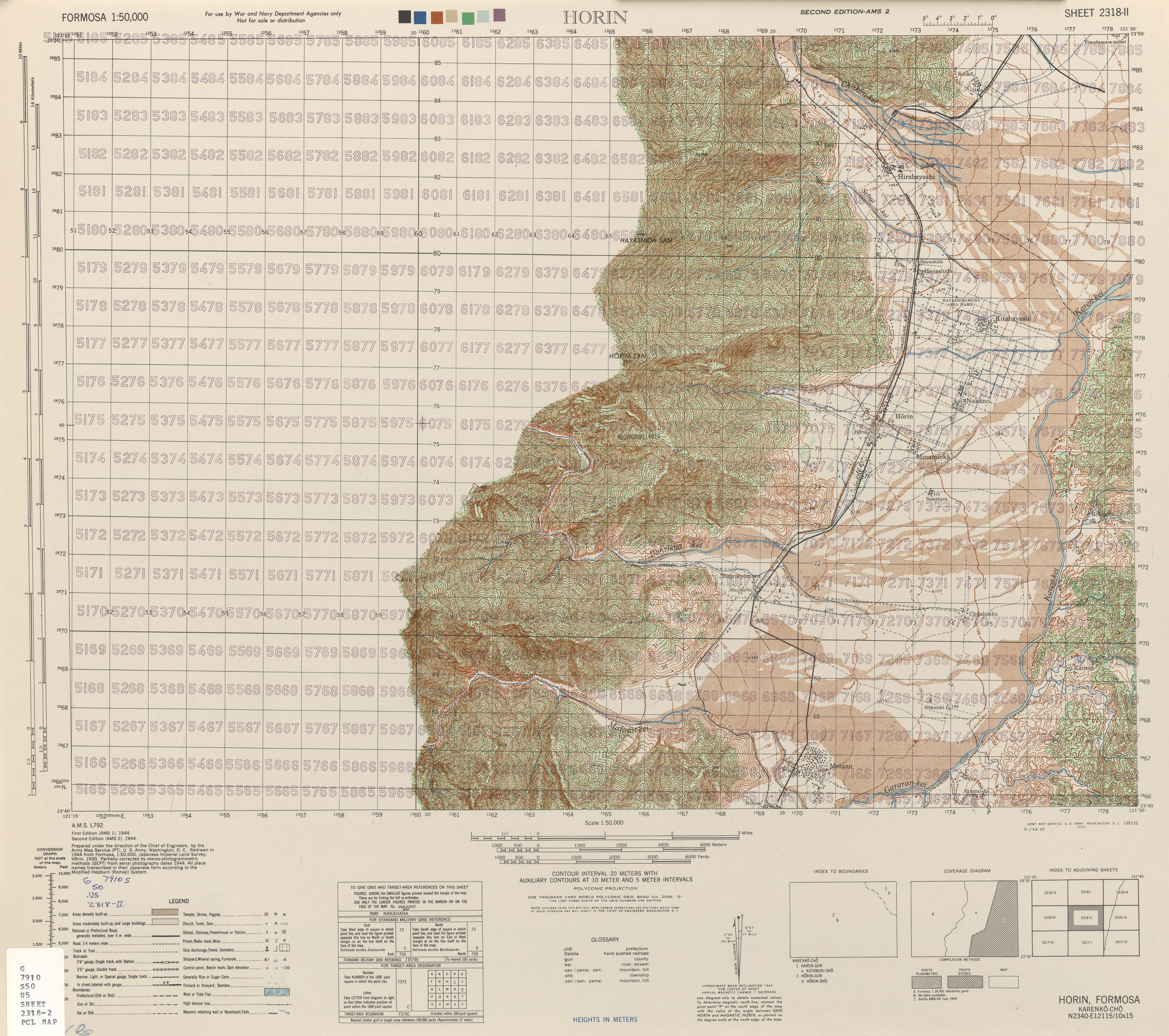
Map of Fenglin (labeled as Hōrin) and surrounding area (1944)

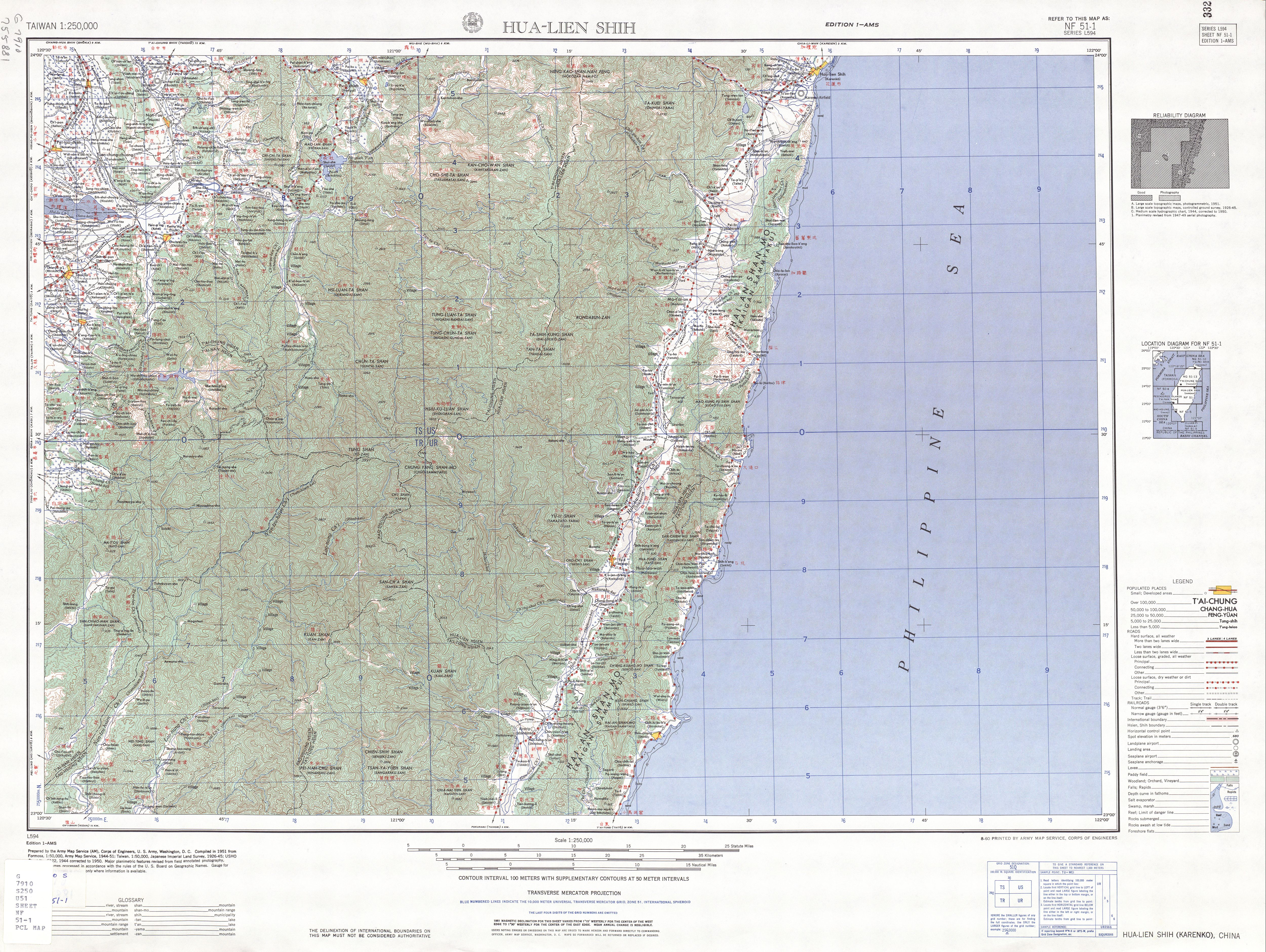
Map including Fenglin (labeled as Feng-lin (Hōrin) 鳳林) (1951)

The administration area here is 120.518 km^{2}, and located in the Huatung Valley plain between Central Mountain Range and Hai'an Range (Coastal Range).

== Administrative divisions ==
Fengren, Fengyi, Fengli, Fengzhi, Fengxin, Shanxing, Darong, Beilin, Nanping, Linrong, Zhangqiao and Senrong Village.

== Education ==
Fenglin Township has 3 junior high schools and 8 elementary schools. Fenglin Senior High School and 1 university are planning for construction.

== Tourist attractions ==
- Fenglin Hakka Cultural Museum
- Fenglin Recreation Area
- Fenglin Road Park
- Fenglin Township Vegetable Area
- Jianying Park
- Linrong Recreation Area
- Lintian Police Substation and Old Lintian Police Station
- Cilakaiyan Tribe (吉拉卡樣部落)
- Lintianshan Forestry Culture Park
- Principle Dream Factory

== Events ==
- Mipaliw Wetlands Art Festival

== Transportation ==
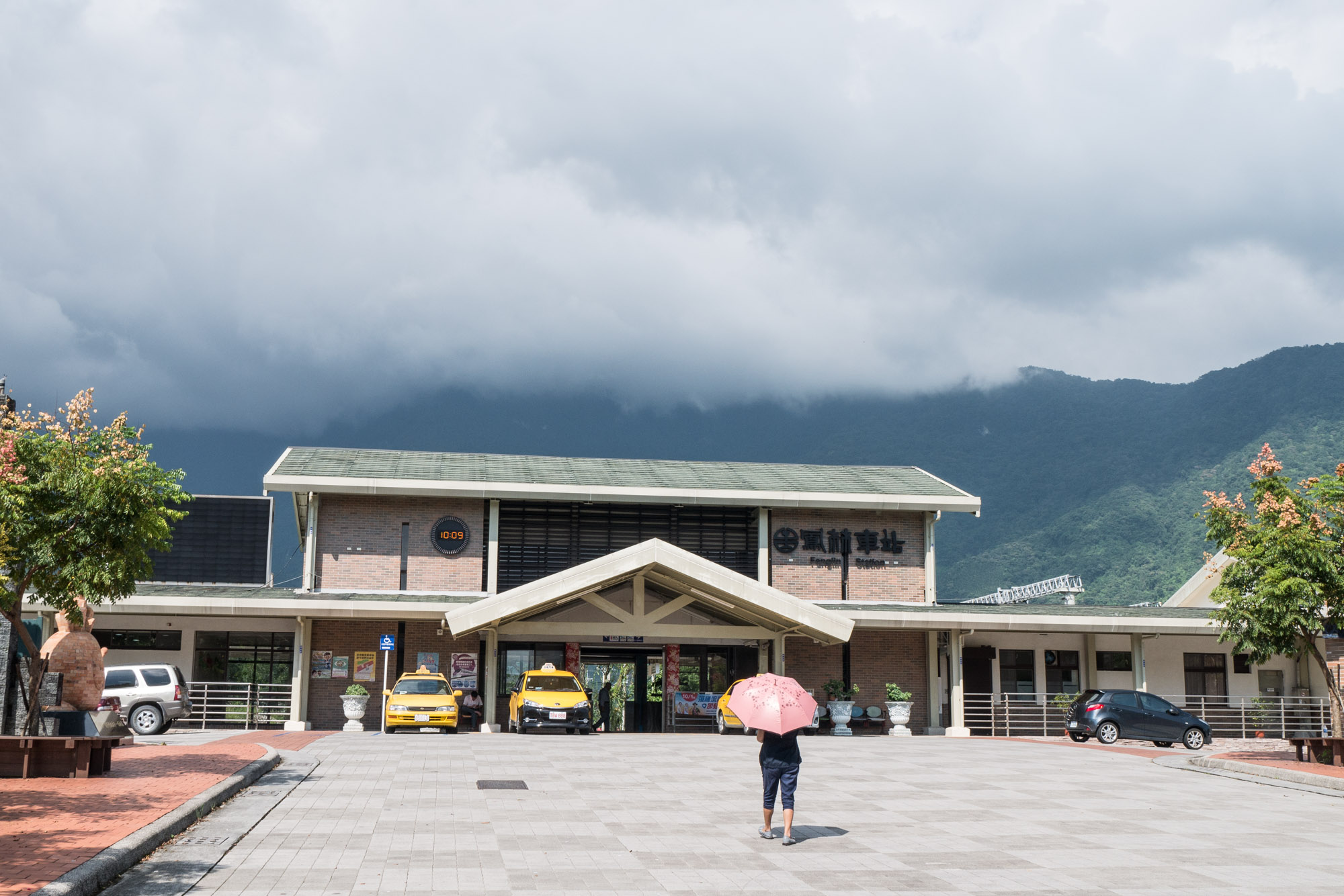
Fenglin Rail Station

=== Railway ===
TR Taitung Line (Huadong Line)

- Linrong Station
- Nanping Station
- Fenglin Station
- Wanrong Station

=== Road ===
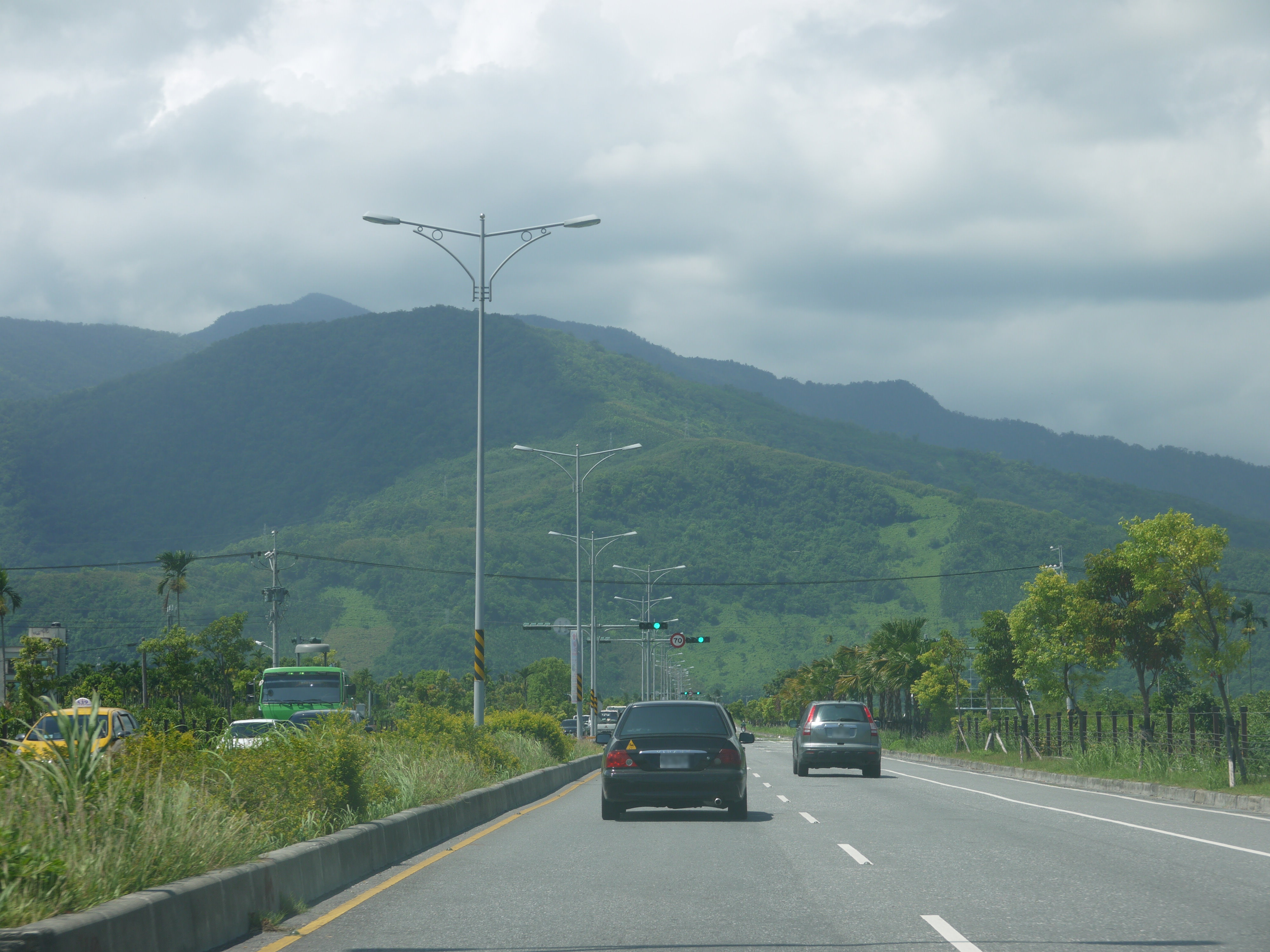
Huadong Highway passing through Fenglin Township

- Provincial Highway No.9 (Huadong Highway)
- Provincial Highway No.16 Eastern segment
  - County Road No.193 (Chinese)

== Notable natives ==
- Chang Fu-hsing, Magistrate of Hualien County (2001-2003)
