= Forest park =

Park encompassing woodlands

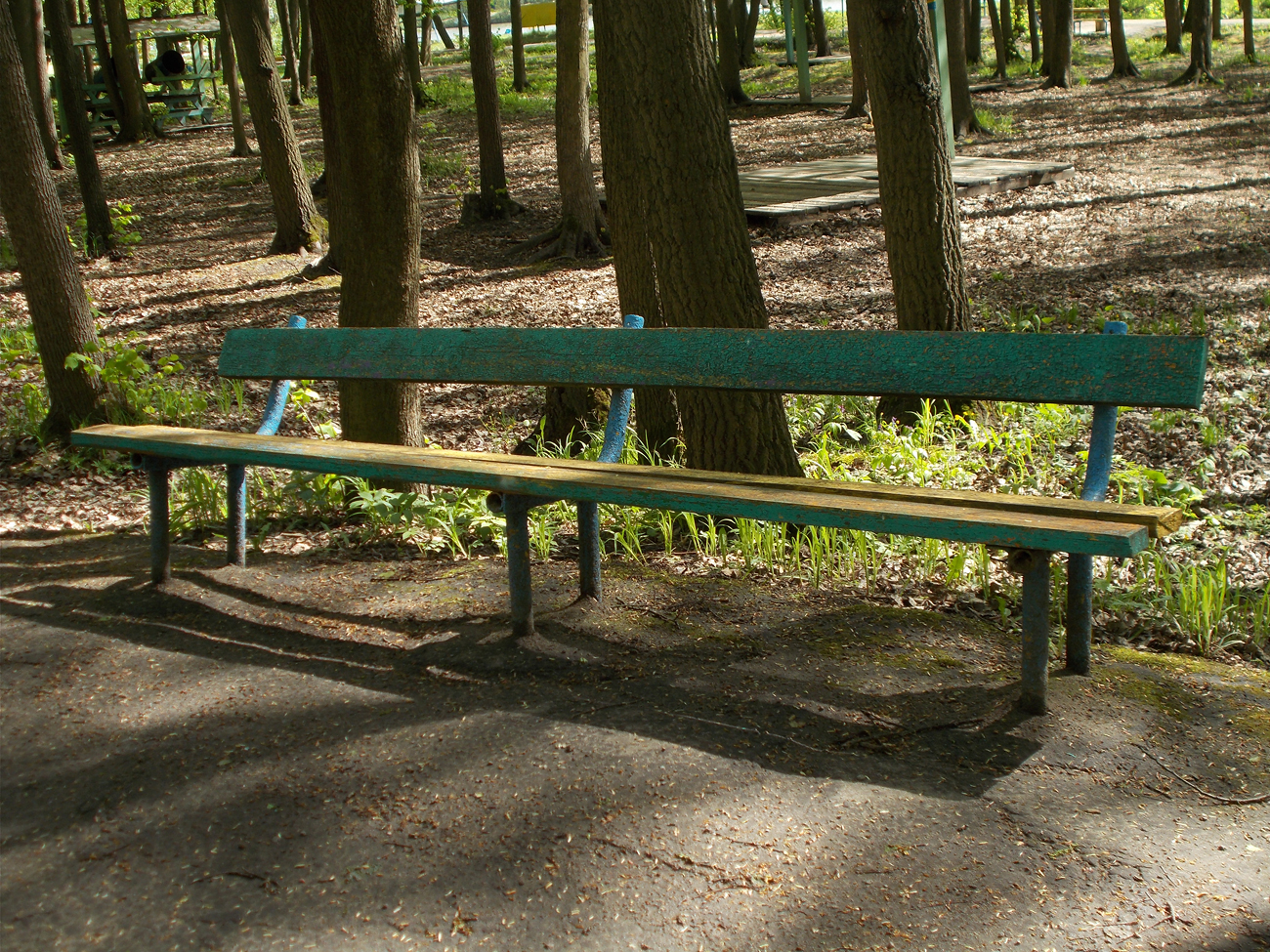
Electrostal Forest Park, Russia

A forest park is a park whose main theme is its forest of trees. Forest parks are usually found in the urban environment: cities/towns and suburbs and are commonly use for recreation. Many of them are protected areas.

== Examples ==
=== Belgium ===
- Forest Park, Brussels

=== Chile ===
- Forest Park, Santiago

=== China ===
- Gongqing Forest Park, Shanghai
- Mufushan National Forest Park, Hunan Province
- Zhangjiajie National Forest Park, Hunan Province
- Longwanqun National Forest Park, Jilin Province
- Huishan National Forest Park, Jiangsu Province
- Xishan Forest Park, Yunnan Province

=== Germany ===
- Bavarian Forest National Park
- Black Forest National Park

=== Iran ===
- Lavizan Forest Park

=== Japan ===
- Aichiken Forest Park (Nagoya, Aichi)
- Musashi Kyūryō National Government Park (Namegawa, Saitama)

=== New Zealand ===
- The Catlins

=== Poland ===
- Arkona Forest Park in Szczecin
- Birch Woods Park in Warsaw
- Kabaty Woods in Warsaw
- Mścięcino Forest Park in Szczecin and Police

=== Russia ===
- Bittsa Park, Moscow
- Troparyovsky Park, Moscow
- Tyoply Stan zakaznik
- Southwestern forest park (Moscow)

See also: Category:Moscow Forest Parks

=== Taiwan ===
- Daan Forest Park in Taipei
- Danongdafu Forest Park in Hualien County
- Dongshi Forestry Culture Park in Taichung
- Linhousilin Forest Park in Pingtung County
- Lintianshan Forestry Culture Park in Hualien County
- Luodong Forestry Culture Park in Yilan County
- Taitung Forest Park in Taitung City
- Youchang Forest Park in Kaohsiung

=== United Kingdom ===
- Brierley Forest Park, England
- Argyll Forest Park, Scotland

=== United States ===
- Forest Park Nature Center, Peoria, Illinois
- Forest Park (Springfield, Massachusetts)
- Forest Park, St. Louis, Missouri
- Forest Park, Queens, New York City, New York
- Forest Park (Portland, Oregon)
- Forest Park, Everett, Washington
- Prince William Forest Park, Dumfries, Virginia
