= Nanping station =

Nanping station can refer to the following stations:

- Nanping railway station, a railway station on the TRA Taitung Line in Hualien, Taiwan
- Nanping station (Chongqing), a rapid transit station in Chongqing, China
- Nanpingshi railway station (literally "Nanping City railway station"), a railway station on Hefei–Fuzhou high-speed railway in Nanping, Fujian, China.
