= Lintianshan Forestry Culture Park =

Forest in Fenglin, Hualien County, Taiwan

- 林田山林業文化園區
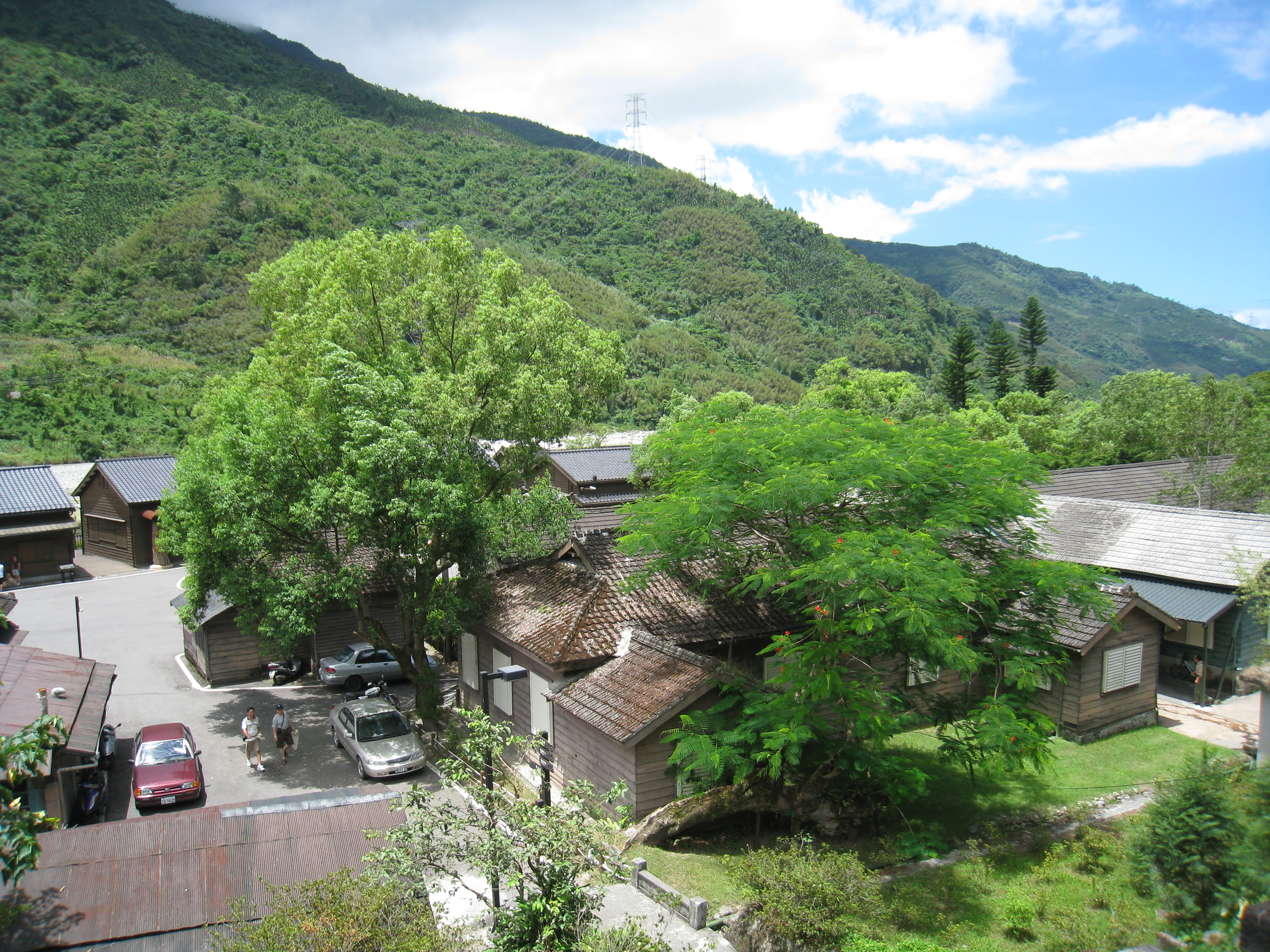
- Interactive map of Lintianshan Forestry Culture Park
- Type: historical forestry settlement
- Location: Fenglin, Hualien County, Taiwan
- Coordinates: 23°43′05.2″N 121°23′56.2″E
- Website: https://www.forest.gov.tw/EN/0000221

The Lintianshan Forestry Culture Park (traditional Chinese: 林田山林業文化園區; simplified Chinese: 林田山林业文化园区; pinyin: Líntián Shān Línyè Wénhuà Yuánqū) is a former lumber town in Fenglin Township, Hualien County, Taiwan.

== History ==
Forestry began in the area since 1918 with a name of Morisaka. The park was originally the ground for logs processing area from Mount Da'an during the Japanese rule of Taiwan. Felling works were done by Hualien Harbor Timber. In 1925, the area was declared by the Japanese government as the Lintianshan logging area. In 1939, Hualien Harbor Timber was renamed to Taiwan Kougyou Kabusiki Gaisya and established the Taiwan Xingye Company Lintianshan Logging Office. Since then, several railways, dormitories and buildings were established to support the business there.

After the handover of Taiwan from Japan to the Republic of China in 1945, the Resource Management Committee of the Ministry of Economic Affairs took over the site and it was named Senrong. The management of the site was then assigned to Taiwan Paper Company. In 1954, the site was transferred to private company. The logging activities reached their peak in 1960. In the same year, a fire destroyed the log mill, water pipes and hydrants at the area. In 1972, the site was transferred to Zhongxing Paper Company operated by Taiwan Provincial Government. In the same year, a month-long wildfire destroyed 1.2 km^{2} of the forest area. In 1973, the logging industries were in decline and the control of the site was assumed by the Forestry Bureau. In 1988, the logging activities at the site were completely halted.

The bureau then merged the two sites at Guangfu and Fenglin under the Wanrong Work Station of the Hualien Forest District Office. Soon after that, a plan to establish the Lintianshan Forestry Culture Park at the site was put into the discussion. In 2006, the site was declared a historical village by the Cultural Affairs Bureau of Hualien County Government.

== Architecture ==
The park consists of former offices and residential buildings, dormitories, logging tools and machines, rail tracks, elementary school and a church. Currently the site is divided into the forestry exhibition area, early settlement buildings and the remains of Kangle New Village, administration and management area and hiking trails.

== Railroad ==
In the past, a 34 km (21 mi) system of railroads and ropeways was used to transport lumber from the mountains to Wanrong, which was connected to the rest of the island's rail network. To overcome the terrain, the network was divided into three sections of rail with ropeways in between. In total, the network spanned between 172 m (564 ft) and 2,620 m (8,600 ft) above sea level. The railway also operated passenger services between Wanrong and Senrong for employees.

== See also ==
- List of parks in Taiwan
