= Guangfu railway station =

Railway station located in Hualien, Taiwan

Guangfu Station 光復車站
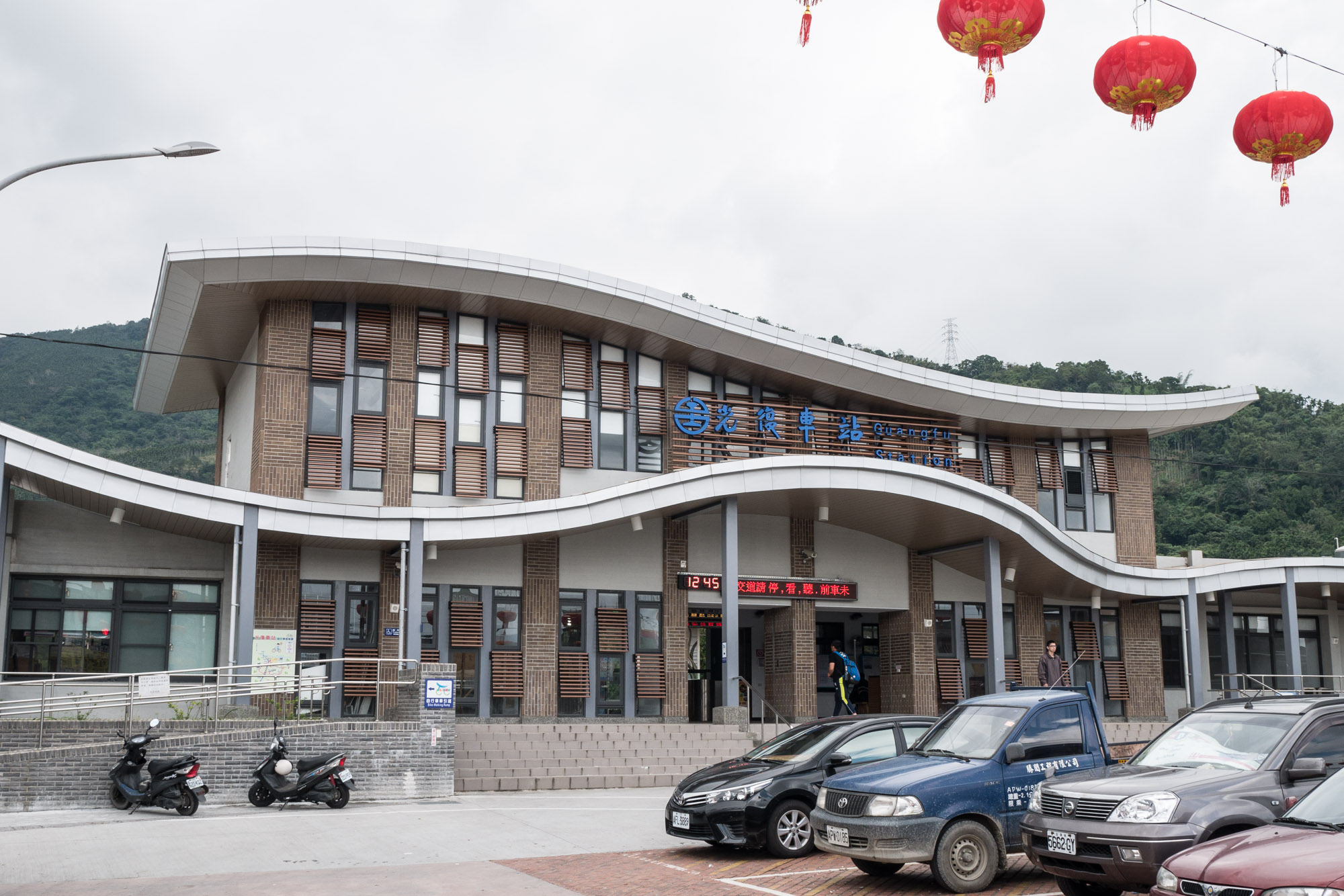

Chinese name
- Traditional Chinese: 光復車站
Transcriptions
Standard Mandarin
- Hanyu Pinyin: Guāngfù Chēzhàn
- Bopomofo: ㄍㄨㄤ ㄈㄨˋ ㄔㄜ ㄓㄢˋ

General information
- Location: Guangfu, Hualien; Taiwan
- Coordinates: 23°39′58.9″N 121°25′16.4″E
- System: Taiwan Railway railway station
- Line: Taitung line
- Distance: 42.9 km to Hualien
- Platforms: 1 island platform 1 side platform

Construction
- Structure type: At-grade

Other information
- Station code: 034

History
- Opened: 20 November 1913

Passengers
- 2017: 164,689 per year
- Rank: 134

Services
Preceding station	Taiwan Railway	Following station
Wanrong towards Badu	Eastern Trunk line	Dafu towards Taitung
Location

Guangfu railway station (Chinese: 光復車站; pinyin: Guāngfù Chēzhàn) is a railway station located in Guangfu, Hualien, Taiwan. It is located on the Taitung line and is operated by the Taiwan Railway.

== Around the station ==
- Hualien Sugar Factory
- Matai'an Wetland Ecological Park
