= Fenglin railway station =

Railway station located in Hualien, Taiwan

Fenglin Station 鳳林車站
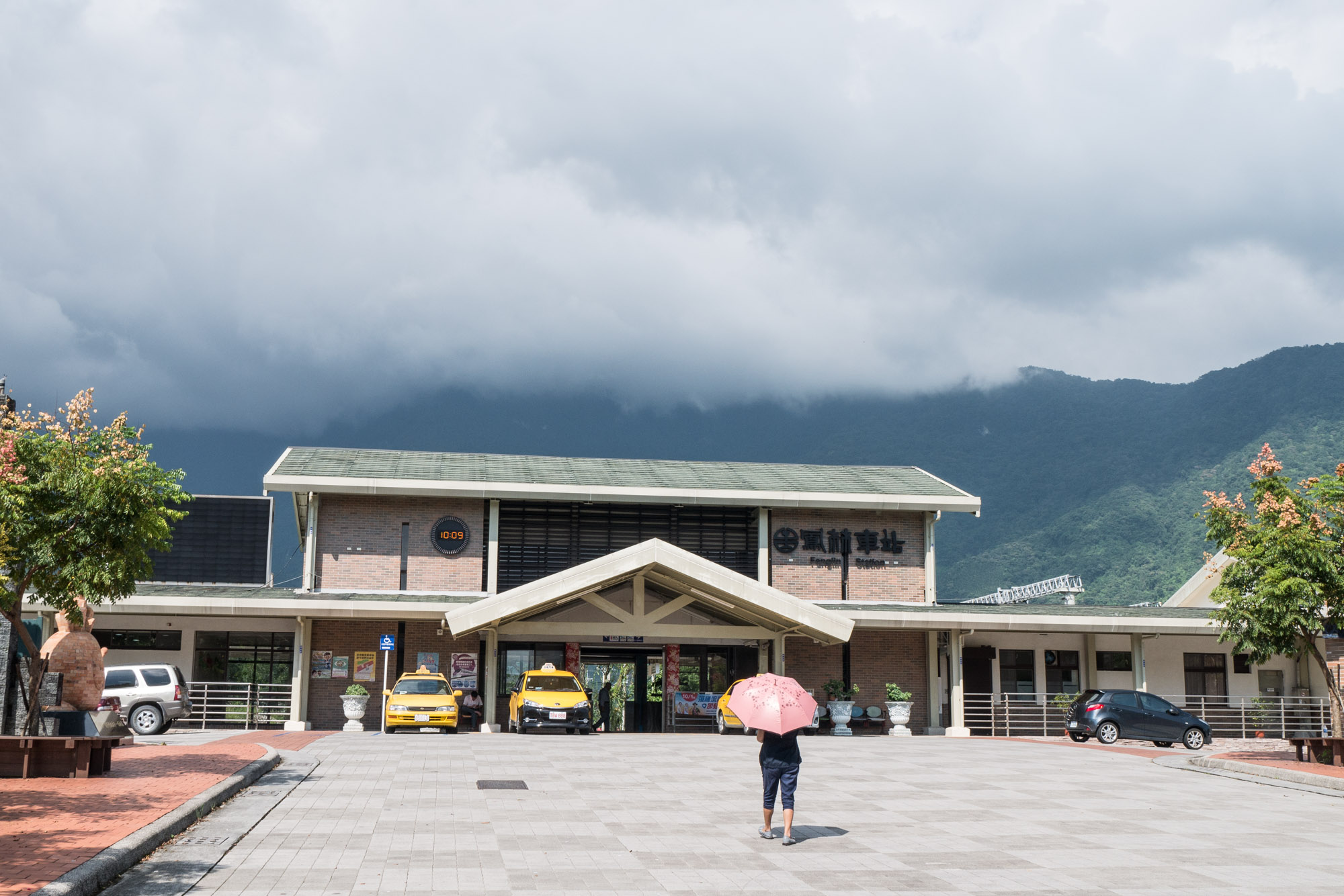

Chinese name
- Traditional Chinese: 鳳林車站
Transcriptions
Standard Mandarin
- Hanyu Pinyin: Fènglín Chēzhàn
- Bopomofo: ㄈㄥˋ ㄌㄧㄣˊ ㄔㄜ ㄓㄢˋ

General information
- Location: Fenglin, Hualien; Taiwan
- Coordinates: 23°44′47.0″N 121°26′48.8″E
- System: Taiwan Railway railway station
- Line: Taitung line
- Distance: 32.5 km to Hualien
- Platforms: 1 island platform 1 side platform

Construction
- Structure type: At-grade

Other information
- Station code: 036

History
- Opened: 25 January 1912

Passengers
- 2017: 126,100 per year
- Rank: 143

Services
Preceding station	Taiwan Railway	Following station
Nanping towards Badu	Eastern Trunk line	Wanrong towards Taitung
Location

Fenglin railway station (Chinese: 鳳林車站; pinyin: Fènglín Chēzhàn) is a railway station located in Fenglin Township, Hualien County, Taiwan. It is located on the Taitung line and is operated by the Taiwan Railway.

== Around the station ==
- Lintian Police Substation and Old Lintian Police Station
