= Lintian Police Substation and Old Lintian Police Station =

Former police station in Fenglin, Hualien County, Taiwan

- 林田警察官吏派出所及舊林田派出所
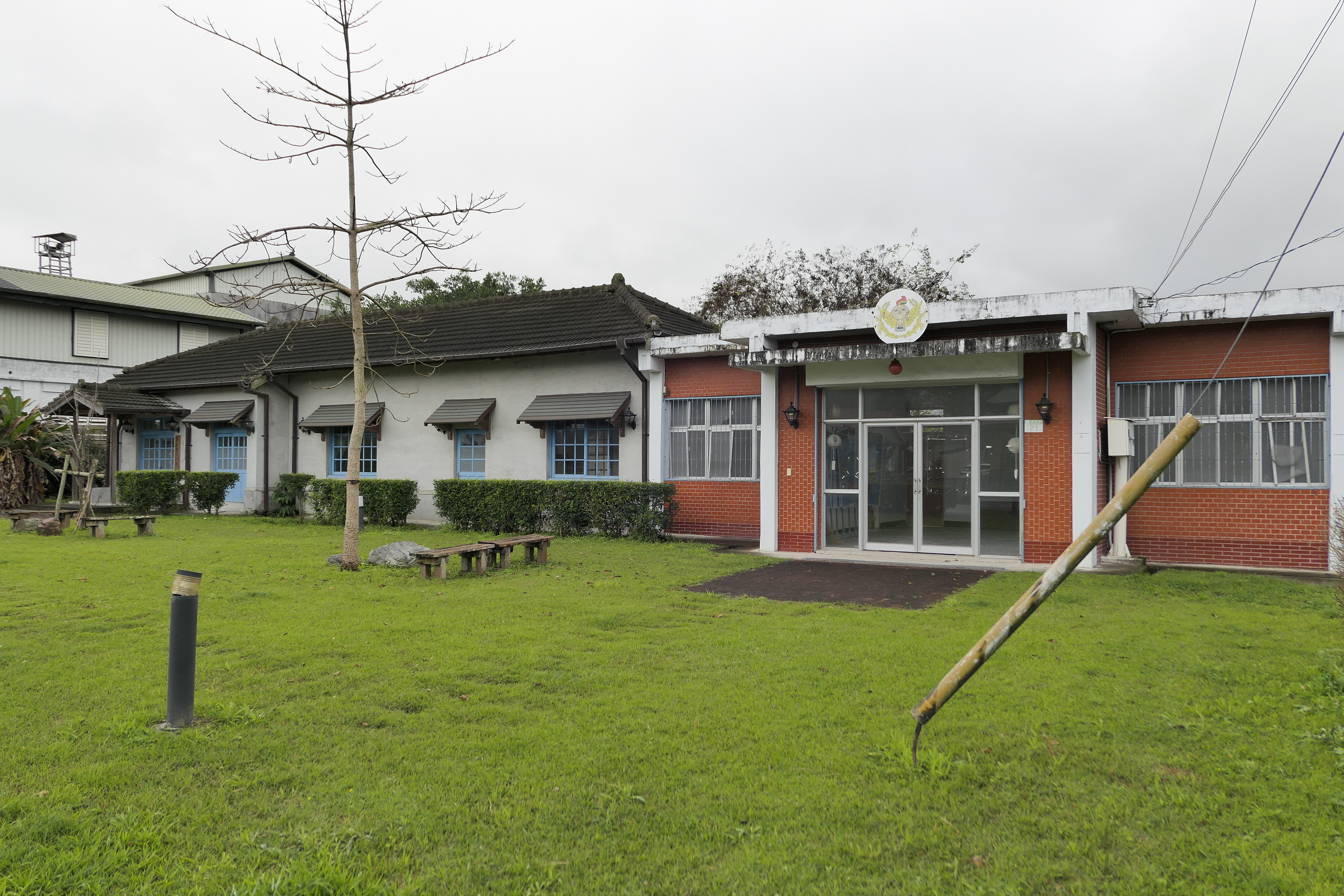
- Interactive map of the Lintian Police Substation and Old Lintian Police Station area

General information
- Type: former police station
- Location: Fenglin, Hualien County, Taiwan
- Coordinates: 23°45′09.2″N 121°28′04.3″E

Other information
- Public transit: Fenglin Station

The Lintian Police Substation and Old Lintian Police Station (traditional Chinese: 林田警察官吏派出所及舊林田派出所; simplified Chinese: 林田警察官吏派出所及旧林田派出所; pinyin: Líntián Jǐngchá Guānlì Pàichūsuǒ Jí Jiù Líntián Pàichūsuǒ) is a former police station in Fenglin Township, Hualien County, Taiwan.

== Architecture ==
The police station consists of two main buildings which was built separately, one during Japanese period and another during Republic of China period.

== Transportation ==
The building is accessible within walking distance northeast of Fenglin Station of Taiwan Railway.
