= Linrong Shin Kong railway station =

Railway station located in Hualien, Taiwan

Linrong Shin Kong Station 林榮新光車站
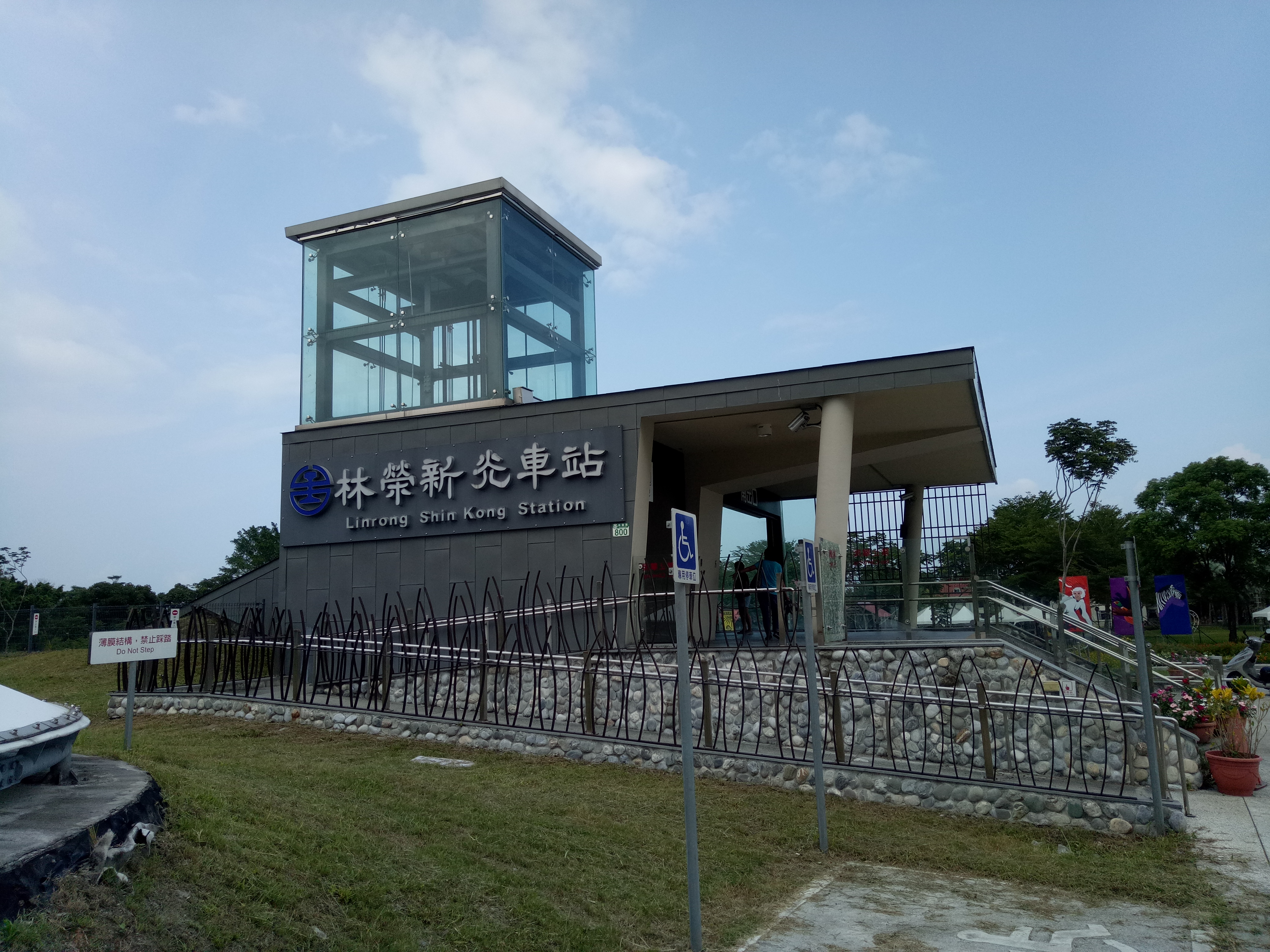

Chinese name
- Traditional Chinese: 林榮新光車站
Transcriptions
Standard Mandarin
- Hanyu Pinyin: Línróng Xīnguāng Chēzhàn
- Bopomofo: ㄌㄧㄣˊ ㄖㄨㄥˊ ㄒㄧㄣ ㄍㄨㄤ ㄔㄜ ㄓㄢˋ

General information
- Location: Fenglin, Hualien; Taiwan
- Coordinates: 23°48′07.1″N 121°27′42.5″E
- System: Taiwan Railway railway station
- Line: Taitung line
- Distance: 27.7 km to Hualien
- Platforms: 2 side platforms

Construction
- Structure type: Underground

Other information
- Station code: 038
- Classification: Simple (簡易站)

History
- Opened: 10 July 2018

Services
Preceding station	Taiwan Railway	Following station
Fengtian towards Badu	Eastern Trunk line	Nanping towards Taitung
Location

Linrong Shin Kong railway station (Chinese: 林榮新光車站; pinyin: Línróng Xīnguāng Chēzhàn) is a railway station on the Taitung line operated by Taiwan Railway. It is located in Fenglin Township, Hualien County, Taiwan, on the southern end of the Xikou Tunnel, which crosses the Shoufeng River. It is the only underground station on the Taitung line.

The station's name is a combination of Linrong, a village located nearby, and the Shin Kong Group, which owns the land around the station and financed its construction. The station is located at the entrance of Harvest Ranch and Resort, which is owned by Shin Kong.

== History ==
The original Japanese-era Taitung line, built in a 762 mm (2 ft 6 in) gauge, crossed the Shoufeng River on a bridge to the east of the current tracks. On 1 November 1918, a station named Pinglin station (平林停車場) (Note: "Pinglin" is the Mandarin Chinese pronunciation of the name; the Japanese pronunciation is unclear.) was built on the south bank of the river. In 1962, the station was renamed to Linrong station after the village it was located in.

Beginning in the 1980s, the Taitung line was rebuilt with a 1,067 mm (3 ft 6 in) gauge. During this process, a straighter route was chosen for the tracks via the Xikou Tunnel underneath the Shoufeng River, and Linrong station closed in 1982 with the opening year of the tunnel. The former station building was removed in 1988, and a park stands at its former site.

In 2011, during the planning phase of the electrification of the Taitung line, local residents and the Shin Kong Group petitioned for a new station to be built in Linrong. Locals wanted a station to replace Xikou Station, a station on the north of the river that was slated to be closed for low ridership; Shin Kong wanted a station to bring in more tourists to the Harvest Ranch and Resort. Xikou Tunnel was rebuilt in 2013, and the construction allocated space for a new station. Shin Kong financed the new station's construction, priced at NT$315,000,000. However, groundbreaking for the station was delayed until 7 December 2015 due to issues with acquiring a building permit. The station was opened on 10 July 2018.

== Services ==
Despite being classified as a "simple station", the fifth tier, Linrong Shin Kong, is served by four Puyuma Express services as well as the Chu-Kuang Express trains 1 and 2, which are excursion trains. Local trains before 8:00 AM and after 3:30 PM do not call at the station.
