= Xishan Forest Park =

Forest park in Yunnan, China

Coordinates: 24°57′31″N 102°38′06″E

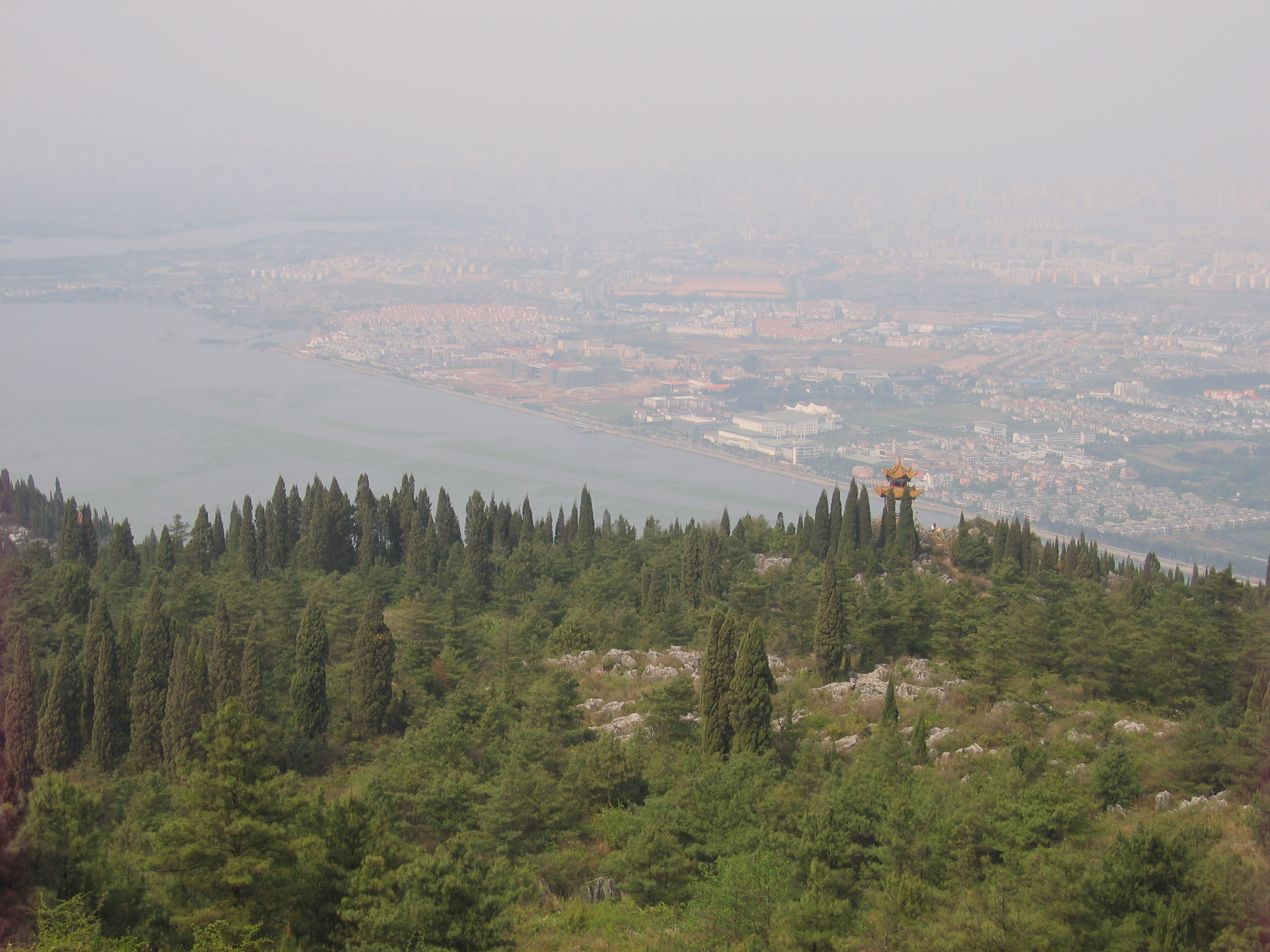
Xishan Forest Park and the view of Dian Lake

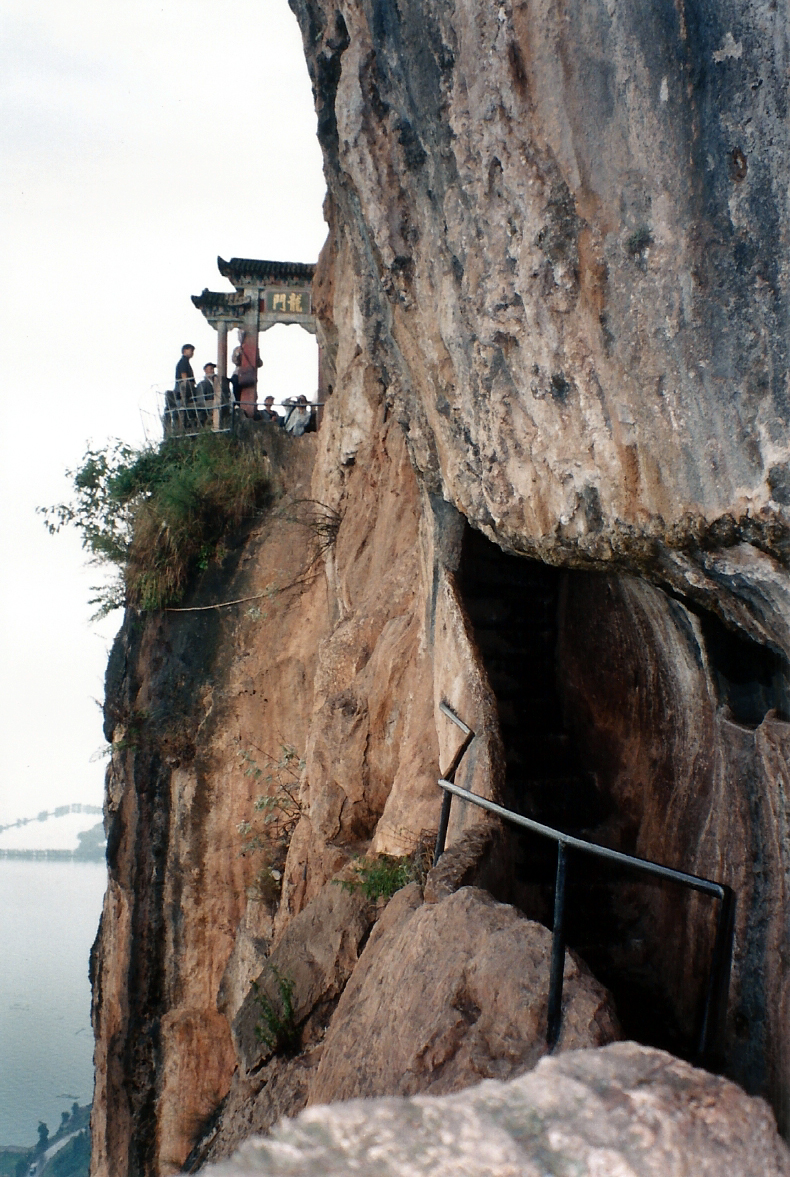
The Dragon Gate in Xishan Forest Park

Xishan Forest Park (Chinese: 西山森林公园) is a forest park located 15 kilometers west of Kunming City, Yunnan Province, China. Situated in Western Mountains (Xi Shan), which rise to the west of Dian Lake, the national park occupies an area of approximately 442 hectares. Its highest peak (Mt. Luohan) is 2507.5 meters above sea level, and about 620 meters from the water surface of Dian Lake.

There are in the forest park several scenic spots, such as the Dragon Gate (Long Men), Sanqing Ge, Huating Temple, Taihua Temple, and the tomb of Nie Er, the composer of the Chinese National Anthem and a native of Kunming.

== Transportation ==
Public bus service is available from Kunming city to the northern end of the forest park. There is also a cable car service available from the Yunnan Ethnic Village over Dian Lake to West Mountains.

== See also ==
- Forest park
- Western Mountains
