= Huadong, Guangxi =

Huadong 化峒镇
- Town
- Location in Guangxi
- Coordinates: 23°2′38″N 106°29′44″E
- Country: People's Republic of China
- Autonomous Region: Guangxi
- Prefecture-level city: Baise
- County-level city: Jingxi
- Time zone: UTC+8 (China Standard)

Huadong (Chinese: 化峒) is a town of Jingxi, Guangxi, China. As of 2018, it has 10 villages under its administration.
