= Nanping railway station =

Railway station located in Hualien, Taiwan

Nanping Station 南平車站
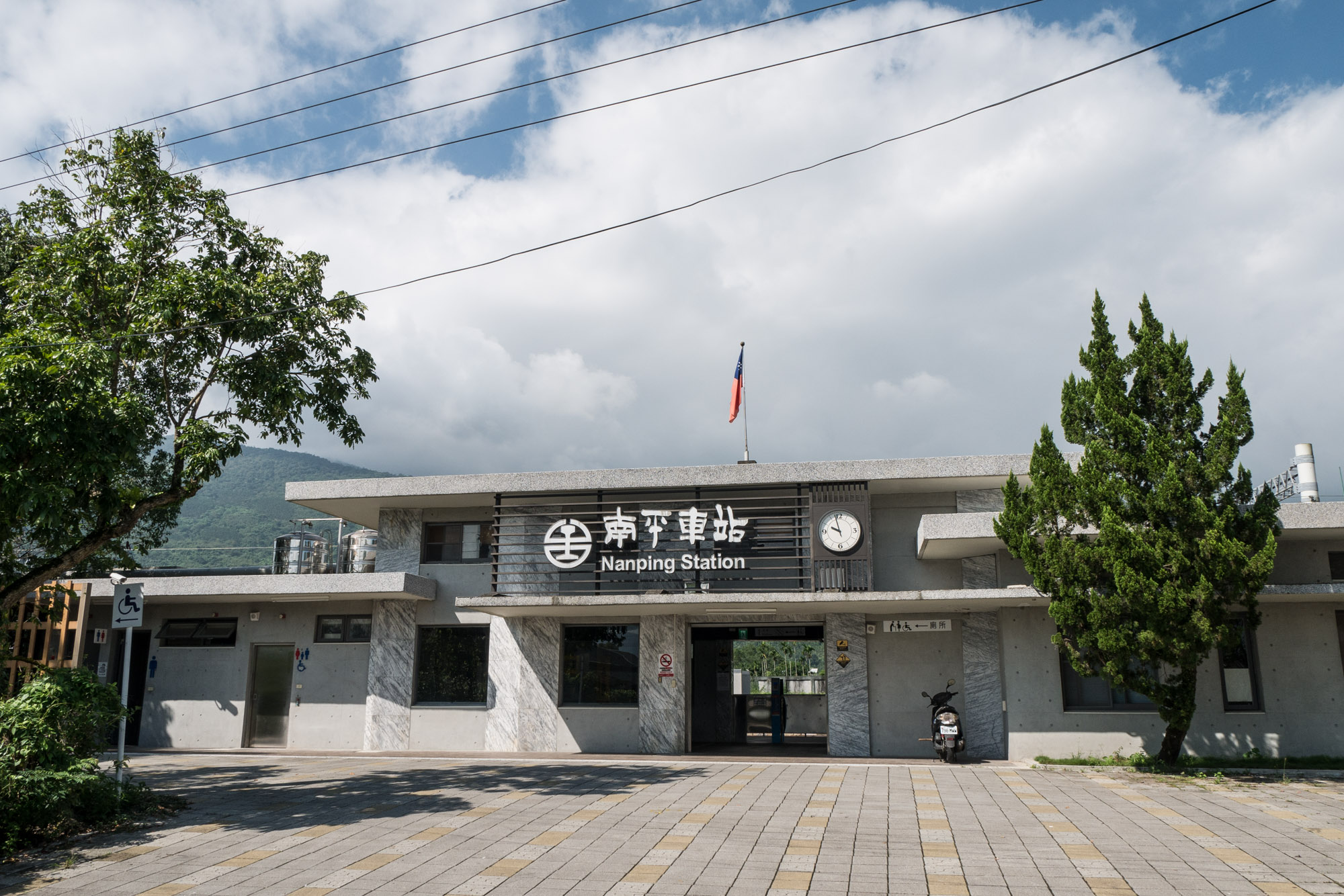

Chinese name
- Traditional Chinese: 南平車站
Transcriptions
Standard Mandarin
- Hanyu Pinyin: Nánpíng Chēzhàn
- Bopomofo: ㄋㄢˊ ㄆㄧㄥˊ ㄔㄜ ㄓㄢˋ

General information
- Location: Fenglin, Hualien; Taiwan
- Coordinates: 23°46′56.3″N 121°27′29.6″E
- System: Taiwan Railway railway station
- Line: Taitung line
- Distance: 28.4 km to Hualien
- Platforms: 1 island platform

Construction
- Structure type: At-grade

Other information
- Station code: 037

History
- Opened: 16 September 1915

Passengers
- 2017: 7,875 per year

Services
Preceding station	Taiwan Railway	Following station
Linrong Shin Kong towards Badu	Eastern Trunk line	Fenglin towards Taitung
Location

Nanping railway station (Chinese: 南平車站; pinyin: Nánpíng Chēzhàn) is a railway station located in Fenglin, Hualien, Taiwan. It is located on the Taitung line and is operated by the Taiwan Railway.
