= Dafu railway station =

Railway station located in Hualien, Taiwan

Dafu Station 大富車站
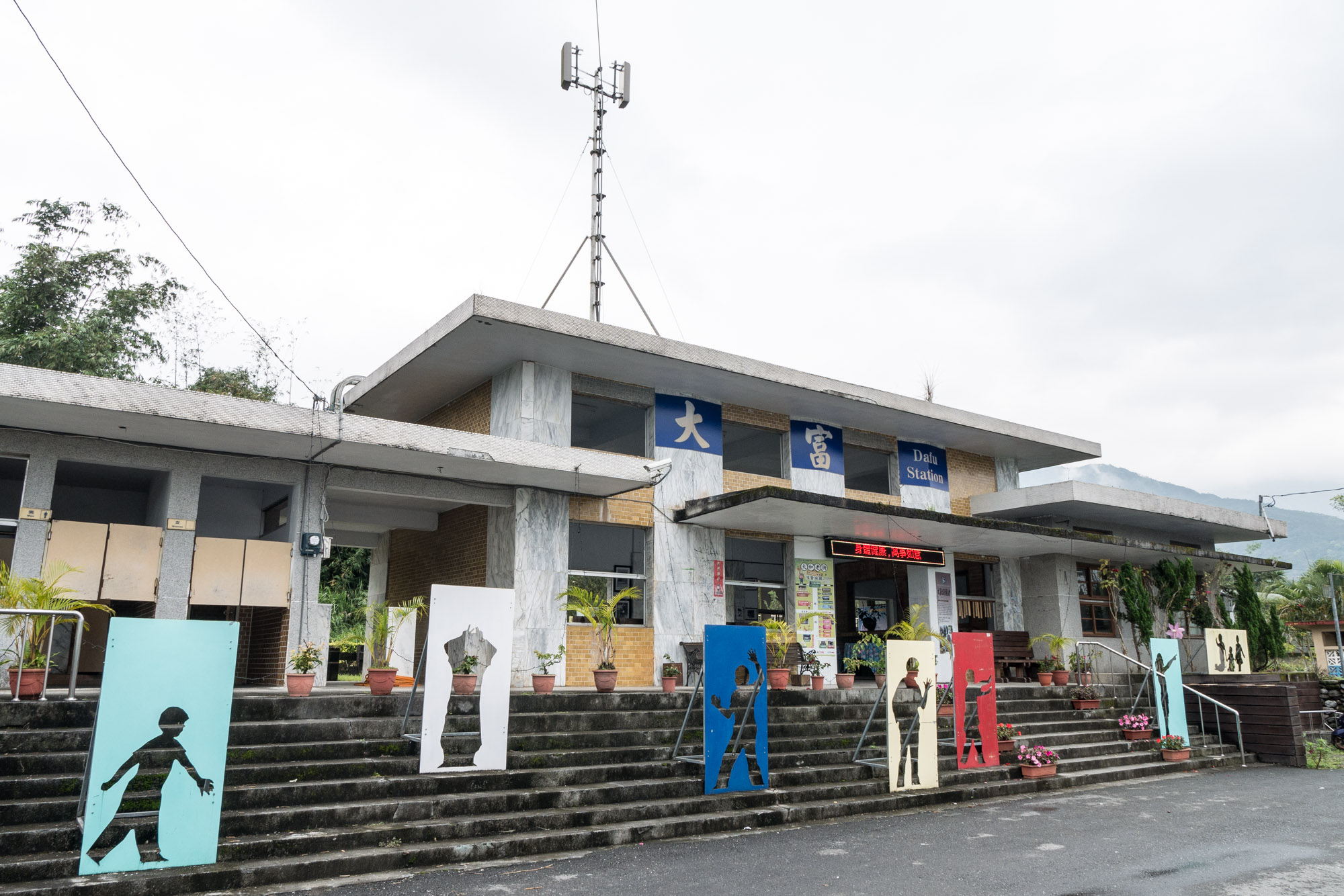

Chinese name
- Traditional Chinese: 大富車站
Transcriptions
Standard Mandarin
- Hanyu Pinyin: Dàfù Chēzhàn
- Bopomofo: ㄉㄚˋ ㄈㄨˋ ㄔㄜ ㄓㄢˋ

General information
- Location: Guangfu, Hualien; Taiwan
- Coordinates: 23°36′20.5″N 121°23′22.5″E
- System: Taiwan Railway railway station
- Line: Taitung line
- Distance: 50.6 km to Hualien
- Platforms: 1 island platform 1 side platform

Construction
- Structure type: At-grade

Other information
- Station code: 032

History
- Opened: 1 November 1918

Passengers
- 2017: 3,514 per year
- Rank: 221

Services
Preceding station	Taiwan Railway	Following station
Guangfu towards Badu	Eastern Trunk line	Fuyuan towards Taitung
Location

Dafu railway station (Chinese: 大富車站; pinyin: Dàfù Chēzhàn) is a railway station located in Guangfu Township, Hualien County, Taiwan. It is located on the Taitung line and is operated by Taiwan Railway.
