= Wanrong railway station =

Railway station located in Hualien, Taiwan

Wanrong Station 萬榮車站
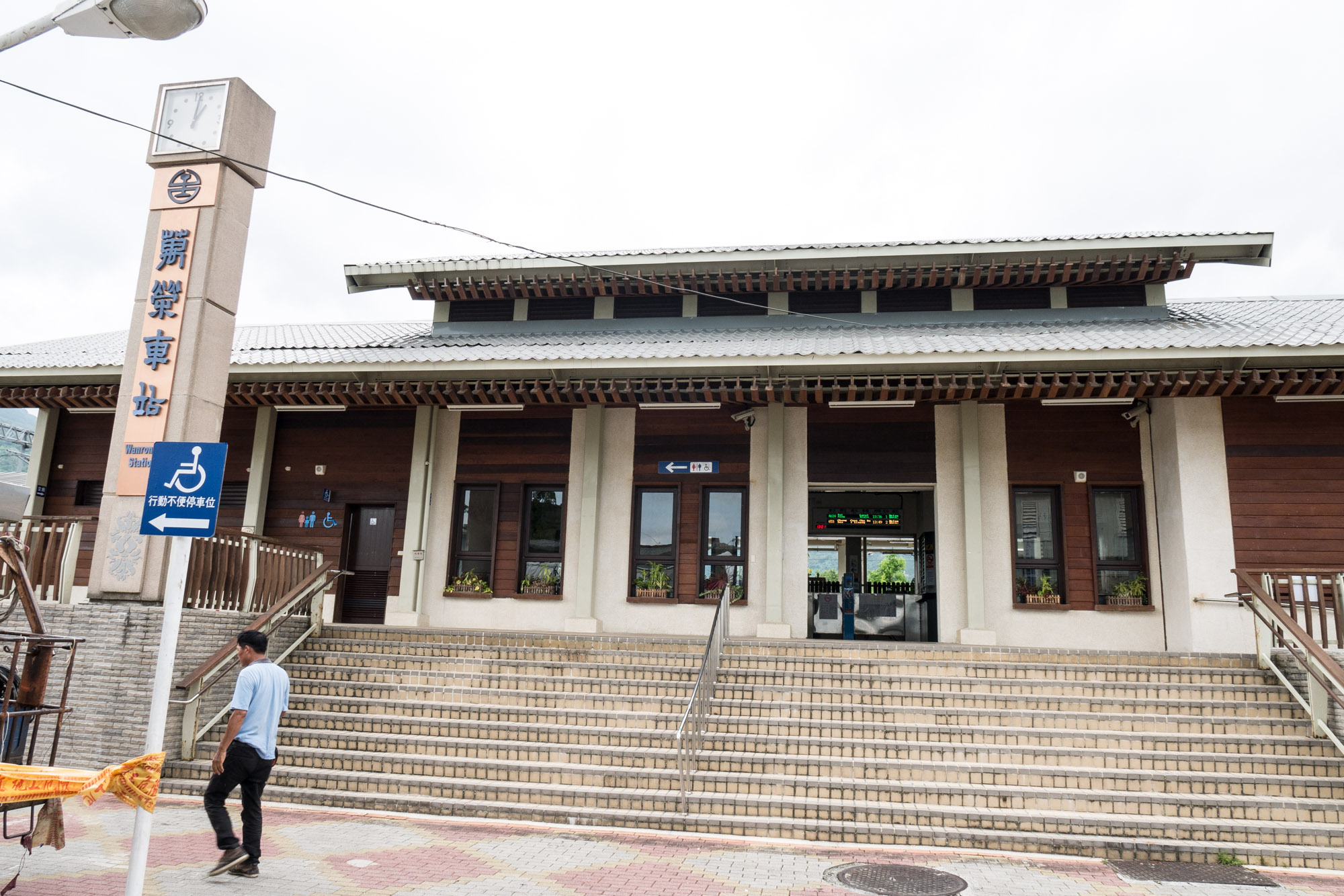

Chinese name
- Traditional Chinese: 萬榮車站
Transcriptions
Standard Mandarin
- Hanyu Pinyin: Wànróng Chēzhàn
- Bopomofo: ㄨㄢ ㄖㄨㄥˊ ㄔㄜ ㄓㄢˋ

General information
- Location: Fenglin, Hualien; Taiwan
- Coordinates: 23°42′43.1″N 121°25′08.5″E
- System: Taiwan Railway railway station
- Line: Taitung line
- Distance: 37.3 km to Hualien
- Platforms: 1 island platform 1 side platform

Construction
- Structure type: At-grade

Other information
- Station code: 035

History
- Opened: 8 March 1914

Passengers
- 2017: 19,721 per year
- Rank: 111

Services
Preceding station	Taiwan Railway	Following station
Fenglin towards Badu	Eastern Trunk line	Guangfu towards Taitung
Location

Wanrong railway station (Chinese: 萬榮車站; pinyin: Wànróng Chēzhàn) is a railway station located in Fenglin, Hualien, Taiwan. It is located on the Taitung line and is operated by the Taiwan Railway. It is named after nearby Wanrong Township.

The former Wansen line to Mt. Lintian, operated by the Forestry Bureau, used to terminate here.
