= Guangfu, Hualien =

Rural township in Hualien County, Taiwan

Guangfu Township 光復鄉 Fata'an (馬太鞍)
- Rural township
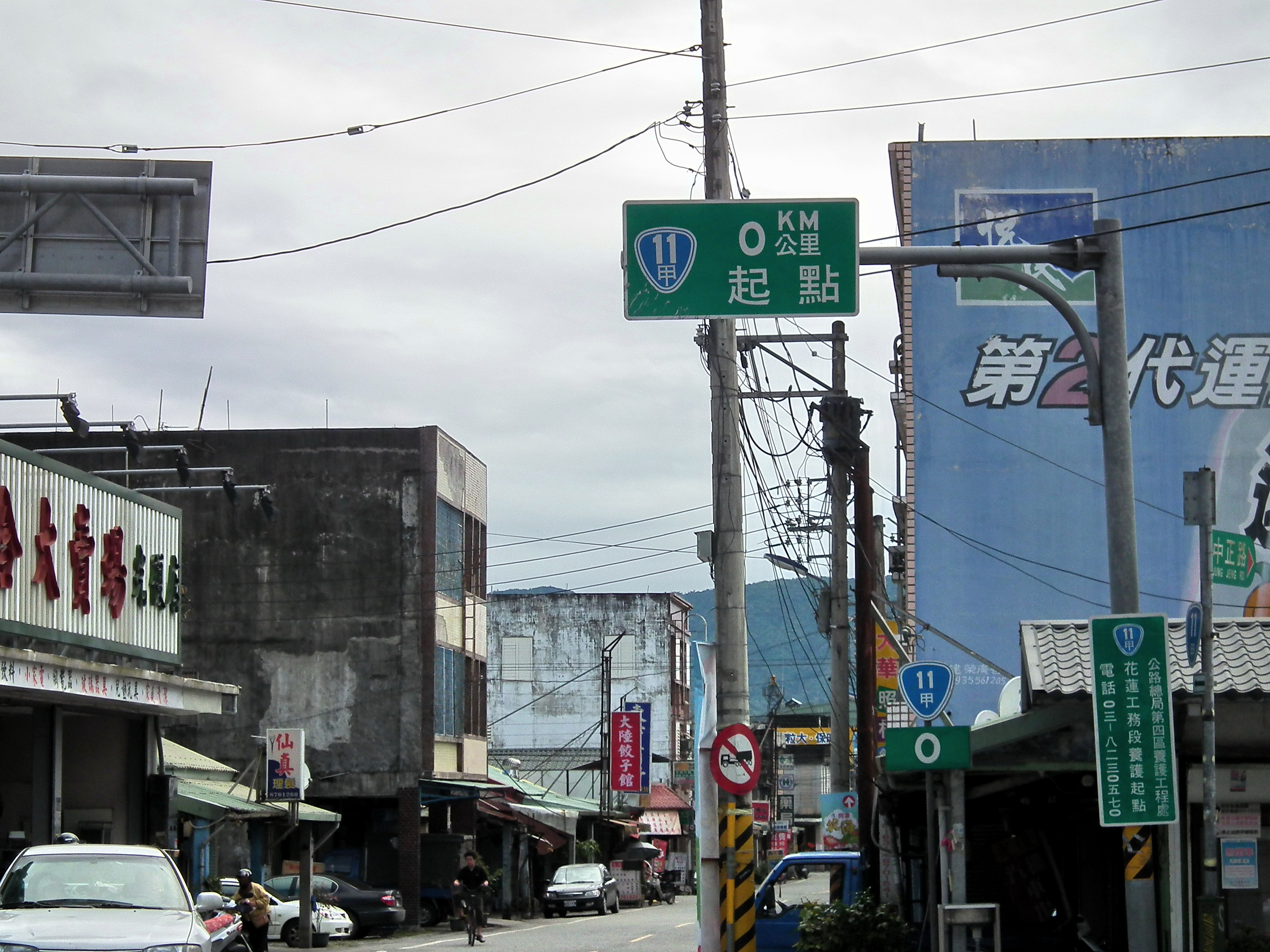

- Coordinates: 23°38′6.23″N 121°25′21.94″E
- Country: Taiwan
- Region: Eastern Taiwan

Government
  - Type: Township

Area
  - Total: 157.1100 km^{2} (60.6605 sq mi)

Population (February 2023)
  - Total: 11,975
- Time zone: UTC+8 (CST)
- Post code: 976
- Subdivision: 14 Villages
- Website: www.guangfu.gov.tw (in Chinese)

Guangfu Township (Chinese: 光復鄉; pinyin: Guāngfù Xiāng) is a rural township located in the mid-Huatung Valley of Hualien County, Taiwan. The indigenous Amis people make up about half of the population. The main economic activity is agriculture.

== History ==
In 2001, Guangfu was hit by Typhoon Toraji. 21 people are killed and about 30 persons are missing in the town of Kuang Fu, in eastern Hualien County, Taiwan. Nantou's mountainous central district and Guangfu were the two most badly affected areas in Taiwan by Toraji. Mudslides and floods swept houses, bridges, and mountain highways clear. The Agriculture Council of Taiwan reported that there could be $4 million in damage to land, livestock, and agricultural districts.

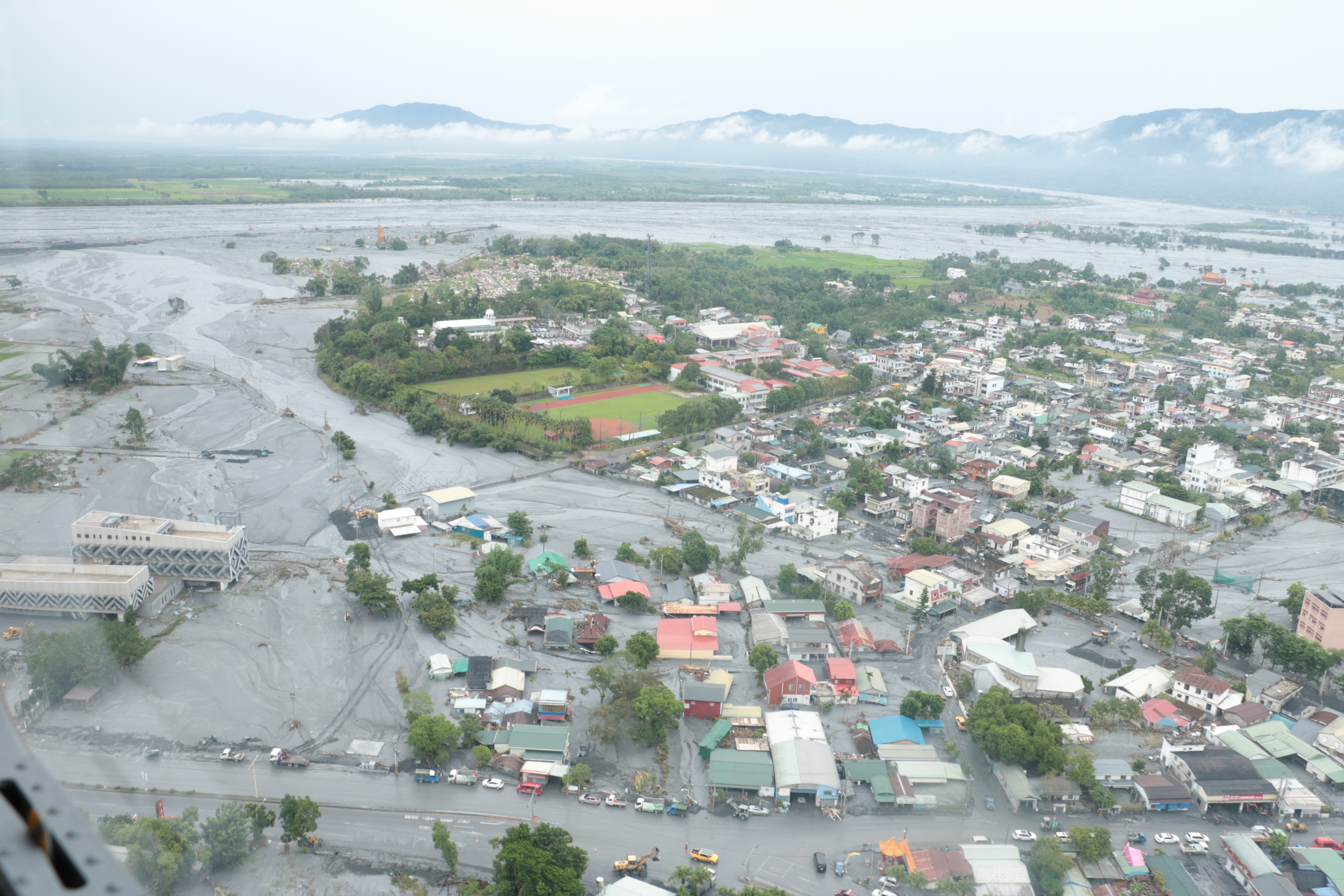
Guangfu Town inundated with mud after Matai'an Creek Barrier Lake overflowed

In 2025, the Matai'an Creek Barrier Lake, which formed following a massive landslide caused by Tropical Storm Wipha in July, overflowed due to the increased rainfall caused by Typhoon Ragasa, sweeping away a bridge and several vehicles along Provincial Highway 9 and causing flooding in Guangfu, Fenglin and Wanrong Townships. Several areas were buried in up to 5 m (16 ft) of mud. At least 19 people were killed, 107 were injured, six were missing and 300 were stranded by this event. Authorities said that 60 million tonnes of the lake's total water volume of about 91 million tonnes was discharged, while 60% of Guangfu's population, equivalent to 5,200 people, were forced to seek shelter in the higher floors of their residences. The extent of the disaster led to it being characterised as "a tsunami from the mountains". Around 4,000 people in the area lost access to water supply.

== Geography ==
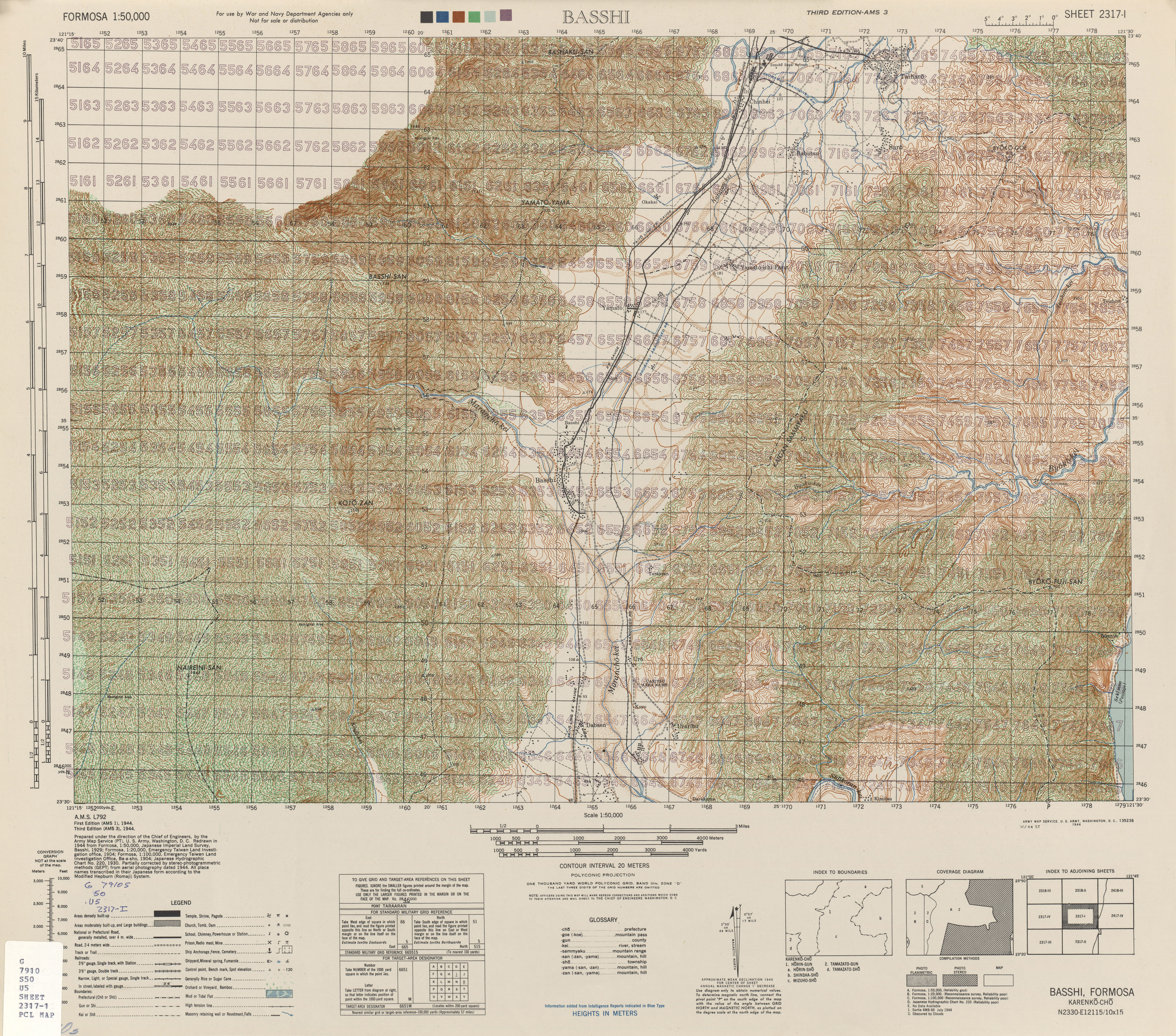
Map including Guangfu area (1944)

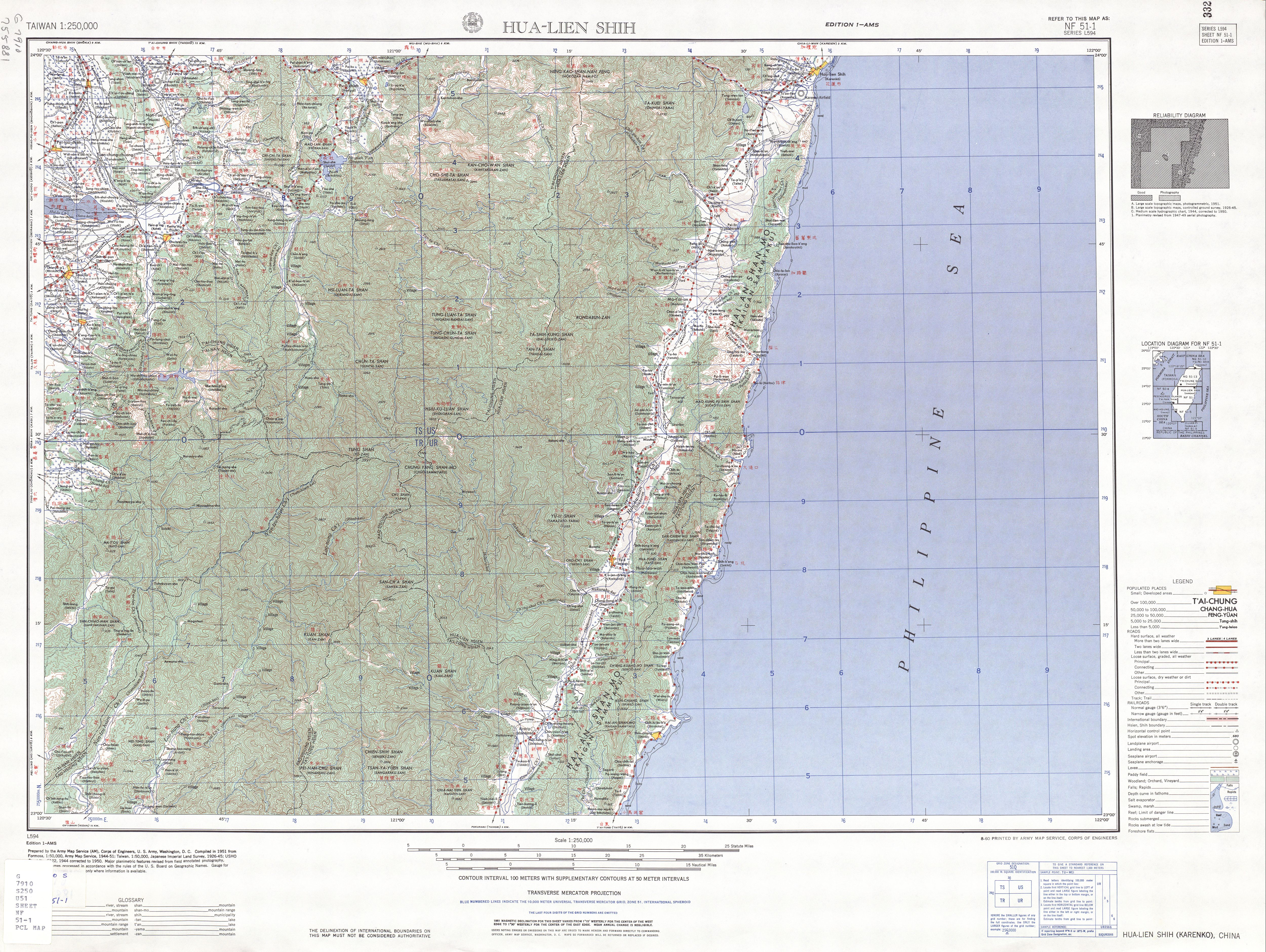
Map including Guangfu area (1951)

The township is located at the Huatung Valley.

== Administrative divisions ==
The township has 14 villages with a population of 11,975 inhabitants. Dahua, Daan, Daping, Dama, Datong, Tungfu, Xifu, Nanfu, Beifu, Dajin, Daquan, Daxing, Dafu and Dafeng Village.

== Politics ==
In February 2011, town mayor Huang Rong Chen 黃榮成 was arrested along with two other mayoral election candidates, all three were of Kuomintang (KMT), for election fraud and collusion during the 2010 mayoral election in Guangfu. Huang was alleged to have bribe villagers at NT1000 per vote to vote for him with several villagers confirming receiving the bribe. The 2010 township mayoral election was then declared invalid.

In March, a by-election was held to vote in a new mayor for the vacated seat. Xie Chong Yuan 謝忠淵 of KMT was voted in with 26.25% of the votes.

== Transportation ==
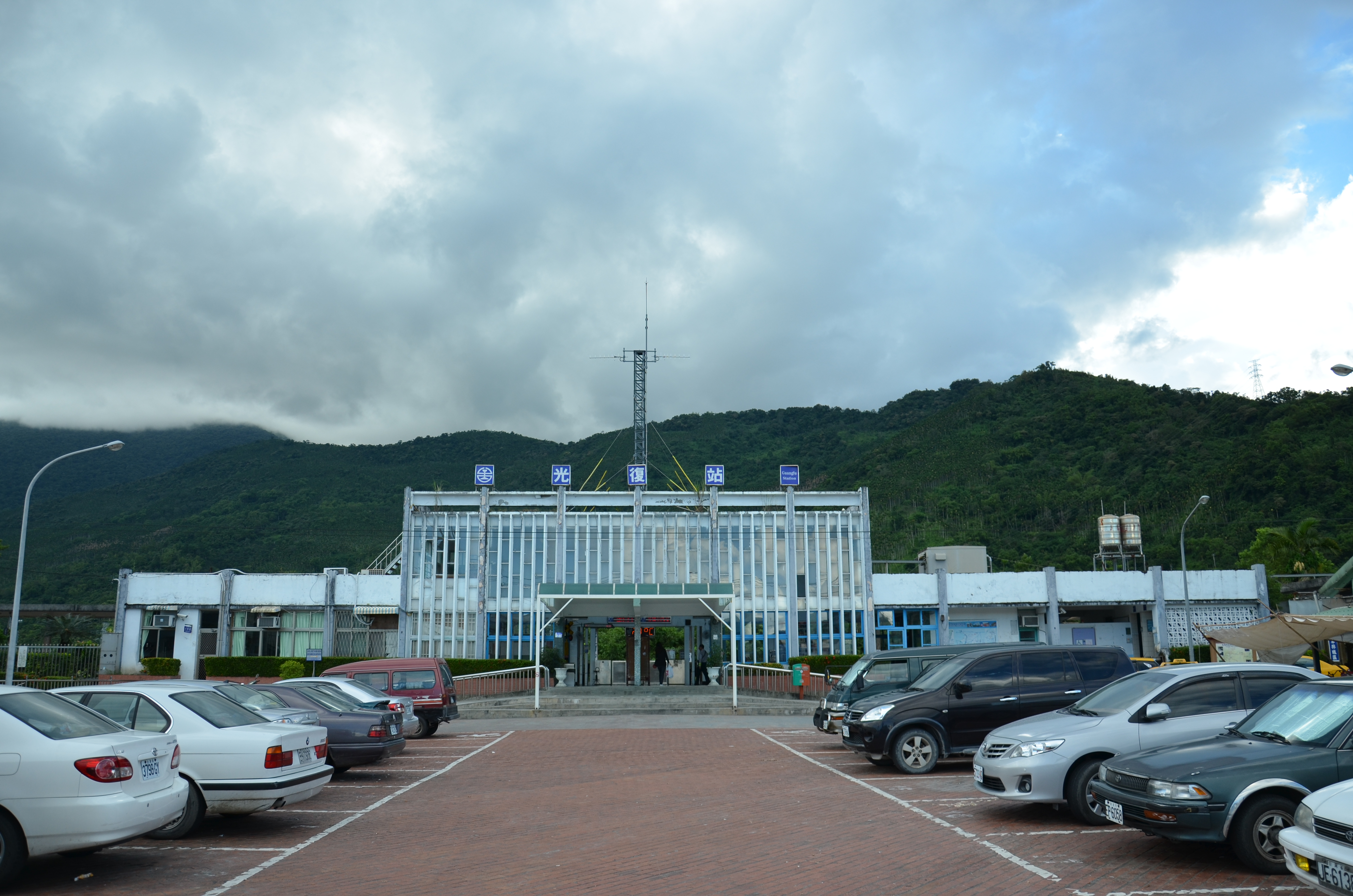
Guangfu Station

- Taiwan Railway Guangfu and Dafu Station (Taitung line)
- Provincial Highway No.9 (Hualien-Taitung Provincial Highway)
- Provincial Highway No.11A (Guangfu-Fengbin)
- County Road No.193

== Notable natives ==
- Lin Chiung-ying, football and futsal player
