= Huadong Highway =

Section of highway in Taiwan

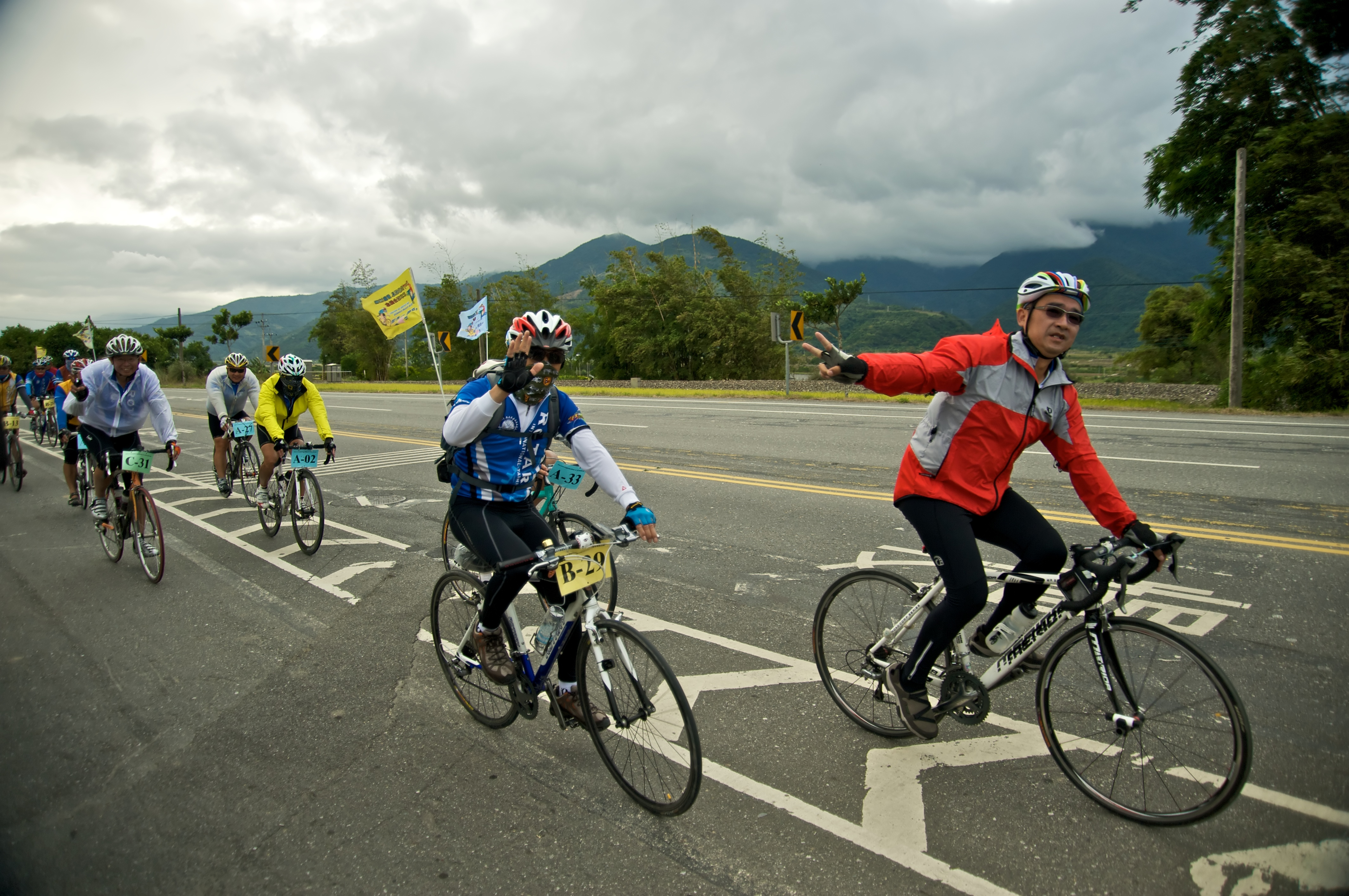
Bicyclists tour on the Huatung Highway

Huatung Highway (Chinese: 花東公路; pinyin: Huādōng Gōnglù) is a section of the Provincial Highway No. 9 in Taiwan. It starts at Hualien City and ends at Taitung City, thus its name. The highway runs the entire length of the Huatung Valley and is flanked by the Central Mountain Range and the Coastal Mountain Range. It was built by the Japanese government in 1933.

== Gallery ==
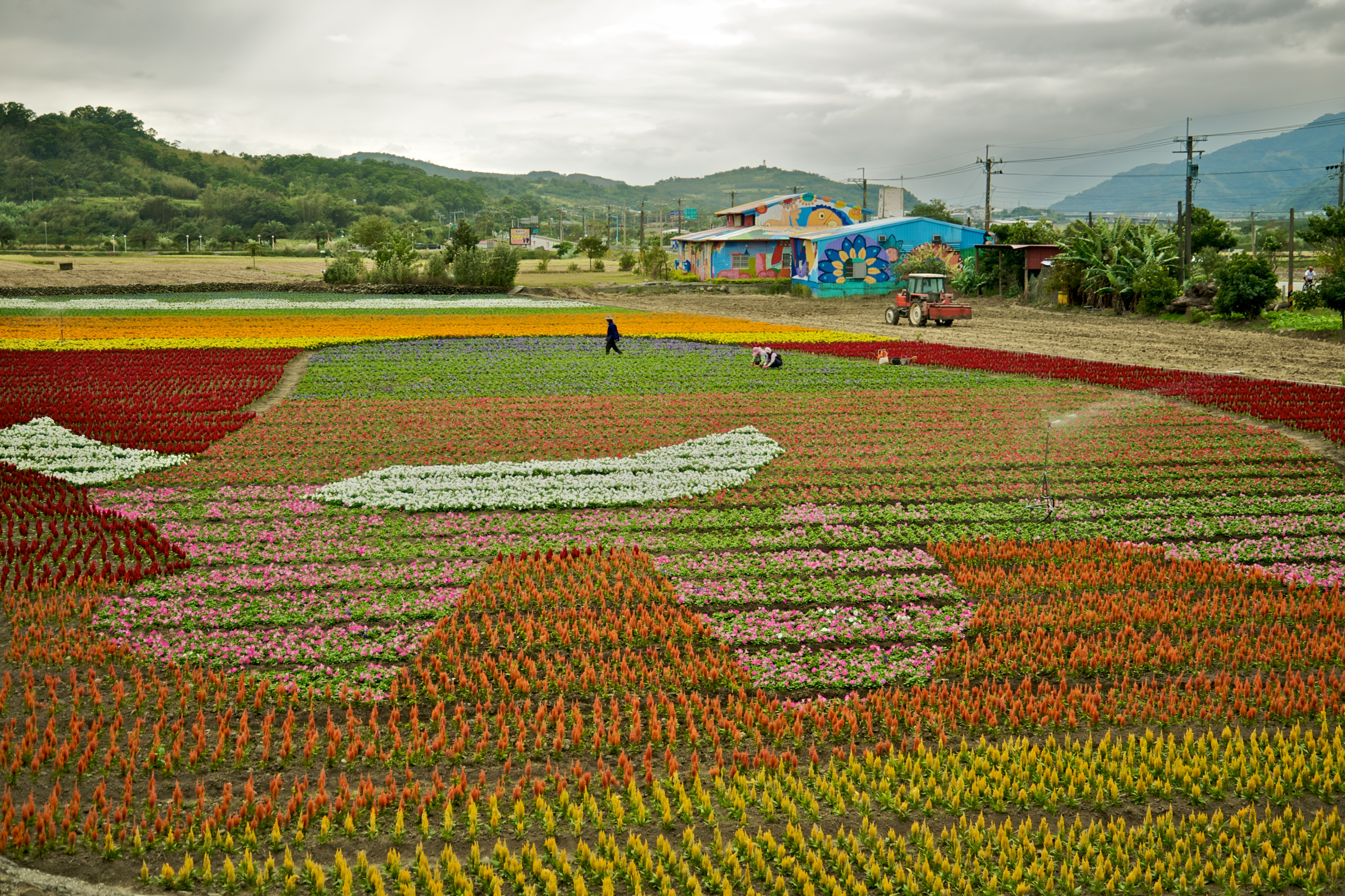
Farmers paint with flowers by the highway

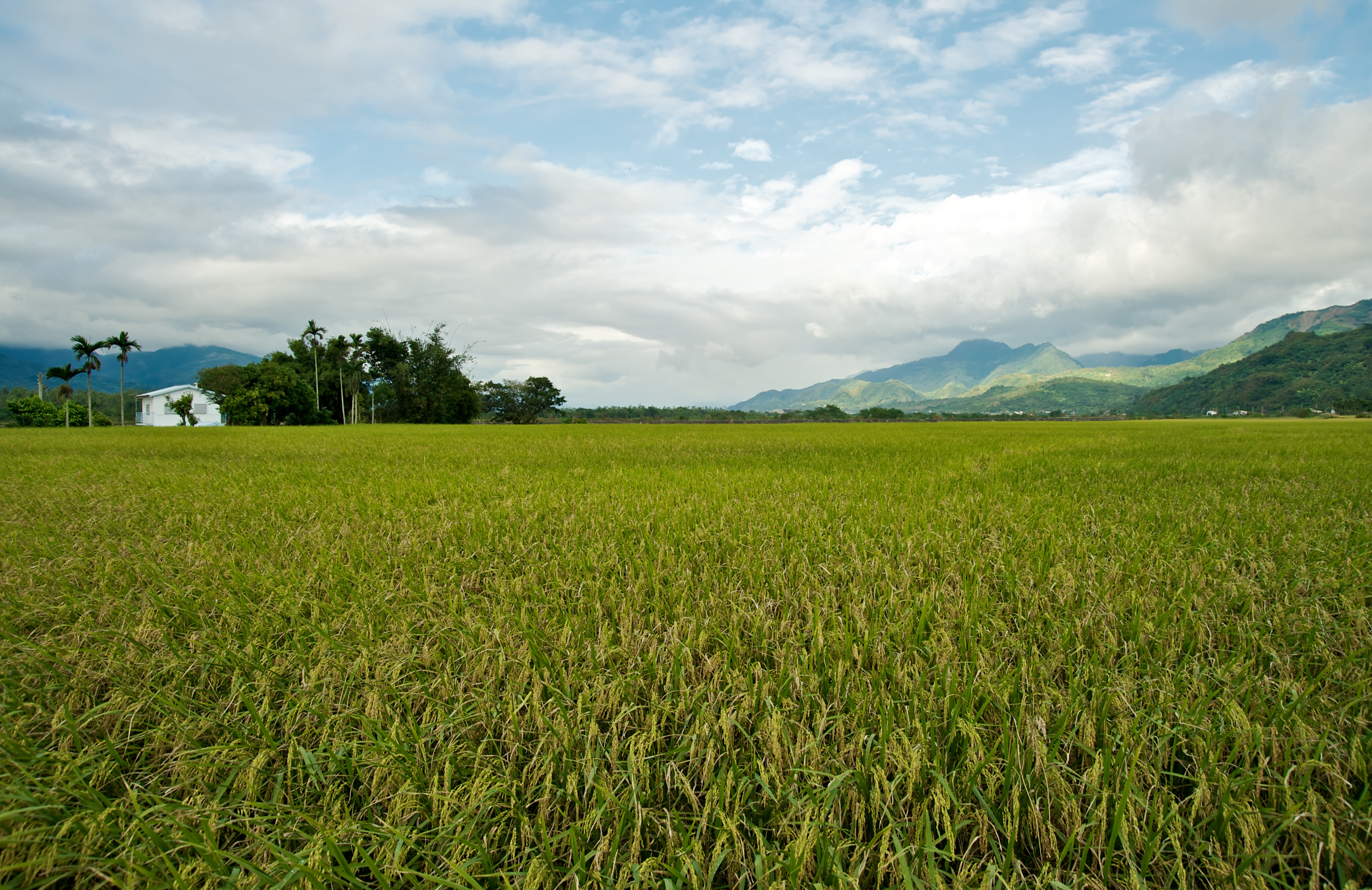
Rice paddy by the highway

== See also ==
- Highway system in Taiwan
