= Huadong Valley =

Valley in Eastern Taiwan

- The Huadong Valley (in green) between the Central Mountain Range and the Coastal Mountain Range
- Length: 180 km (110 mi)

Geology
- Type: Valley

Geography
- Location: Taiwan
- Coordinates: 23.439959°N 121.362076°E
- Interactive map of Huadong Valley

The Huadong Valley or Hualien–Taitung Valley (Chinese: 花東縱谷; pinyin: Huādōng Zònggǔ; Wade–Giles: Hua^{1}-tung^{1} Tsung^{4}-ku^{3}), also known as East Longitudinal Valley, or as the Nakasendō Plain (中仙道平野, Nakasendō Heiya) during the era of Japanese rule, is a long and narrow valley located between the Central Mountain Range and the Coastal Mountain Range of eastern Taiwan, stretching about 180 km (110 mi) from Hualien City in the north to Taitung City in the south.

The valley is believed to be part of the northern terminus of the Philippine Mobile Belt, a complex collection of tectonic plate fragments and volcanic intrusions. The valley is formed by the alluvial plains of three large river systems, namely the Hualien River, Xiuguluan River and Beinan River, all of which flow into the Pacific Ocean.

The Huadong Highway, a section of Provincial Highway No. 9, runs the entire length of the valley from north to south.

== Gallery ==
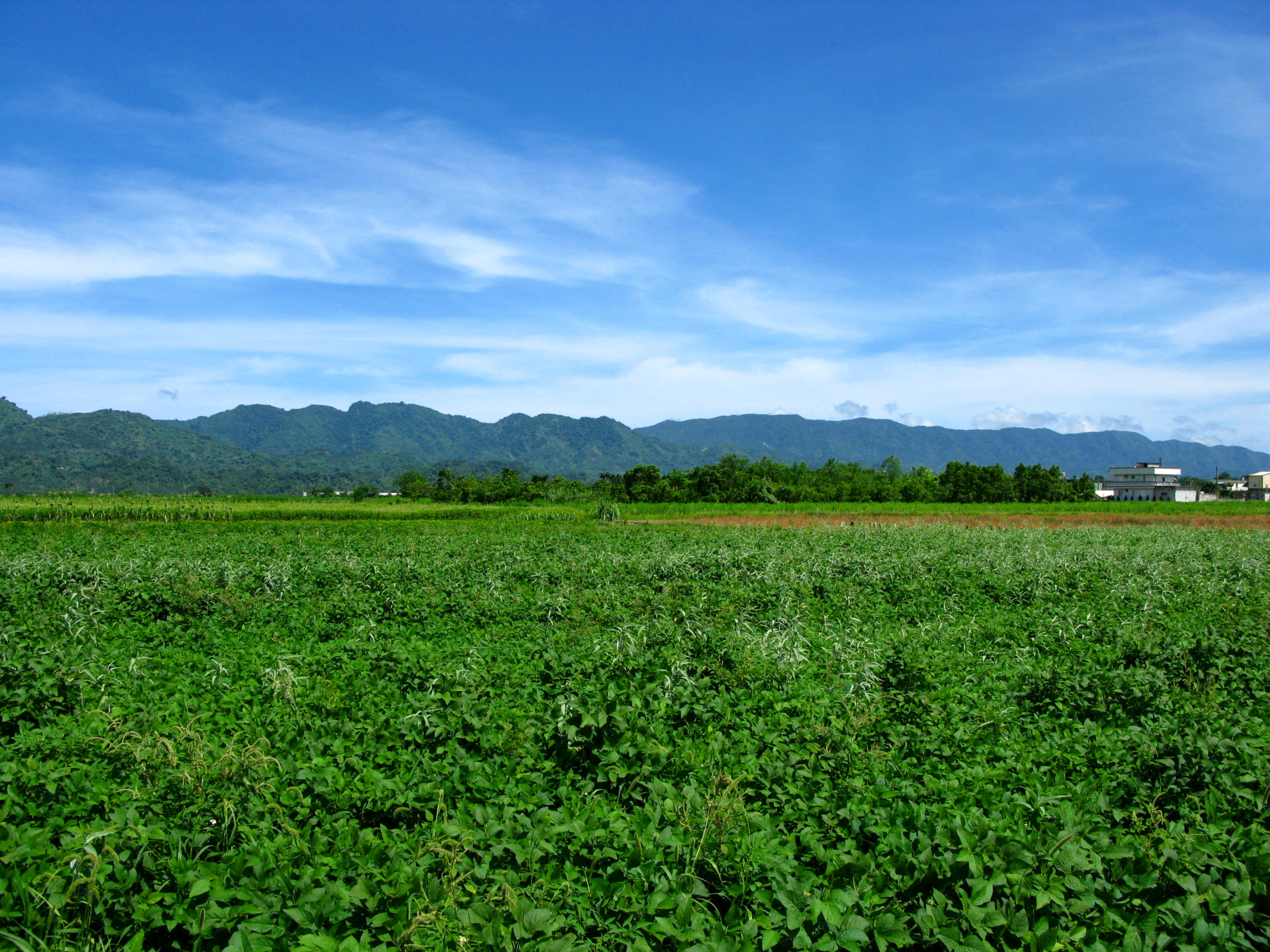
Huadong Valley, the Coastal Mountain Range can be seen in the distance

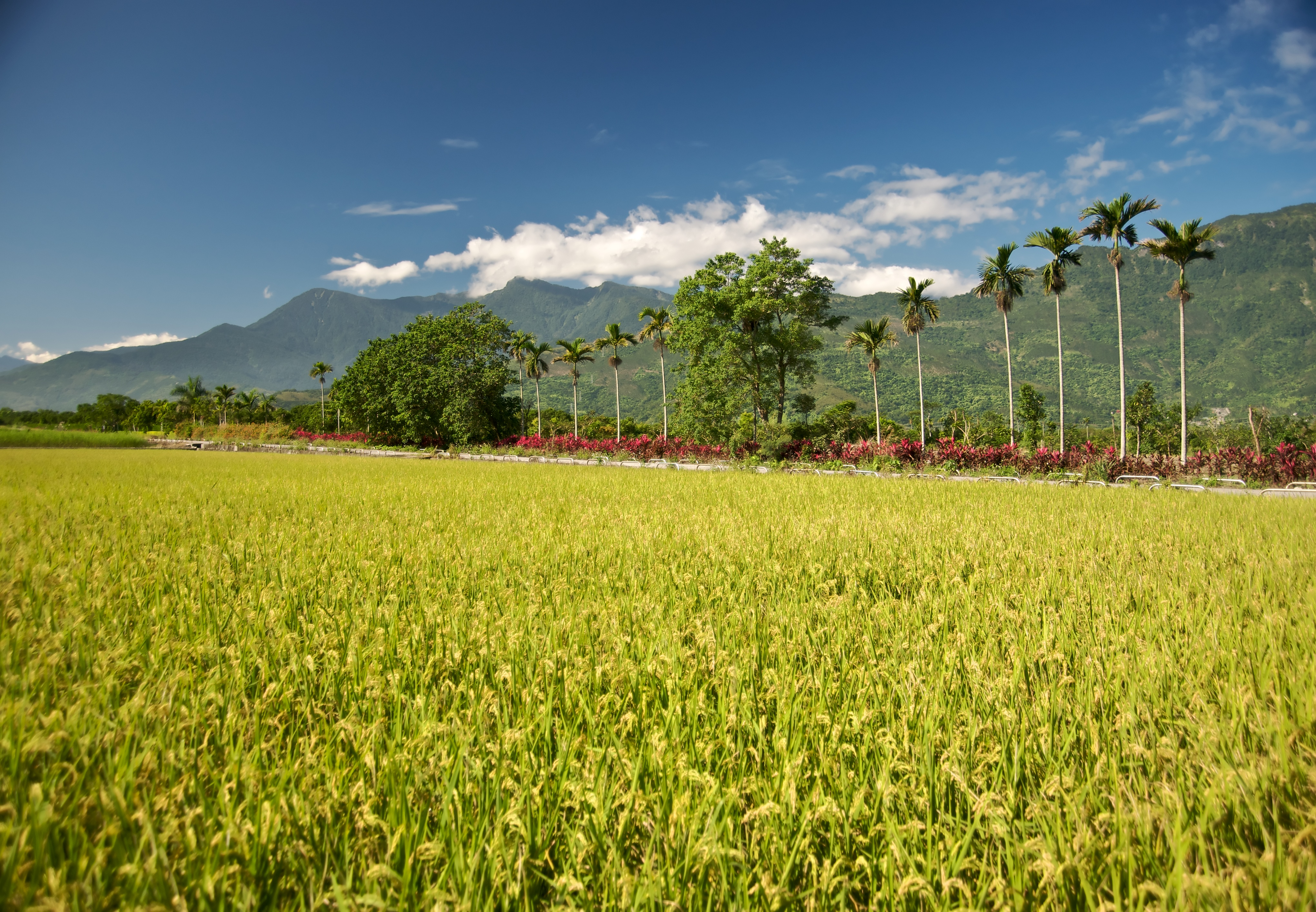
Rice paddy in Fengli, Shoufeng Township

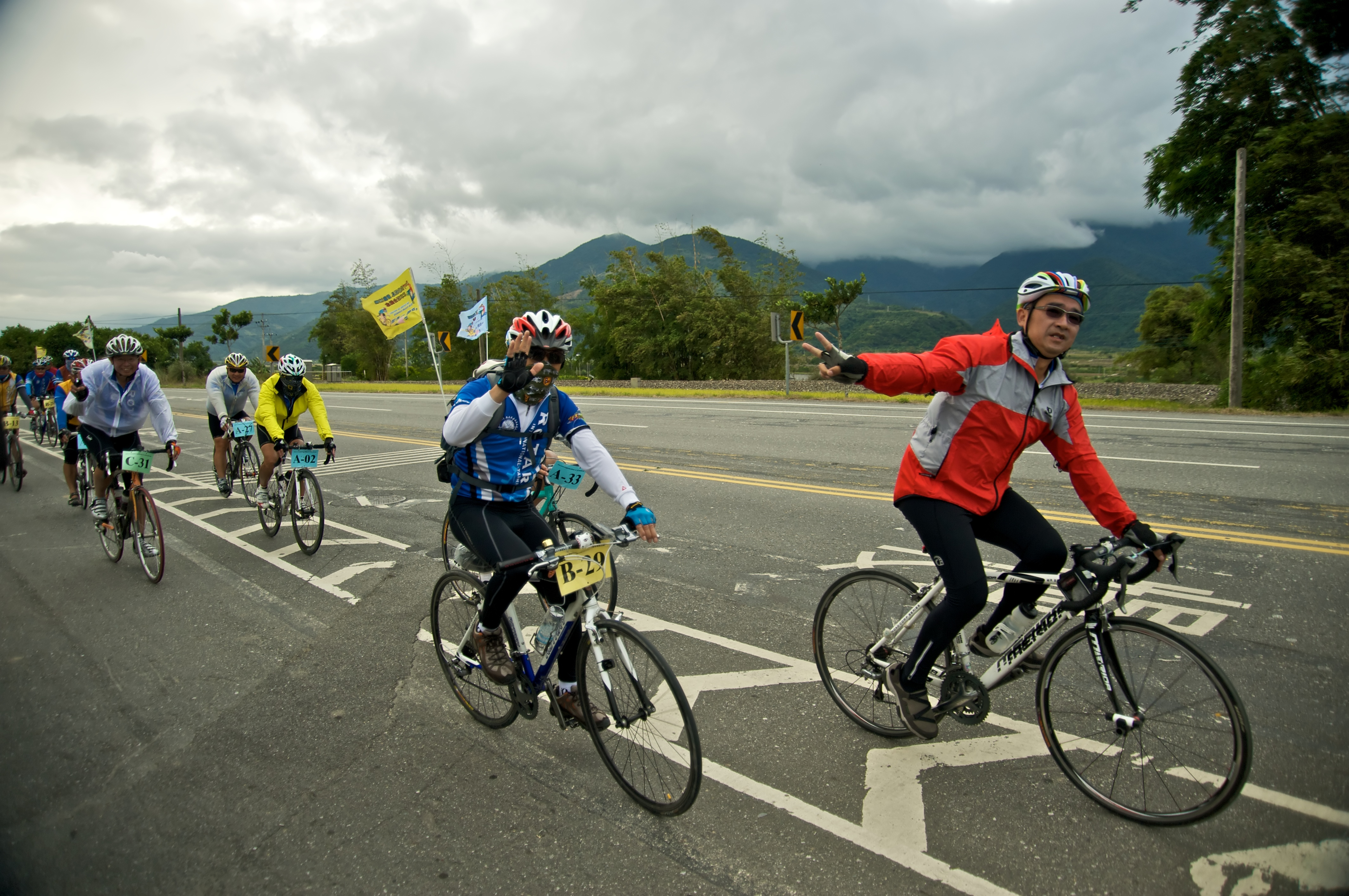
Bicyclists on Highway 23 in Fuli Township

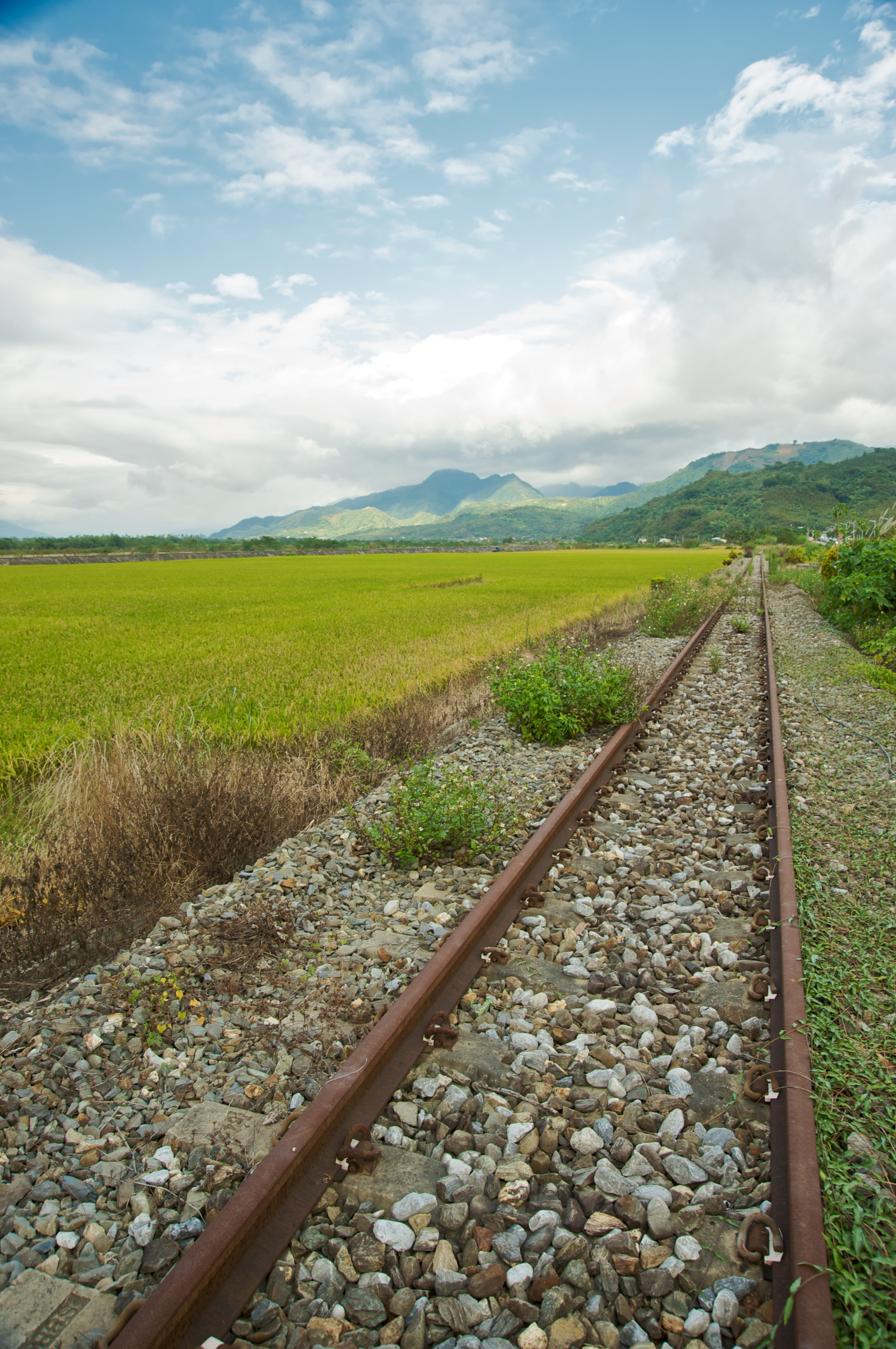
Decommissioned railway tracks by the Huadong Highway in Ruisui Township

== See also ==
- Geology of Taiwan
