= 2022 Taitung earthquakes =

Earthquakes in Taiwan

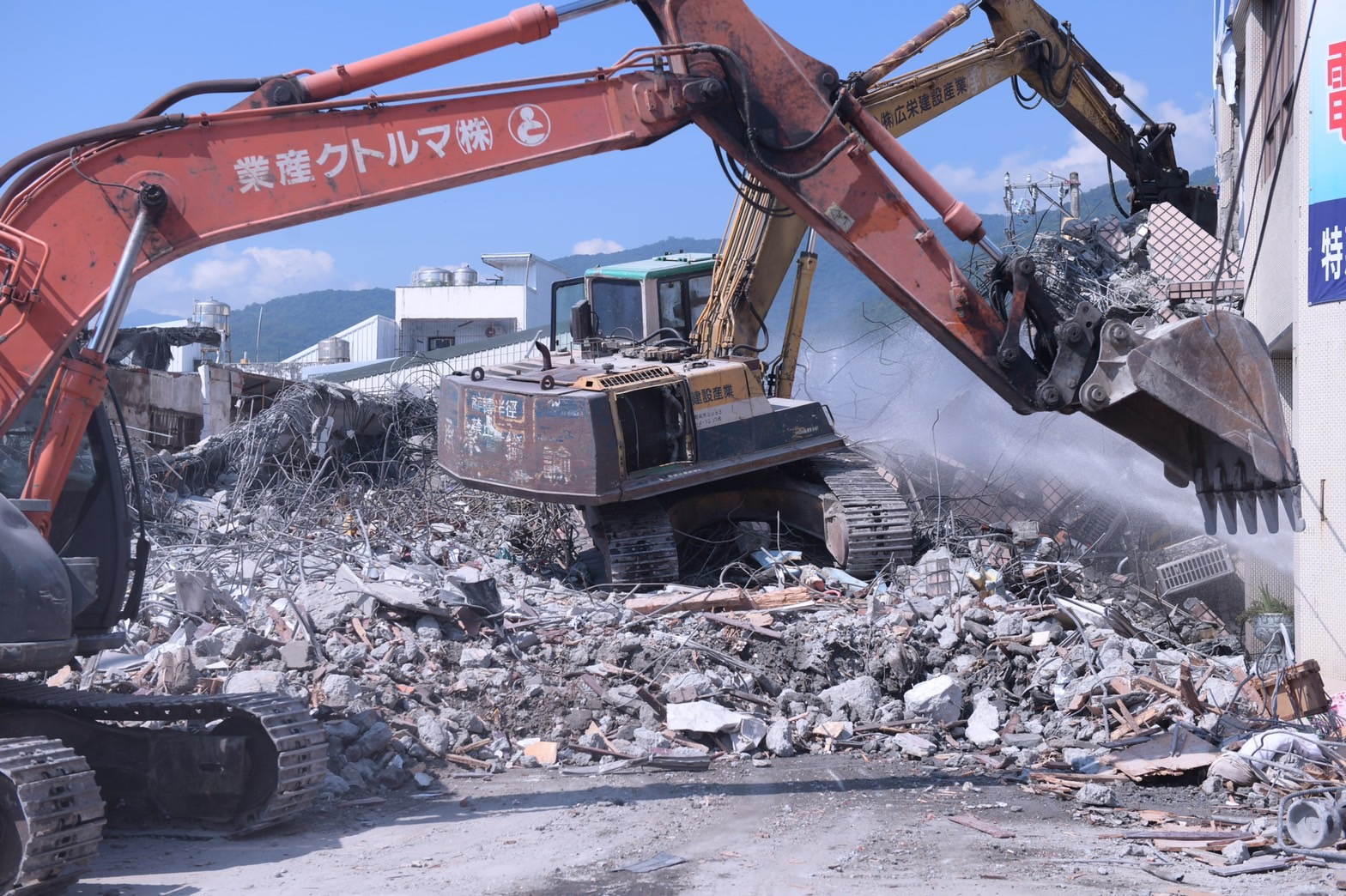
- An excavator clearing building wreckage

- Location within Taiwan
- UTC time: 2022-09-17 13:41:17; 2022-09-18 06:44:14
- ISC event: 624819634; 624819865
- USGS-ANSS: ComCat; ComCat
- Local date: September 17, 2022; September 18, 2022
- Local time: 21:41:17 (UTC+8); 14:44:15 (UTC+8)
- Magnitude: 6.5 M_{w}; 6.9 M_{w}
- Depth: 7.3 km (4.5 mi) (foreshock) 7 km (4.3 mi) (mainshock)
- Epicenter: 23.155°N 121.361°E
- Type: Oblique–slip
- Areas affected: Taiwan Province (Changhua, Chiayi, Hualien, Nantou, Pingtung, Taitung and Yunlin Counties)
- Max. intensity: CWA 6+; MMI IX (Violent)
- Peak acceleration: 0.51 g
- Tsunami: 0.41 m (1.3 ft)
- Aftershocks: Some. Strongest is 5.6 M_{w}
- Casualties: 1 dead, 179 injured

Two earthquakes affected Taitung and Hualien Counties, Taiwan within hours of each other. The first earthquake struck Taitung on September 17, 2022, occurring with a magnitude of 6.5 M_{w}, causing minor damage and some injuries. The second earthquake occurred roughly a day after the first tremor struck the same area, with a stronger magnitude of 6.9 M_{w}. Both earthquakes had maximum Modified Mercalli intensities of VII (Very strong) and IX (Violent), respectively.

== Tectonic setting ==
Taiwan lies on the boundary between the Eurasian plate and the Philippine Plate, which converge at 80 mm per year. The island is the result of uplift caused by the collision between the northern end of the Luzon Arc and the continental margin of mainland China.

== Earthquakes ==
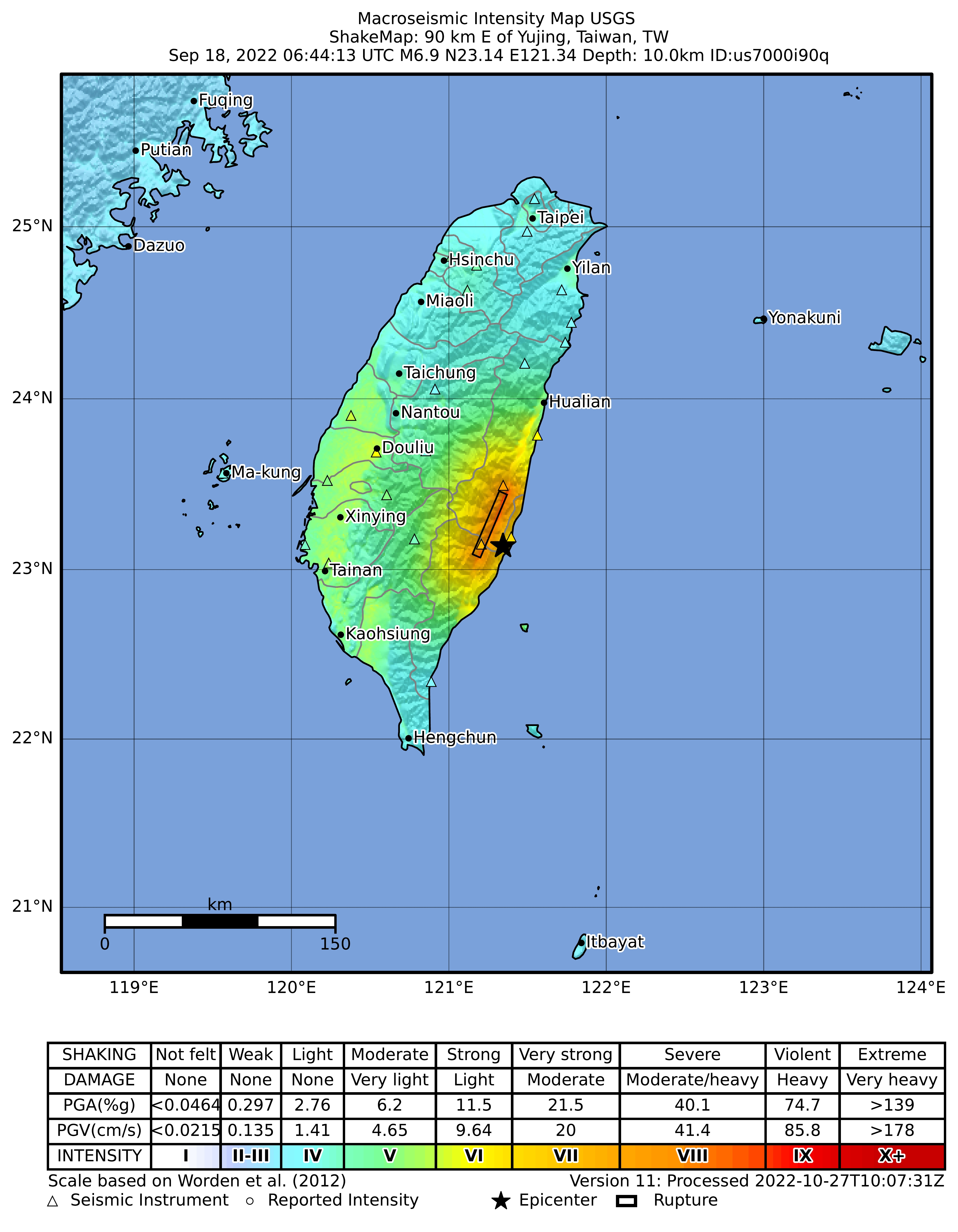
USGS Shakemap

The earthquakes were the result of shallow oblique-slip faulting. An analysis of both focal mechanisms suggest the earthquakes ruptured along a shallow WNW-dipping, SSW–NNE-striking sinistral fault or steep SSW–dipping, east-oriented oblique-dextral fault. Prior to the mainshock event, seismologists in Taiwan said it was produced along an unknown fault that was likely unstudied. The epicenter location suggest a fault located along the west side of the Huadong Valley, responsible for thrusting the Central Mountain Range. The earthquake was attributed to continental collision between the Philippine Sea and Eurasian plate.

=== Foreshocks ===
The largest foreshock occurred on 17 September, measuring 6.4 M_{L} by the Central Weather Bureau (CWB). It struck at a depth of 7.3 km (4.5 mi) and had a maximum CWB seismic intensity of 6+. After the mainshock, the 17 September earthquake and 70 subsequent shocks recorded later were reassigned as "foreshocks". The Earthquake Prediction Center of the CWB said that 73 foreshocks were recorded, which is a rare occurrence. Five foreshocks had magnitudes larger than 5.0.

It was felt strongly at Quanzhou, Xiamen in Fujian Province and Hangzhou in Zhejiang Province. The Hong Kong Observatory received 10 reports of people feeling shaking; an analysis indicated it was felt with a maximum Modified Mercalli intensity of III.

=== Mainshock ===
The United States Geological Survey reported that it had a moment magnitude of 6.9, which was downgraded from an initial 7.2. although the Japan Meteorological Agency reported that it had a magnitude (M_{JMA}) of 7.3. The Central Weather Bureau reported that it measured 6.8 on the Richter magnitude scale. It is considered the largest onshore earthquake in Taitung county since 1973.

=== Tsunami warnings ===
The Japan Meteorological Agency issued a tsunami advisory with waves up to a meter high for Miyakojima and the Yaeyama Islands in Okinawa Prefecture. A tsunami threat was also issued by the Pacific Tsunami Warning Center. A tsunami with heights of 0.41 m (1.3 ft) was observed.

=== Aftershocks ===
Time (UTC)	Magnitude (M_{w})	MMI	Source
2022-09-17 13:41	6.5	VII	
2022-09-17 15:35	5.1	VI	
2022-09-17 15:45	5.5	VII	
2022-09-18 05:19	5.6	VII	
2022-09-18 06:32	5.2	II	
2022-09-18 06:44	6.9	IX	
2022-09-18 06:57	5.1	IV	
2022-09-18 08:46	5.2	II	
2022-09-18 09:39	5.5	VII	

== Impact ==
=== September 17 ===
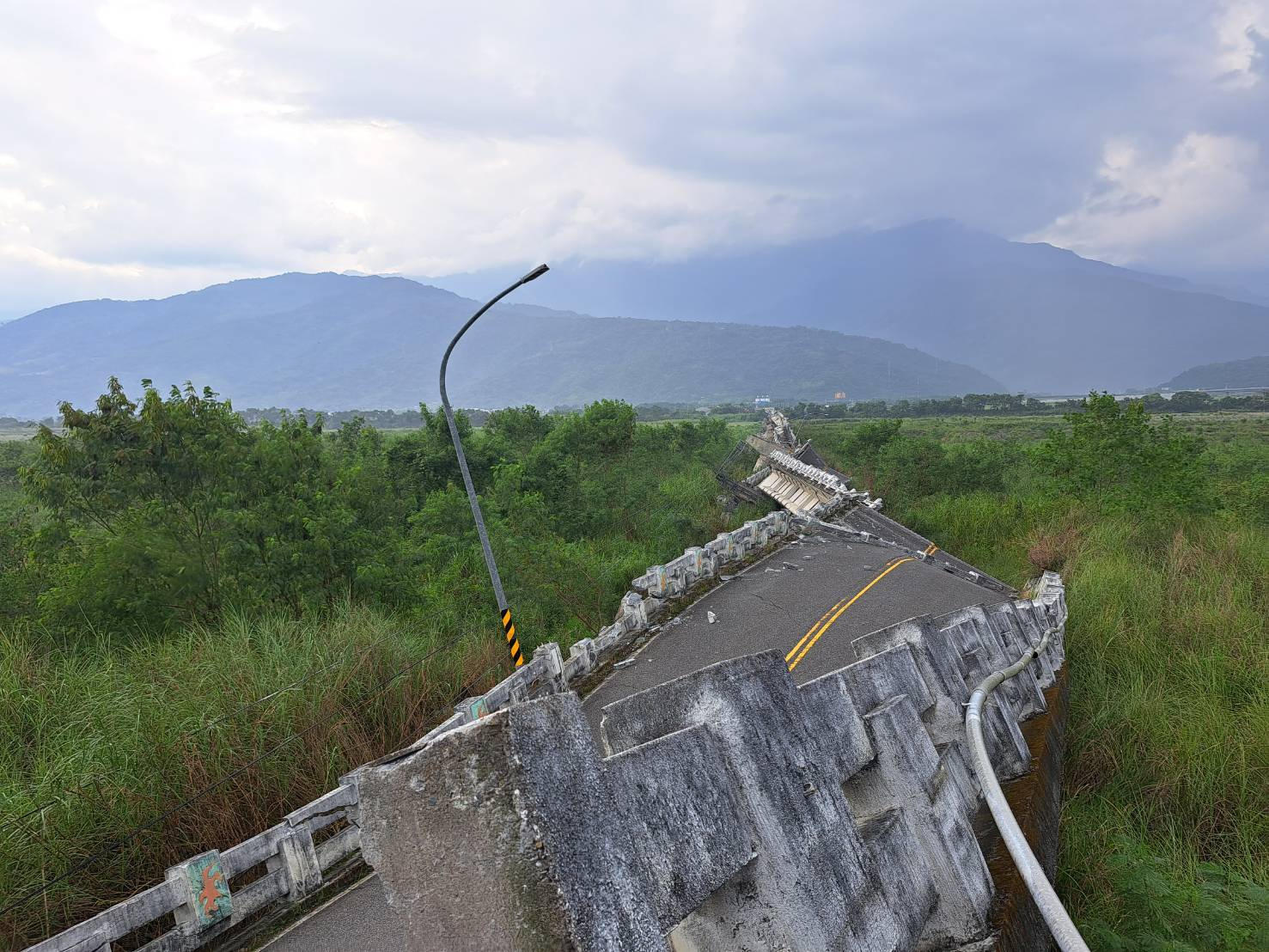
A collapsed highway

The Kaohsiung Metro system was temporarily suspended due to the shaking, and objects fell from shelves in Taitung City, where an old house collapsed. In Luye, part of the Gaoliao Bridge had been severely damaged. A shopping mall in Kaohsiung City suffered cracks in floors and ceilings. In Fuli, the wall of a house collapsed. The Wan'an Brick Factory, a historical monument in Chishang, collapsed. Eight people suffered minor injuries, and a man in Minxiong had to be treated for injuries after suffering a heart attack during the earthquake.

=== September 18 ===
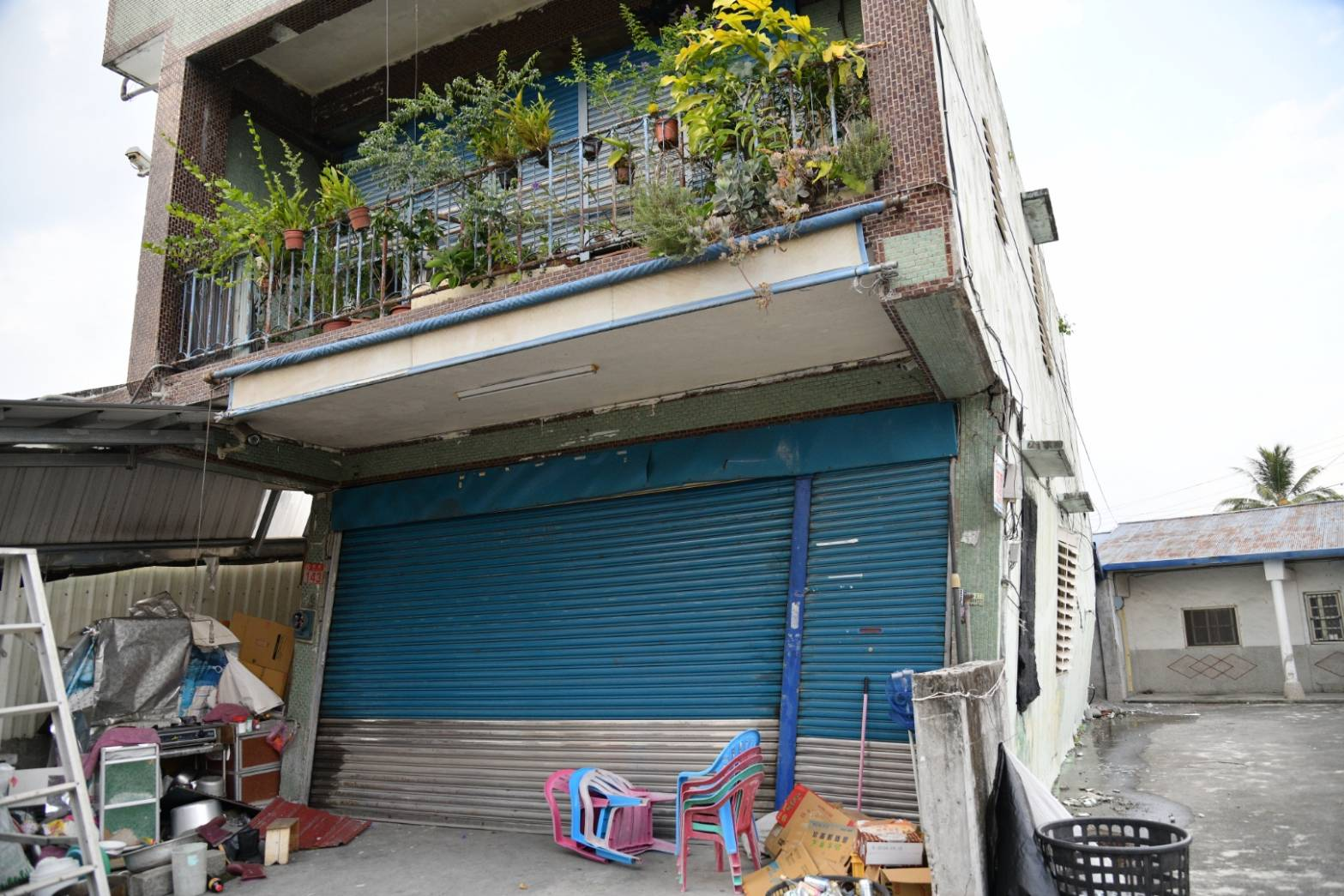
Damaged house

Along Zhongshan Road in Yuli, Hualien, a three-storey building housing a 7-Eleven store collapsed, injuring four people, who were all rescued. Part of the Dongli railway station was damaged and a train was derailed, and all 20 passengers were evacuated. In Yuli, Hualien County, part of a highway collapsed, injuring three people. Several other bridges were also damaged. In Taoyuan, a sports center collapsed, injuring two people. In Yuli, a cement factory collapsed, killing a 69-year old worker and injuring several others. In total, there were 171 reported injuries, most of them in Hualien and Taitung Counties.

In Yuli, 7,073 homes did not have power while blackouts were reported in Taipei, New Taipei, Tainan and Kaohsiung. According to the Ministry of Education, the earthquake damaged 594 schools, including 115 in Kaohsiung 90 in Taipei. The total incurred loss is at an estimated NT$4.61 million (US$147,310).

== Response ==
In a speech made shortly after the second earthquake, President Tsai Ing-wen warned of large aftershocks and called for citizens to remain vigilant. The Central Emergency Operation Center was placed on its highest alert level in response to aftershocks. The Atomic Energy Council said that nuclear plants across the country were unaffected and in usual operation. About 400 tourists were rescued after being stranded on Chike Mountain due to landslides. The local government ordered the closure of schools in Yuli, Fuli and Zhuoxi townships. School and work were suspended in Guanshan, Luye, Chihshang, Haiduan and Yanping townships. Schools and workplaces had to be close after noon of 18 September in the villages of Wulu, Lidao, Xinwu, and Haiduan. In Changbin township, work could resume but schools were suspended.

== See also ==
- List of earthquakes in 2022
- List of earthquakes in Taiwan
