= Chishang =

Chishang (Chinese: 池上) and may refer to the following locations in China or Taiwan:

- Chishang, Zibo (池上镇), in Boshan District, Zibo, Shandong
- Chishang, Taitung (池上鄉), township in Taitung County, Taiwan
  - Chishang Station (池上車站), railroad station in Chishang Township, on the Hualien–Taitung Line
