= James Huang =

James Huang may refer to:

- James Huang (actor) (born 1977), American actor
- James C. F. Huang (born 1958), Taiwanese diplomat
- C.-T. James Huang (born 1948), Taiwanese linguist
