= Wu Tao Chishang Lunch Box Cultural History Museum =

Museum in Chishang, Taitung County, Taiwan

- 悟饕池上飯包文化故事館
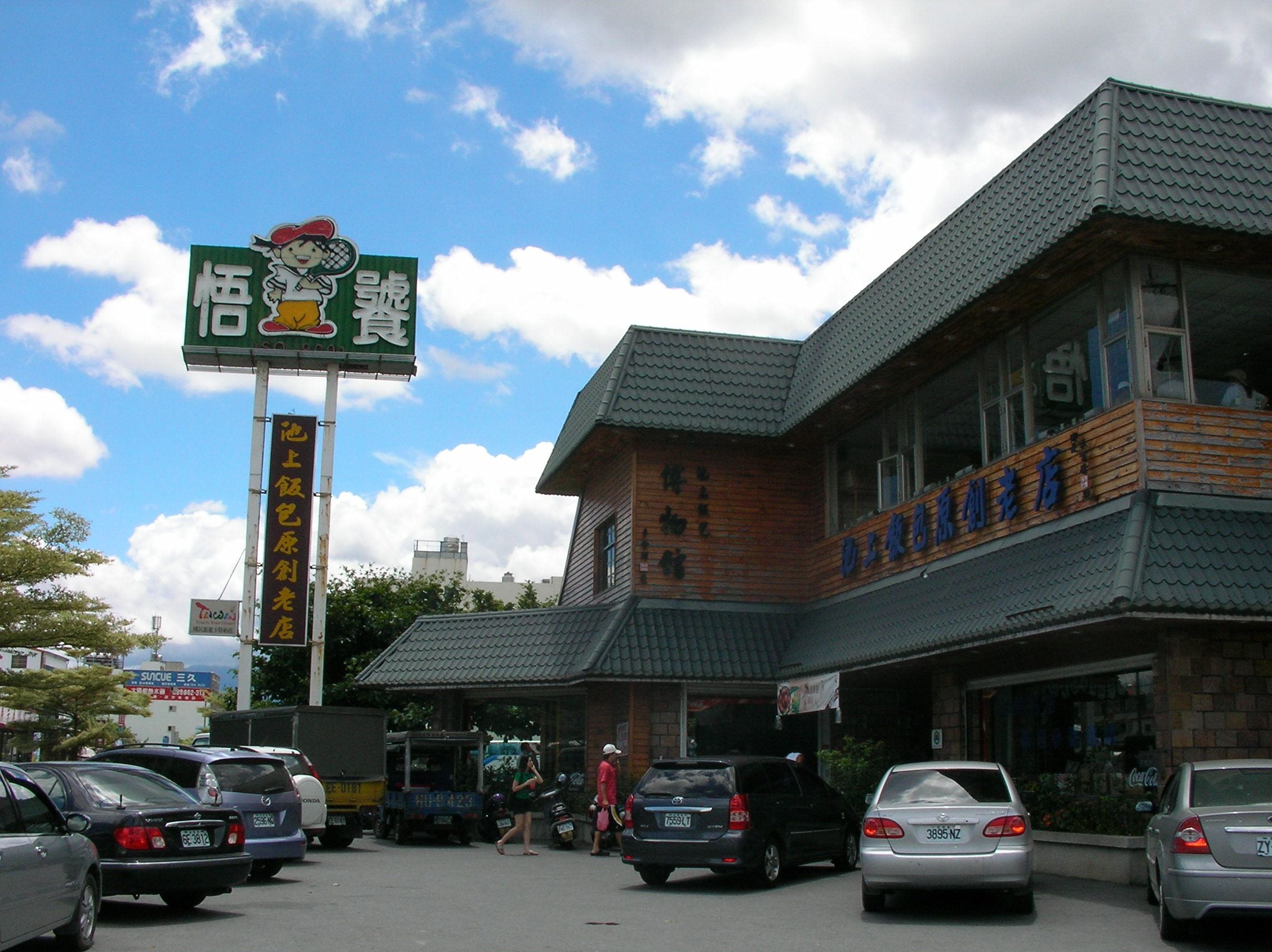
- Established: 2002
- Location: Chishang, Taitung County, Taiwan
- Coordinates: 23°07′27″N 121°13′15″E
- Type: museum
- Website: www.wu-tau.com/gallery

The Wu Tao Chishang Lunch Box Cultural History Museum (traditional Chinese: 悟饕池上飯包文化故事館; simplified Chinese: 悟饕池上饭包文化故事馆; pinyin: Wù Tāo Chíshàng Fànbāo Wénhuà Gùshìguǎn) is a museum about lunch boxes in Chishang Township, Taitung County, Taiwan. The museum also serves as a restaurant.

== History ==
The museum was opened in 2002 by Chishang Township Office and Chishang lunchbox vendors.

== Architecture ==
At the front of the building lies two vintage rolling stocks offer the nostalgic environment for a time when travelers would buy a lunch box to take with them on their train journey. On the second floor lies the museum which is devoted to the local rice culture.

== Transportation ==
The museum is accessible within walking distance southeast from Chishang Station of Taiwan Railway.

== See also ==
- List of museums in Taiwan
