= Dapo Pond =

Pond in Chishang, Taitung County, Taiwan

- 大坡池 (Chinese)
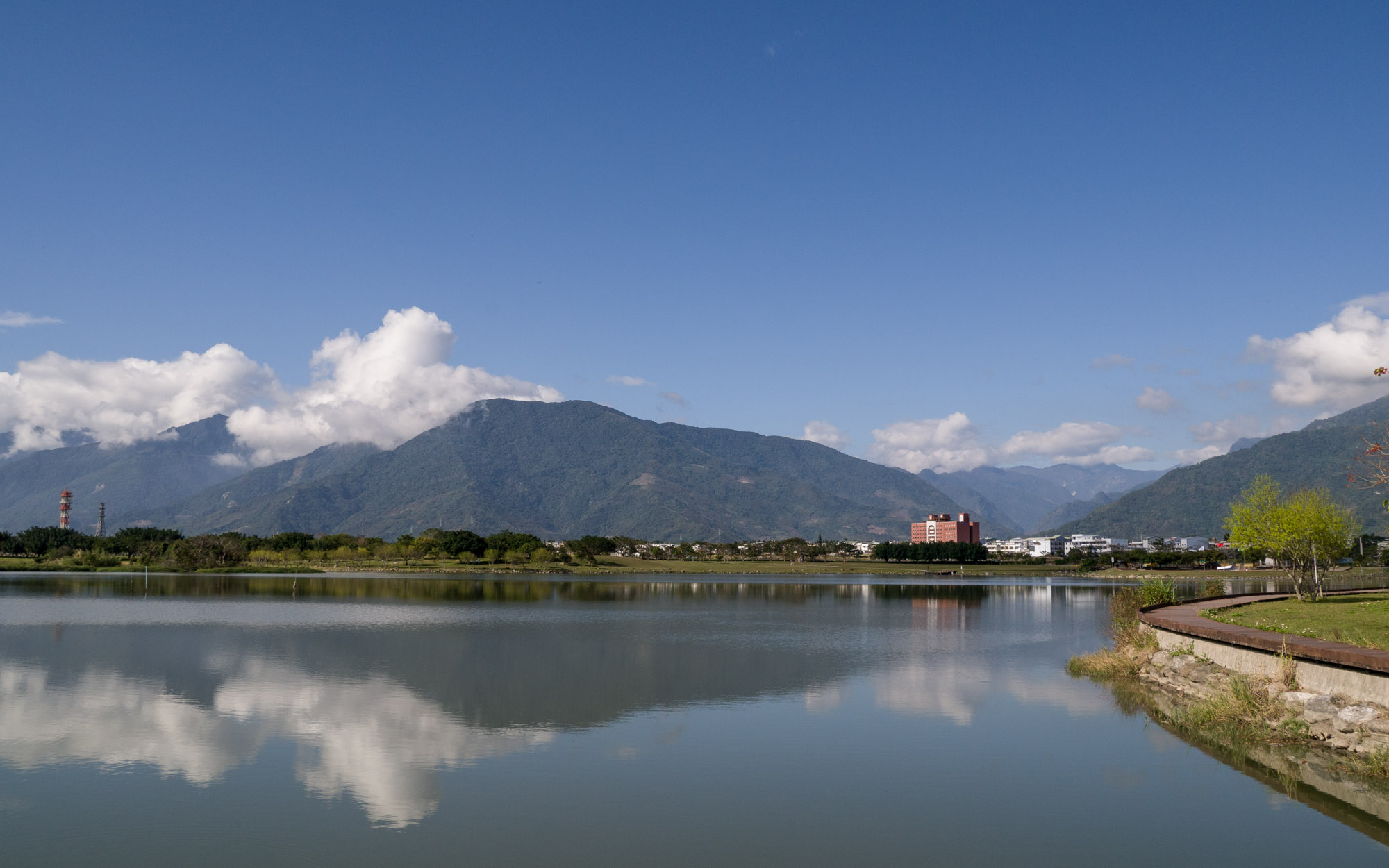

- Location within Taitung County
- Location: Chihshang, Taitung County, Taiwan
- Coordinates: 23°07′06.8″N 121°13′30.3″E
- Type: Pond
- Primary inflows: Xinwulyu River
- Primary outflows: Xiuguluan River
- Surface area: 55 hectares (140 acres)

The Dapo Pond (Chinese: 大坡池; pinyin: Dàpō Chí) is a pond in Chihshang Township, Taitung County, Taiwan.

== History ==
The pond was originally called Dabi. In early years, the fish and shrimp found in Chihshang came from Dapo area. During the Japanese rule of Taiwan, the pond had a surface area of 55 hectares and there were abundant fish and shrimp inside the water. Lotuses and water chestnuts also grew in the pond. After the handover of Taiwan from Japan to the Republic of China in 1945, the pond became one of the ten scenic sights of Taitung County under the title The Fishing Line of Chihshang. However, after the Large Dapo Drainage Ditch water conservation facility, natural silting and other factors, the surface area of the pond gradually shrinks.

== Geology ==
Dapo Pond is an inland freshwater swamp. It was formed as a result of fault activity in Chihshang. Its water comes from an underground stream located at the tip of the alluvial fan of Xinwulyu River. The pond river flows northward towards the lowlands, which then becomes the source of Xiuguluan River. Under the planning and revitalization efforts from Taitung County Government, the pond now has a surface area of around 20 hectares with another 20 hectares on its surrounding embankments and wetlands.

== Features ==
The area around the lake features several facilities, such as bike routes, footpath, pavilions, fishing area, bird watching area and garden.

== Activities ==
The area was the venue for the light show of the 2017 Taiwan International Balloon Festival.

== Transportation ==
The lake is accessible within walking distance south east of Chishang Station of Taiwan Railway.

== See also ==
- Geography of Taiwan
- List of lakes of Taiwan
