= Dongli Story House =

Factory in Fuli, Hualien County, Taiwan

Dongli Story House 御皇米百年文化故事館
- Built: 1899 (original building); 1950s (current building)
- Location: Fuli, Hualien County, Taiwan
- Coordinates: 23°16′03.3″N 121°18′09.2″E
- Industry: food
- Products: rice

The Dongli Story House (traditional Chinese: 禦皇米百年文化故事館; simplified Chinese: 御皇米百年文化故事館; pinyin: Yùhuángmǐ Bǎinián Wénhuà Gùshìguǎn) is a rice mill in Fuli Township, Hualien County, Taiwan.

== History ==
The building is a rice mill which was originally established in 1899 named Dongli Rice Factory. In the 1950s, the factory moved to its current bigger location due to the increase in rice production. In the 1970s, the factory began to produce organic rice due to the trend at that time. Later on, the Dongli Story House was established at the premise to preserve the historical artifacts of rice cultivation from the earlier times.

== Transportation ==
The factory is accessible within walking distance south of Dongli Station of Taiwan Railway.

== See also ==
- Taiwanese cuisine
