= Fuli railway station =

Railway station in Hualien, Taiwan

Fuli Station 富里車站
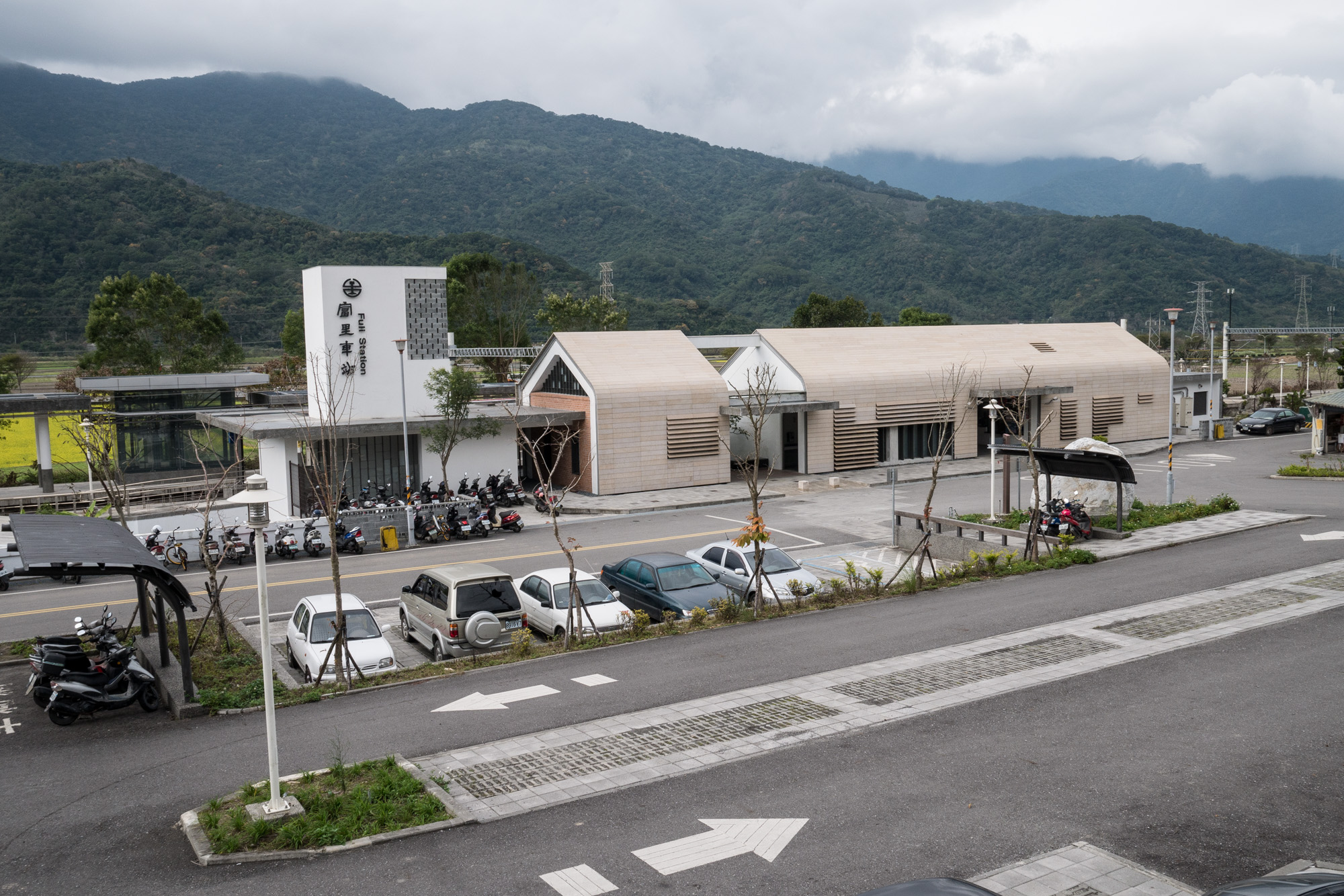

Chinese name
- Traditional Chinese: 富里車站
Transcriptions
Standard Mandarin
- Hanyu Pinyin: Fùlǐ Chēzhàn
- Bopomofo: ㄈㄨˋ ㄌㄧˇ ㄔㄜ ㄓㄢˋ

General information
- Location: Fuli, Hualien; Taiwan
- Coordinates: 23°10′44.9″N 121°14′55.1″E
- System: Taiwan Railway railway station
- Line: Taitung line
- Distance: 101.9 km to Hualien
- Platforms: 1 island platform 1 side platform

Construction
- Structure type: At-grade

Other information
- Station code: 018

History
- Opened: 20 January 1926

Passengers
- 2017: 72,078 per year
- Rank: 159

Services
Preceding station	Taiwan Railway	Following station
Dongzhu towards Badu	Eastern Trunk line	Chishang towards Taitung
Location

Fuli railway station (Chinese: 富里車站; pinyin: Fùlǐ Chēzhàn) is a railway station located in Fuli Township, Hualien County, Taiwan. It is located on the Taitung line and is operated by Taiwan Railway.
