= Sanmin railway station =

Railway station located in Hualien, Taiwan

Sanmin Station 三民車站
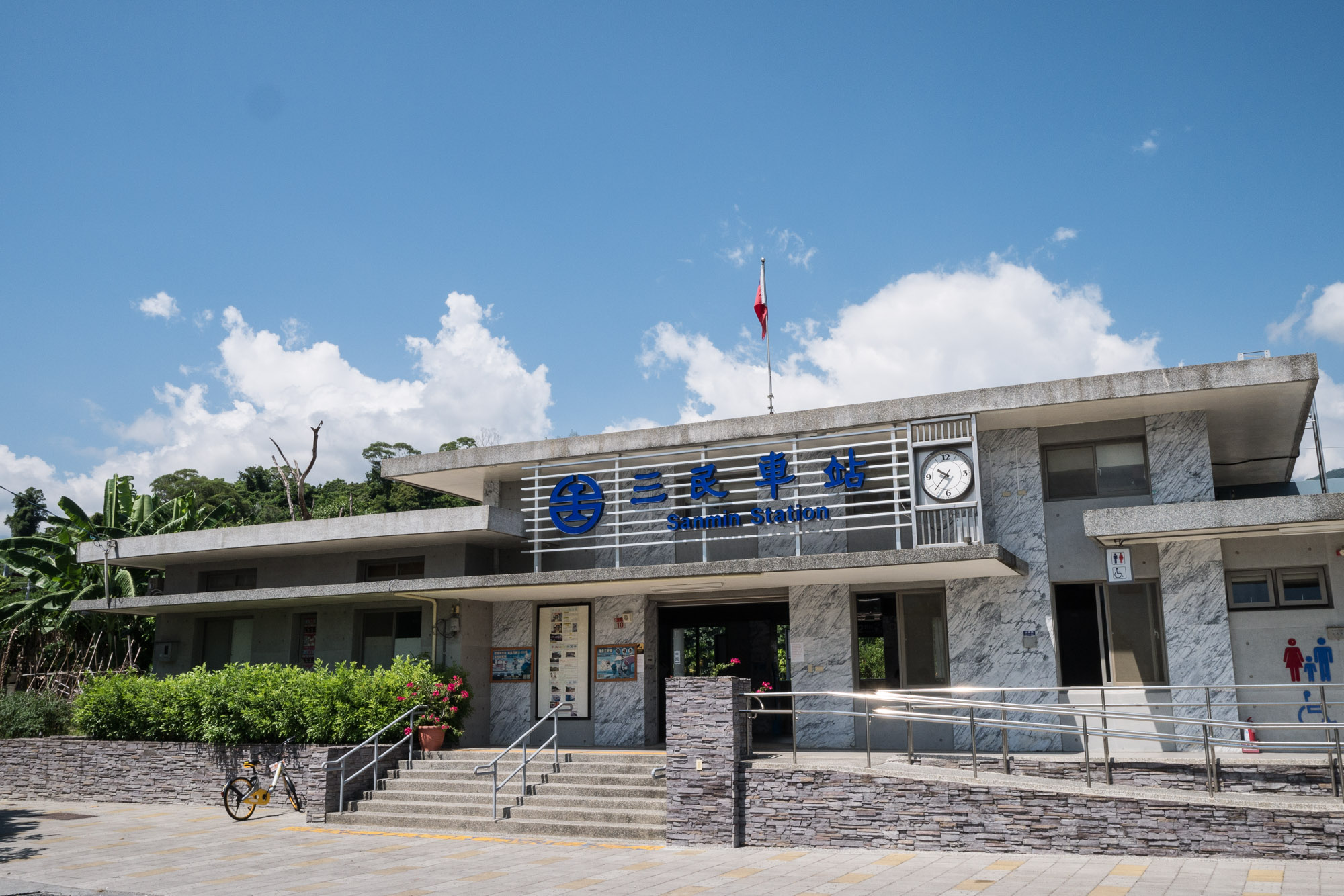
- Station entrance

Chinese name
- Traditional Chinese: 三民車站
Transcriptions
Standard Mandarin
- Hanyu Pinyin: Sānmín Chēzhàn
- Bopomofo: ㄙㄢ ㄇㄧㄣˊ ㄔㄜ ㄓㄢˋ

General information
- Location: Yuli, Hualien; Taiwan
- Coordinates: 23°25′28.3″N 121°20′43.3″E
- System: Taiwan Railway railway station
- Line: Taitung line
- Distance: 72.1 km to Hualien
- Platforms: 1 island platform 1 side platform

Construction
- Structure type: At-grade

Other information
- Station code: 027

History
- Opened: 1 November 1917

Passengers
- 2017: 2,662 per year
- Rank: 222

Services
Preceding station	Taiwan Railway	Following station
Ruisui towards Badu	Eastern Trunk line	Yuli towards Taitung
Location

Sanmin railway station (Chinese: 三民車站; pinyin: Sānmín Chēzhàn) is a railway station located in Yuli Township, Hualien County, Taiwan. It is located on the Taitung line and is operated by Taiwan Railway.
