= Dongzhu railway station =

Railway station located in Hualien, Taiwan

Dongzhu Station 東竹車站
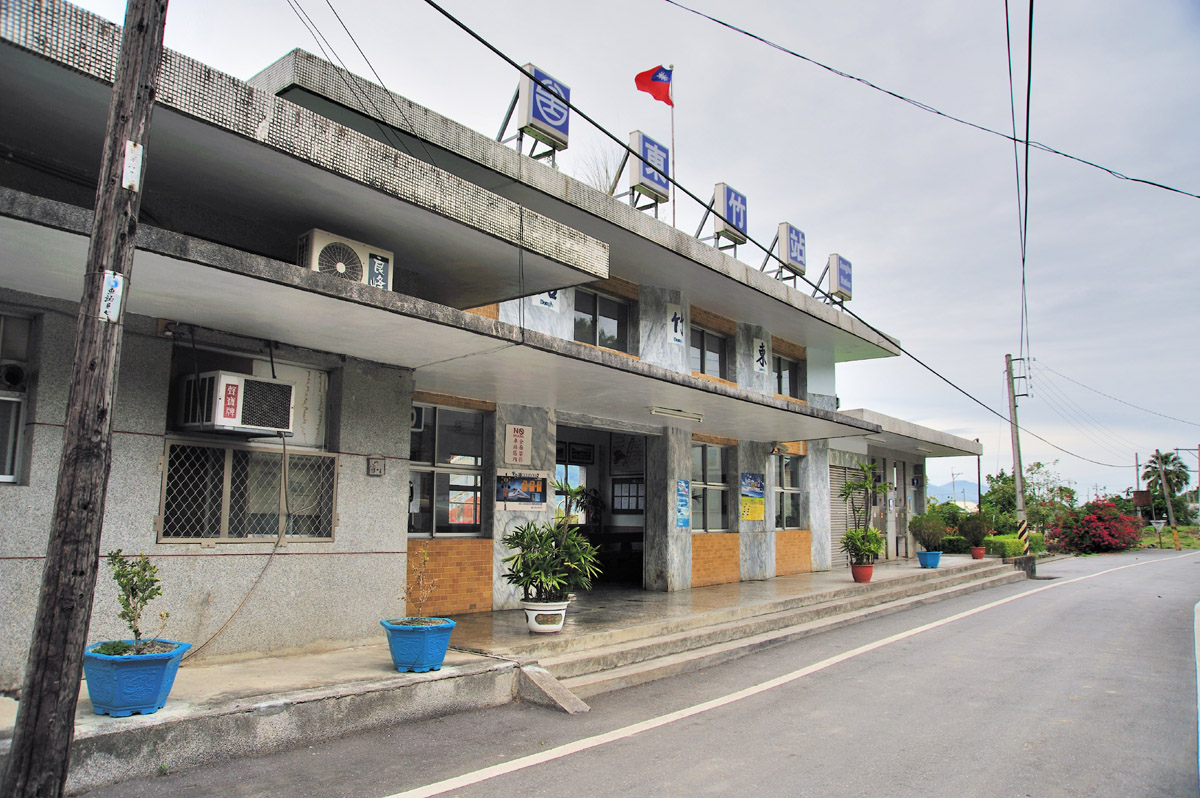

Chinese name
- Traditional Chinese: 東竹車站
Transcriptions
Standard Mandarin
- Hanyu Pinyin: Dōngzhú Chēzhàn
- Bopomofo: ㄉㄨㄥ ㄓㄨˊ ㄔㄜ ㄓㄢˋ

General information
- Location: Fuli, Hualien; Taiwan
- Coordinates: 23°13′33.7″N 121°16′42.3″E
- System: Taiwan Railway railway station
- Line: Taitung line
- Distance: 95.7 km to Hualien
- Platforms: 1 island platform

Construction
- Structure type: At-grade

Other information
- Station code: 020

History
- Opened: 1 May 1924

Passengers
- 2017: 6,190 per year
- Rank: 214

Services
Preceding station	Taiwan Railway	Following station
Dongli towards Badu	Eastern Trunk line	Fuli towards Taitung
Location

Dongzhu railway station (Chinese: 東竹車站; pinyin: Dōngzhú Chēzhàn) is a railway station located in Fuli Township, Hualien County, Taiwan. It is located on the Taitung line and is operated by the Taiwan Railway.
