= Yuli railway station =

Railway station located in Hualien, Taiwan

Yuli Station 玉里車站
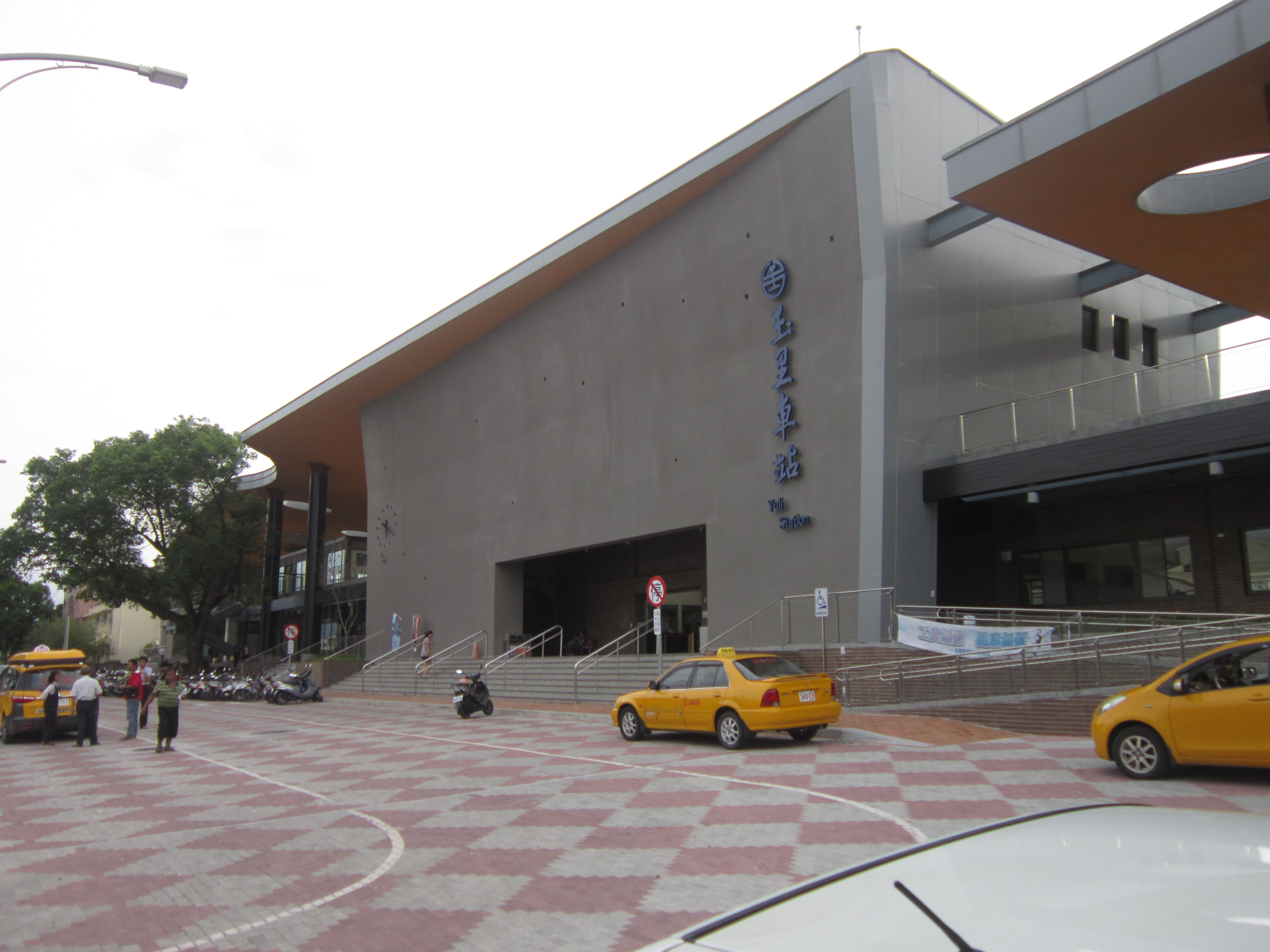
- Station entrance

Chinese name
- Traditional Chinese: 玉里車站
Transcriptions
Standard Mandarin
- Hanyu Pinyin: Yùlǐ Chēzhàn
- Bopomofo: ㄩˋ ㄌㄧˇ ㄔㄜ ㄓㄢˋ

General information
- Location: Yuli, Hualien County, Taiwan
- Coordinates: 23°19′53.7″N 121°18′42.3″E
- System: TR railway station
- Line: Taitung line
- Distance: 83.1 km to Hualien
- Platforms: 1 island platform 1 side platform

Construction
- Structure type: At-grade

Other information
- Station code: 025

History
- Opened: 22 September 1917

Passengers
- 2017: 491,530 per year
- Rank: 80

Services
Preceding station	Taiwan Railway	Following station
Sanmin towards Badu	Eastern Trunk line	Dongli towards Taitung
Location

Yuli railway station (Chinese: 玉里車站; pinyin: Yùlǐ Chēzhàn) is a railway station located in Yuli Township, Hualien County, Taiwan. It is located on the Taitung line and is operated by Taiwan Railway.
