= Rice Village Museum =

Museum in Chishang, Taitung County, Taiwan

- 稻米原鄉館
- Established: 1994
- Location: Chihshang, Taitung County, Taiwan
- Coordinates: 23°05′50.4″N 121°13′09.0″E
- Type: food museum
- Website: Official website (in Chinese)

The Rice Village Museum (traditional Chinese: 稻米原鄉館; simplified Chinese: 稻米原乡馆; pinyin: Dàomǐ Yuán Xiāngguǎn) is a food museum in Wan'an Village, Chihshang Township, Taitung County, Taiwan.

== History ==
The museum was established by Wan'an Community Development Association in 1994 by transforming an unused fertilizer warehouse to the Rice Village Museum.

== Activities ==
The museum regularly holds various activities such as guided tours of rice farming and travel as well as painting activities.

== See also ==
- List of museums in Taiwan
