= Dongli railway station =

Railway station located in Hualien, Taiwan

Dongli Station 東里車站
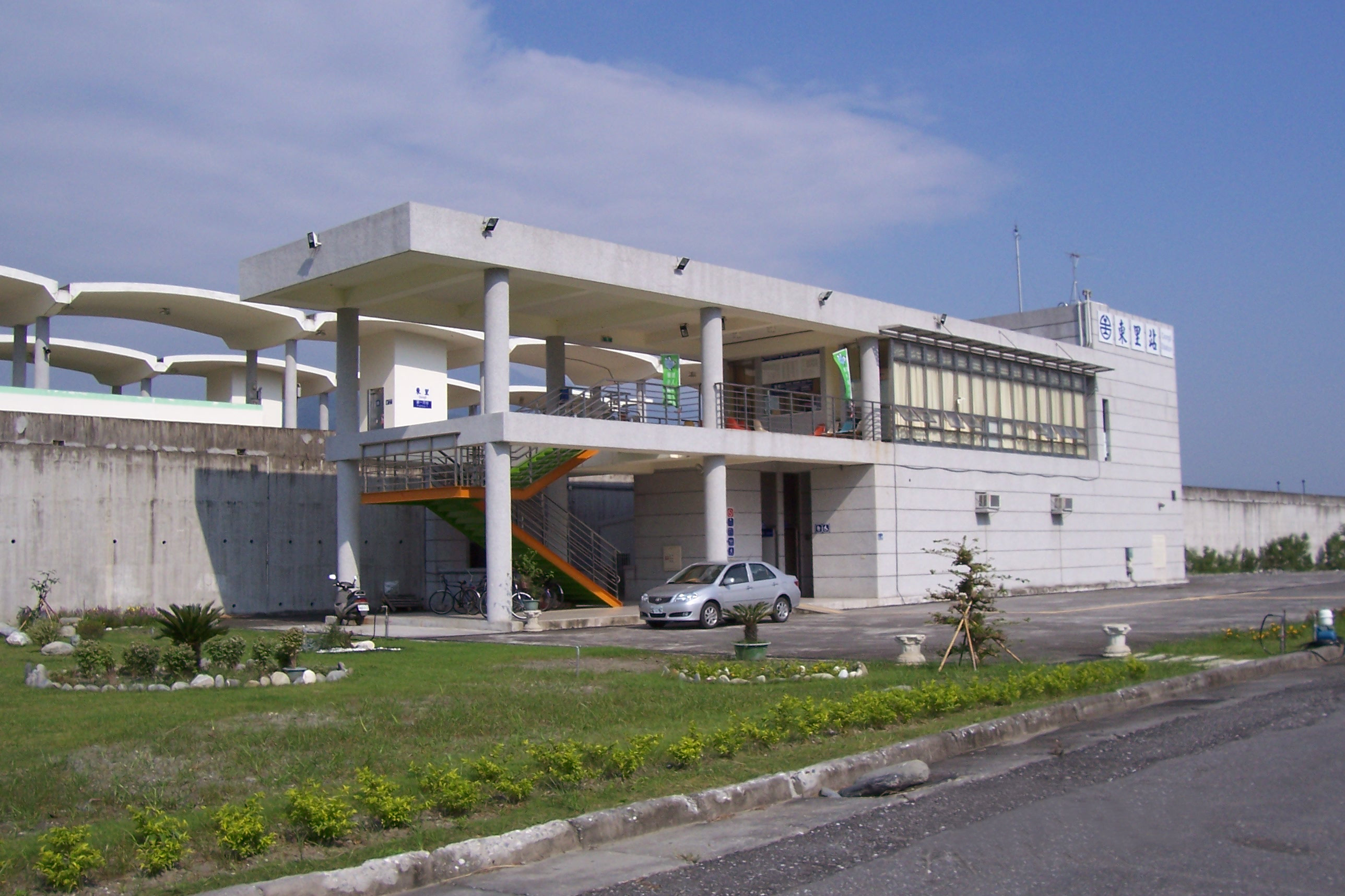

Chinese name
- Traditional Chinese: 東里車站
Transcriptions
Standard Mandarin
- Hanyu Pinyin: Dōnglǐ Chēzhàn
- Bopomofo: ㄉㄨㄥ ㄌㄧˇ ㄔㄜ ㄓㄢˋ

General information
- Location: Fuli, Hualien; Taiwan
- Coordinates: 23°16′20.8″N 121°18′14.7″E
- System: Taiwan Railway railway station
- Line: Taitung line
- Distance: 89.8 km to Hualien
- Platforms: 1 island platform 1 side platform

Construction
- Structure type: Elevated

Other information
- Station code: 022

History
- Opened: 1 May 1924

Passengers
- 2017: 7,033 per year
- Rank: 210

Services
Preceding station	Taiwan Railway	Following station
Yuli towards Badu	Eastern Trunk line	Dongzhu towards Taitung
Location

Dongli railway station (Chinese: 東里車站; pinyin: Dōnglǐ Chēzhàn) is a railway station located in Fuli Township, Hualien County, Taiwan. It is located on the Taitung line and is operated by Taiwan Railway.

== History ==
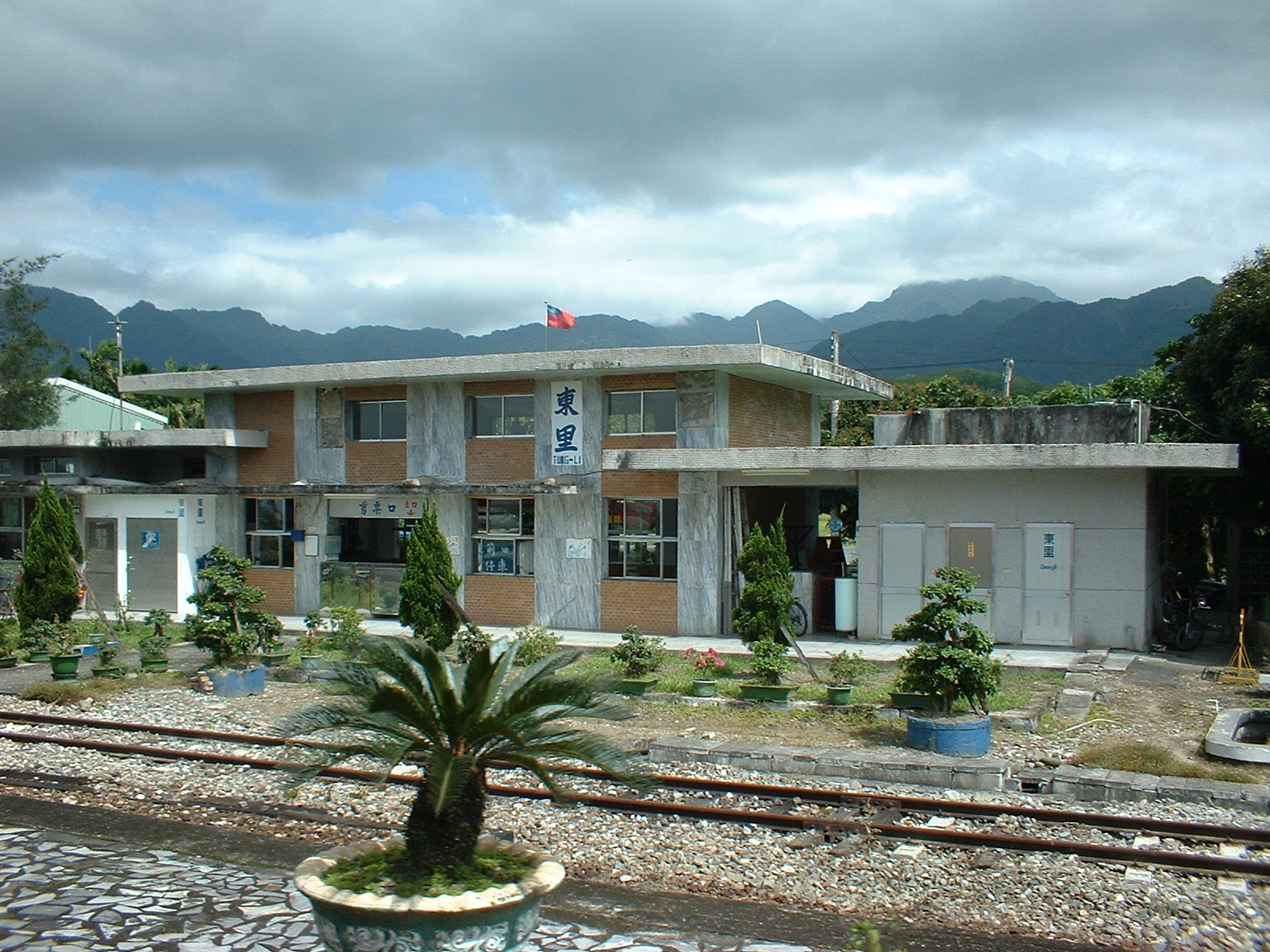
Old Dongli railway station

The station was originally constructed in the southeast of the current building, when the line was not yet rerouted. After the line was rerouted, the new building was constructed to be what is the current Dongli railway station, and the old station was named Old Dongli railway station (Chinese: 東里舊站). The old station now serves as the southern end of the 9.8-km long Yufu Bikeway (Chinese: 玉富自行車道), taking the place of the old section of the railway line before the rerouting works.

On 18 September 2022, six coaches of the Tze-chiang limited express which was stopping at the station were derailed by the 2022 Taitung earthquakes.

== Around the station ==
- Dongli Story House
