= Fuli, Hualien =

Fuli Township 富里鄉 Tomizato
- Rural township
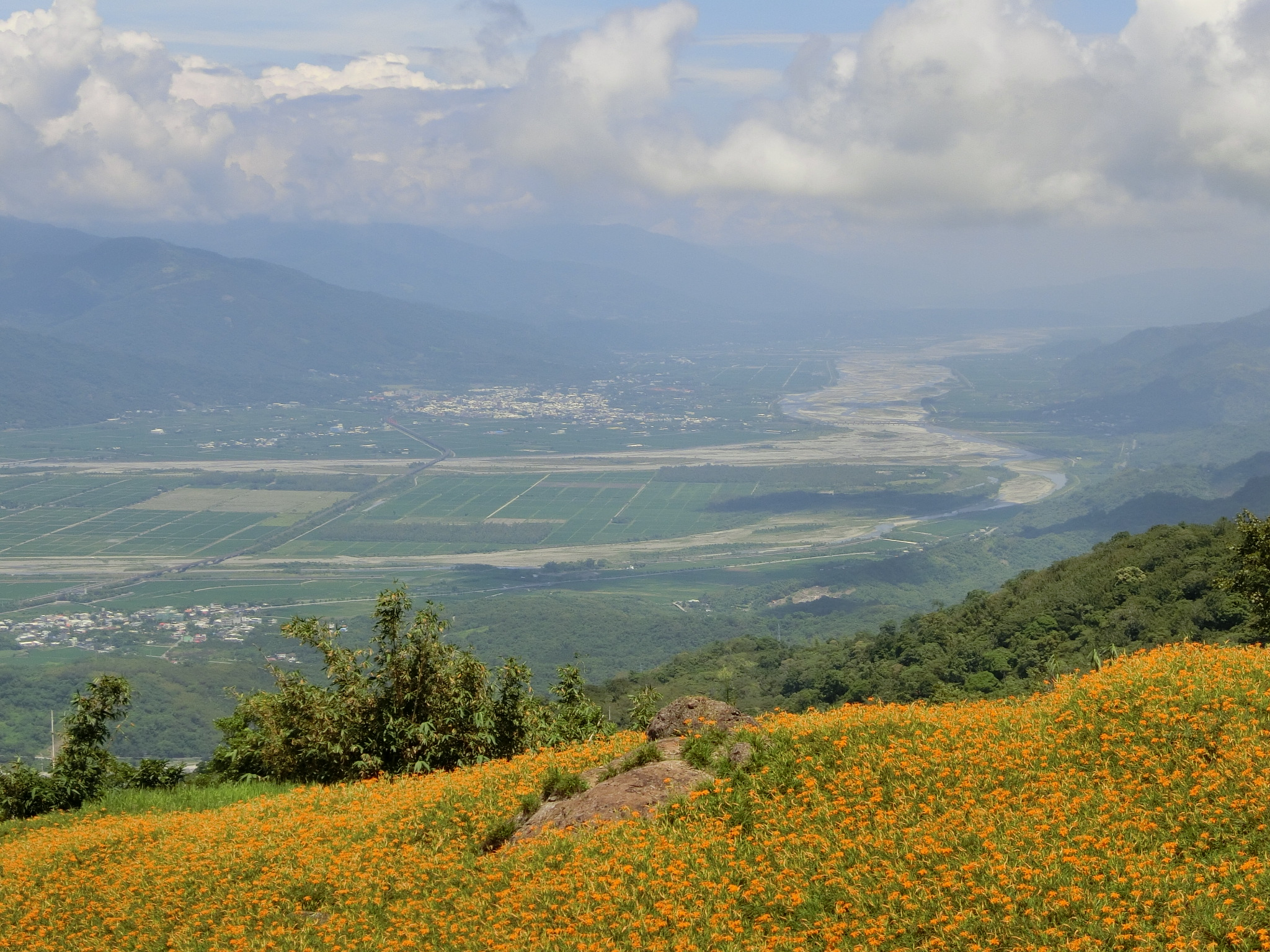
- View of Fuli Township in the foreground, in the background is Yuli Township

- Coordinates: 23°08′00″N 121°17′00″E
- Country: Taiwan
- Region: Eastern Taiwan

Government
  - Type: Rural Township

Area
  - Total: 176.3705 km^{2} (68.0970 sq mi)

Population (February 2023)
  - Total: 9,681
- Time zone: UTC+8 (CST)
- Post code: 983
- Subdivision: 13 Villages
- Website: www.fuli.gov.tw (in Chinese)

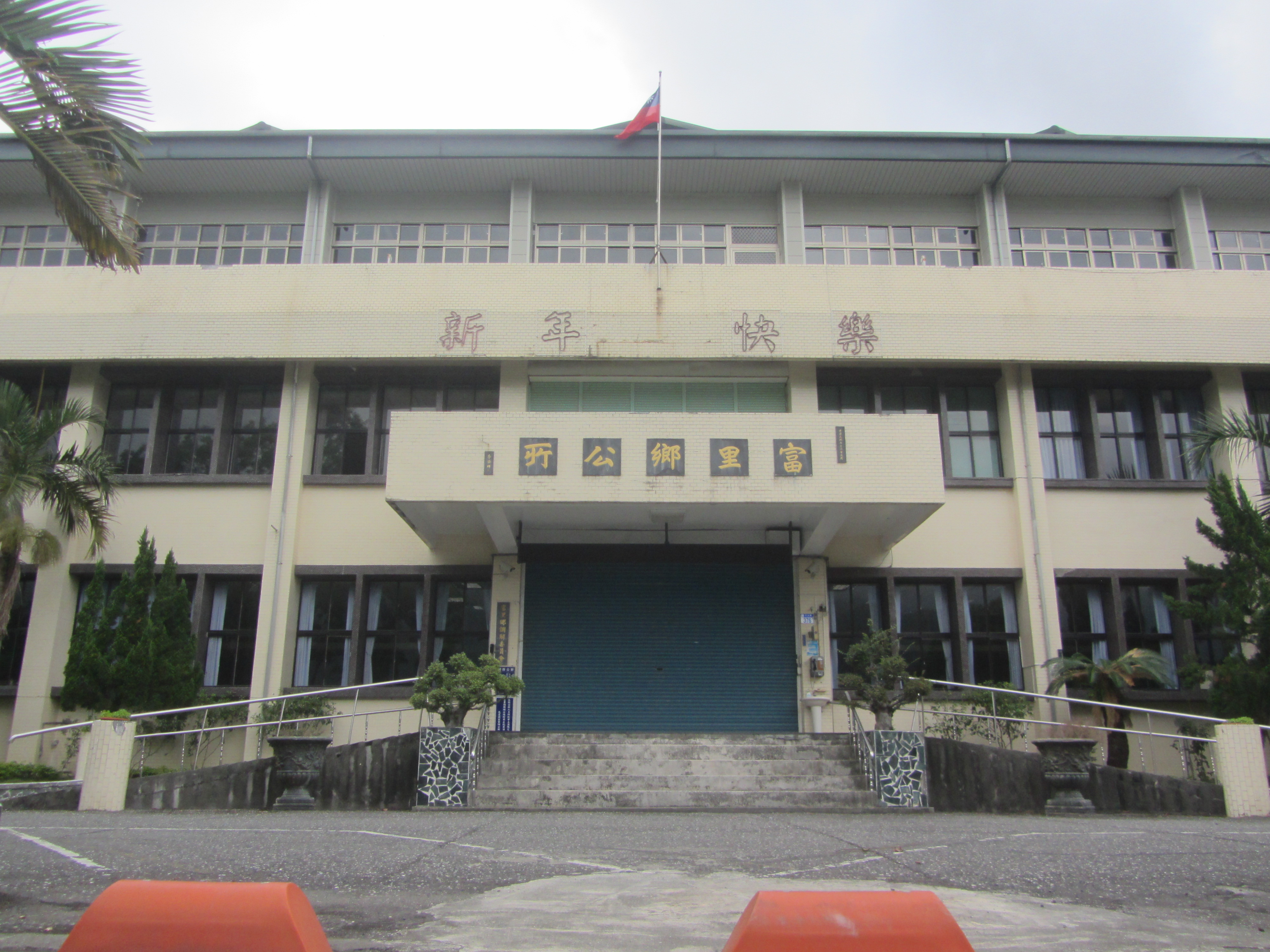
Fuli Township office

Fuli Township (Chinese: 富里鄉; pinyin: Fùlǐ Xiāng; Pe̍h-ōe-jī: Hù-lí-hiong) is a rural township located in southern Hualien County, Taiwan.

== Geography ==
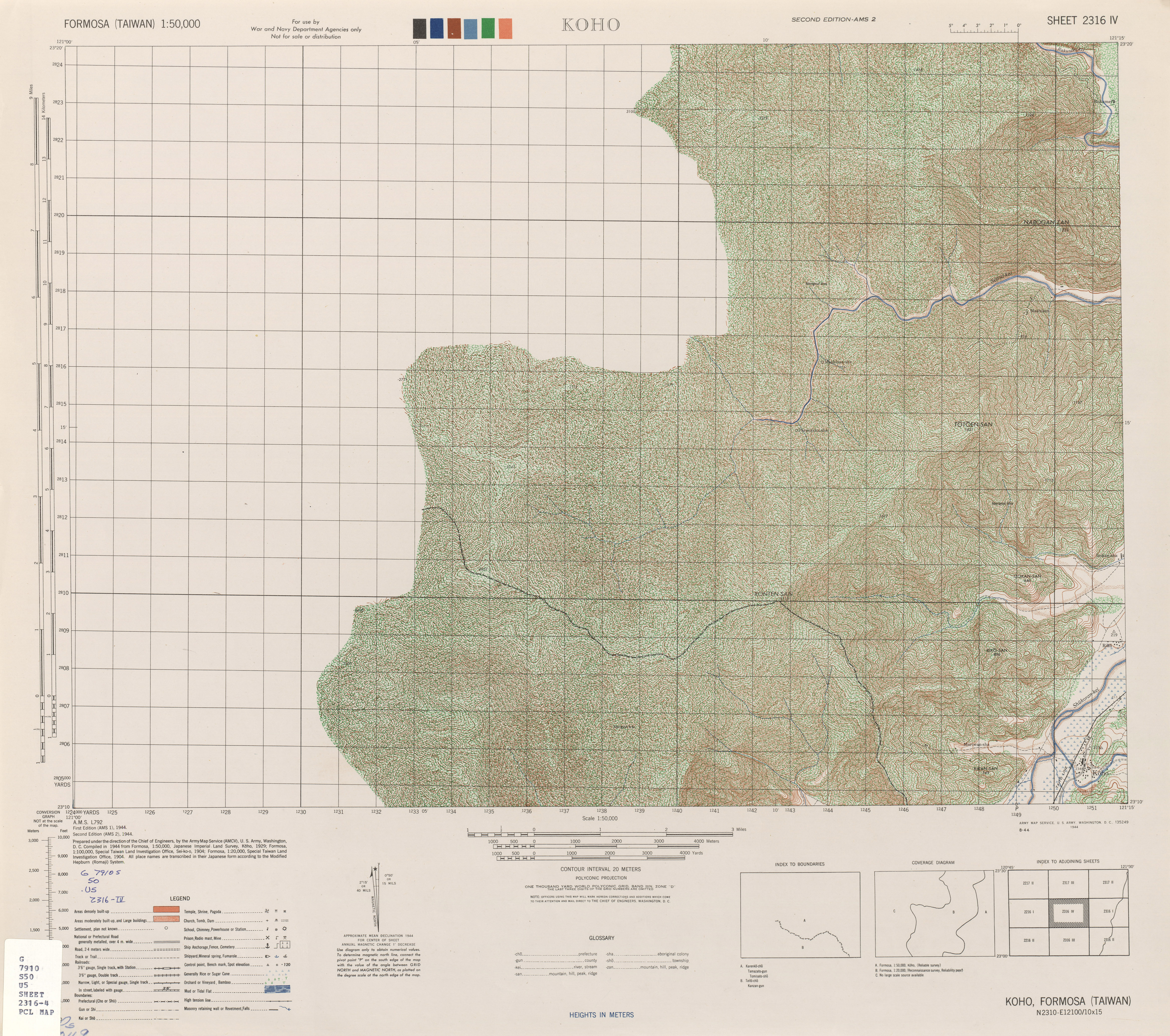
Map of Fuli (labeled as Kōho) and surrounding areas (1944)

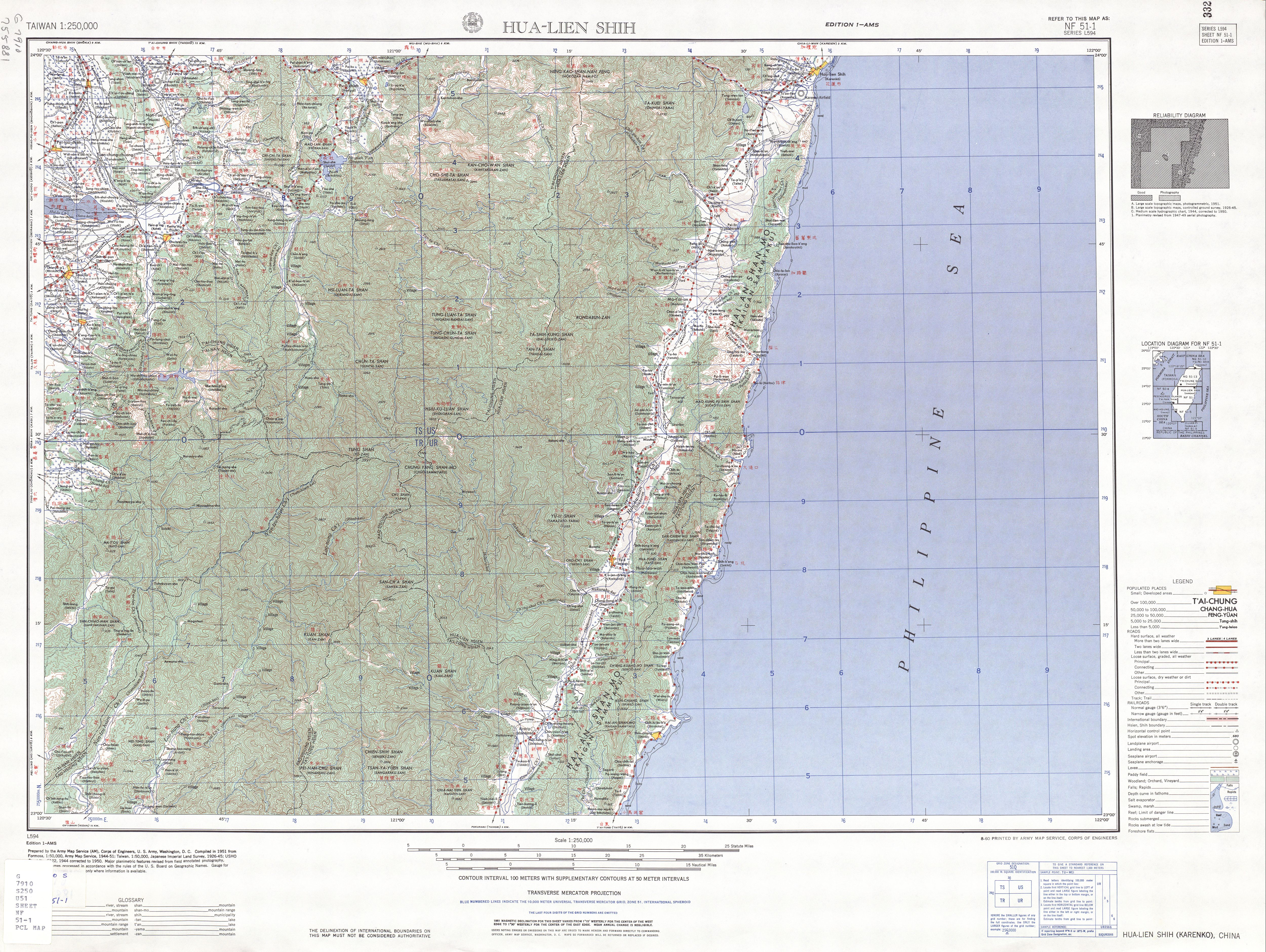
Map of the region including Fuli (labeled as Fu-li-hsiang (Furikyō) 富里鄉) (1951)

The township is located at the Huatung Valley. It has 9,681 inhabitants with 4,033 households around. The population is composed of Hakka, Hoklo, and Ami peoples.

== Administrative divisions ==
Fengnan, Fuli, Funan, Luoshan, Mingli, Shipai, Tungli, Wanning, Wujiang, Xinxing, Xuetian Yongfeng and Zhutian Village.

== Economy ==
Fuli Rice is a famous rice harvested in Taiwan that contributes to the economy and provides employment opportunities for residents.

== Tourist attractions ==
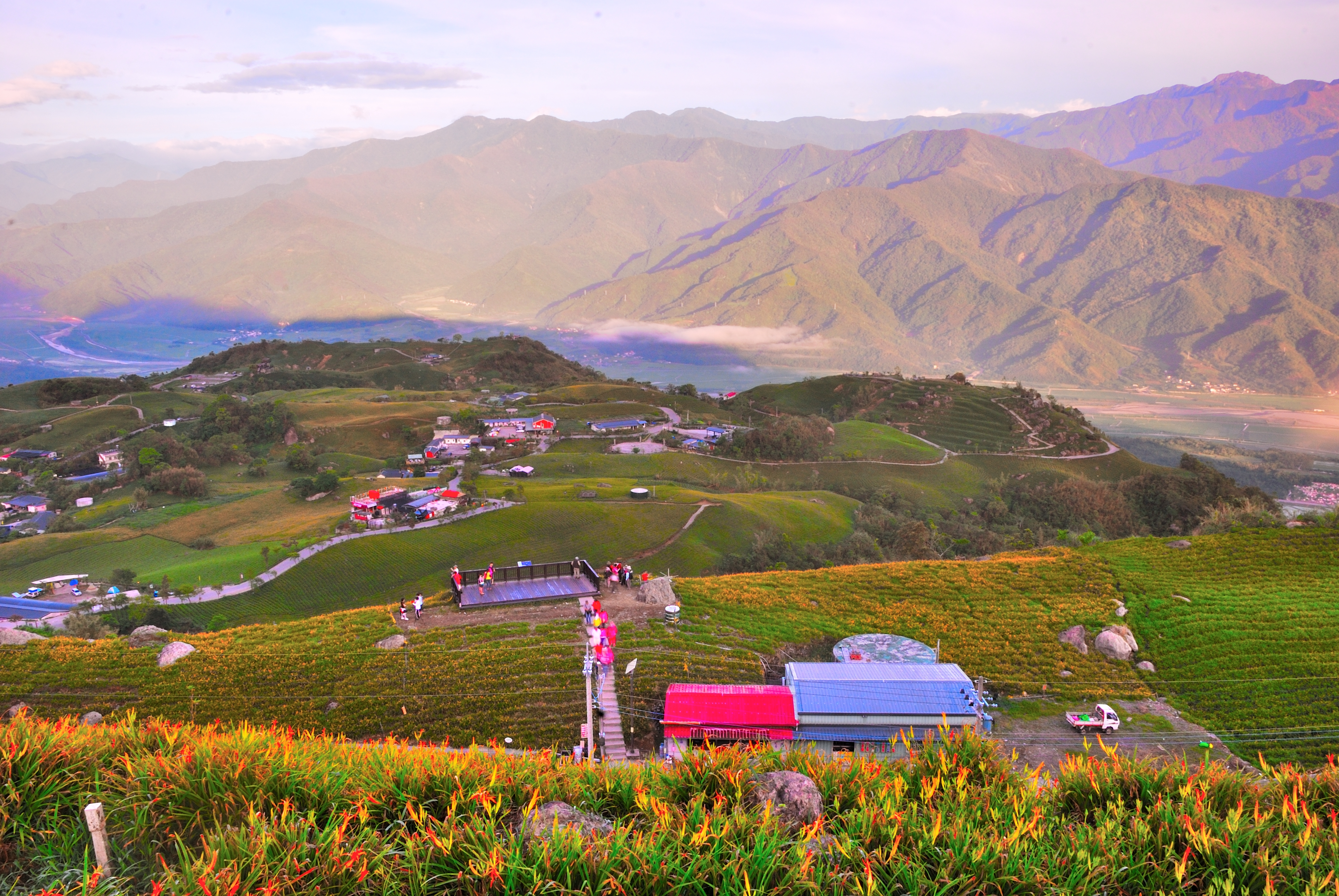
Sixty Stones Mountain

- Dongli Story House
- Xiuguluan River
- Fuli Hot spring
- Loshan Waterfall
- Luntian Recreation Area
- Luoshan Recreation Area
- Shihcuo Ditch
- Siou Tianhsiang
- Sixty Stones Mountain - Golden Needle Flower (Hemerocallis fulva) Recreation Area

== Transportation ==
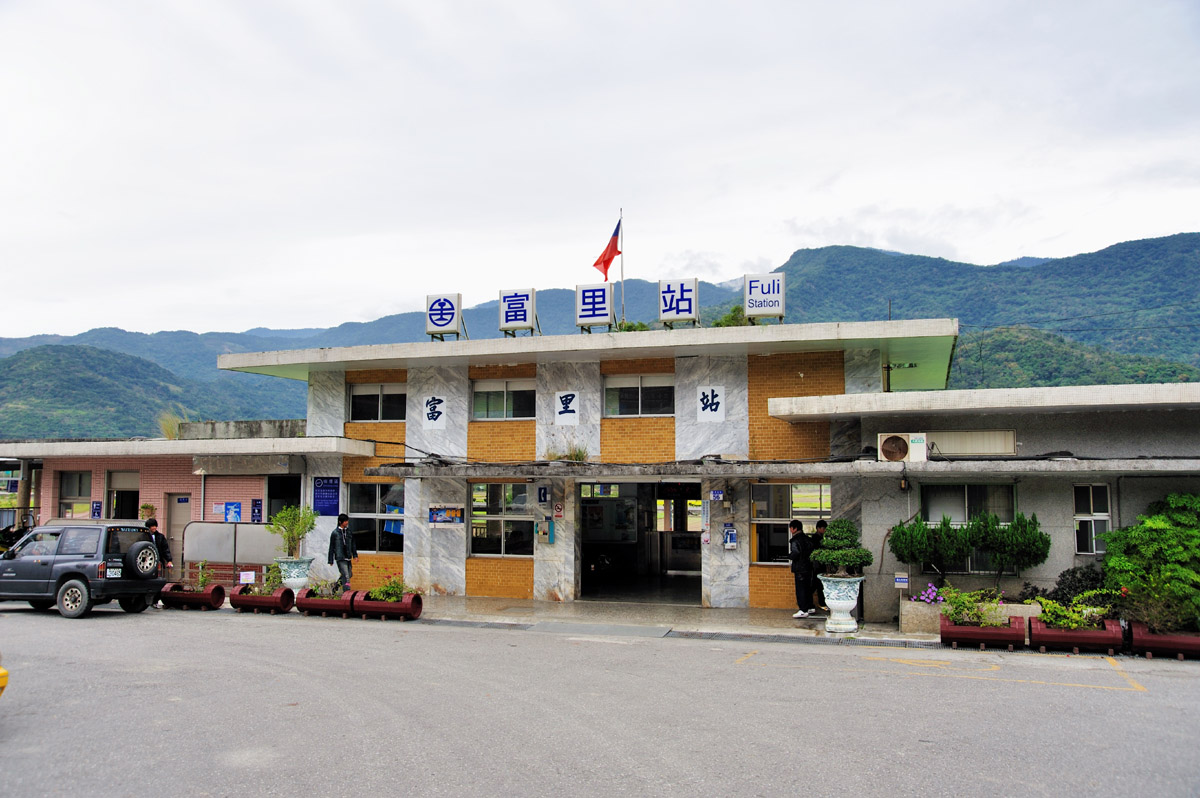
Fuli Rail Station

=== Rail ===
- Dongli Station
- Dongzhu Station
- Fuli Station

== Notable natives ==
- C.-T. James Huang, linguist
- Waa Wei, singer, songwriter, radio DJ, author, actress, artist
