= Chishang railway station =

Railway station located in Chishang, Taitung County, Taiwan

Chishang Station 池上車站
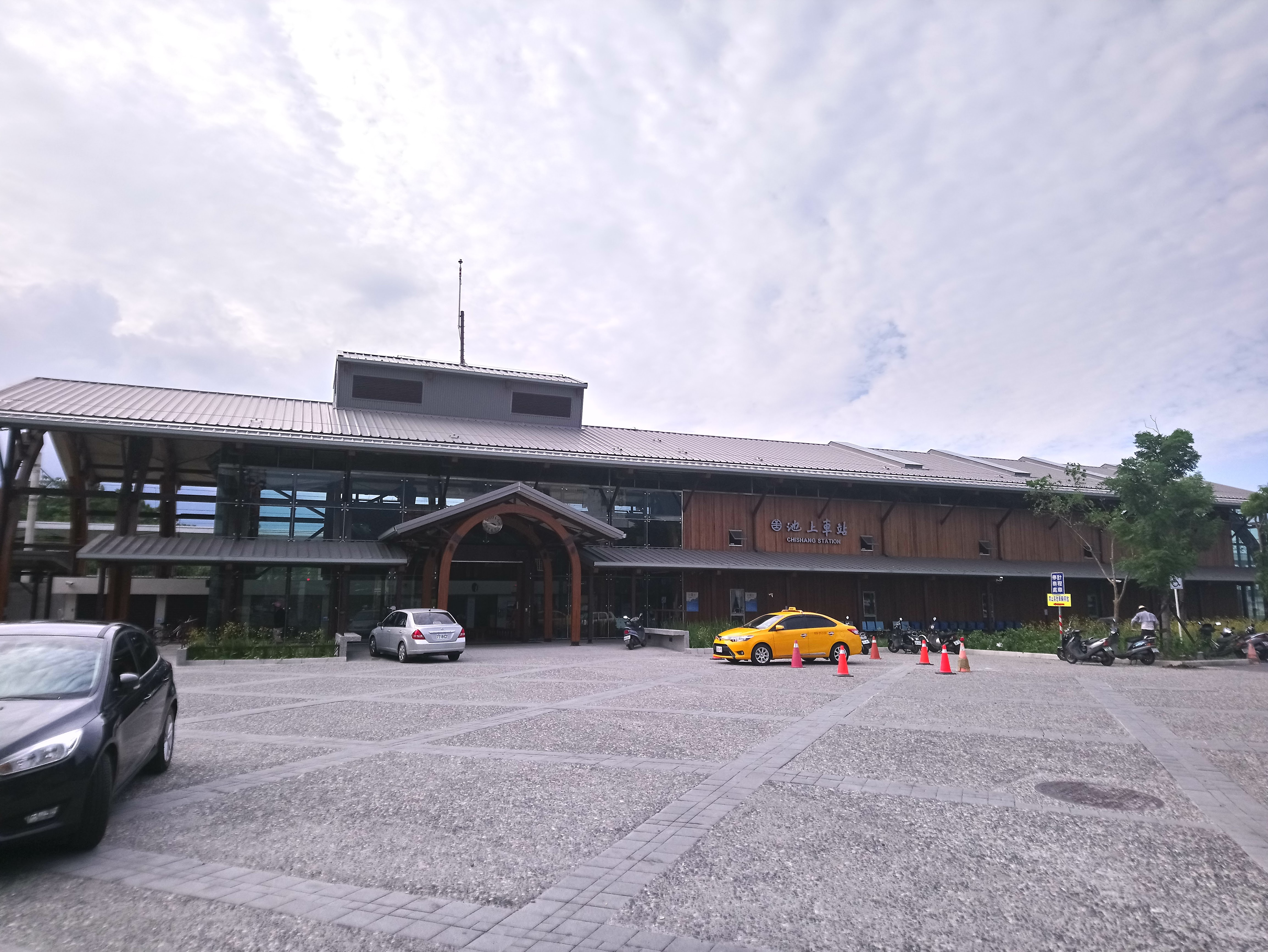

Chinese name
- Traditional Chinese: 池上車站
Transcriptions
Standard Mandarin
- Hanyu Pinyin: Chíshàng Chēzhàn
- Bopomofo: ㄔˊ ㄕㄤˋ ㄔㄜ ㄓㄢˋ

General information
- Location: Chishang, Taitung; Taiwan
- Coordinates: 23°07′34.0″N 121°13′10.1″E
- System: Taiwan Railway railway station
- Line: Taitung line
- Distance: 108.8 km to Hualien
- Platforms: 1 island platform

Construction
- Structure type: At-grade

Other information
- Station code: 015

History
- Opened: 1 September 1924

Passengers
- 2017: 192,023 per year
- Rank: 127

Services
Preceding station	Taiwan Railway	Following station
Fuli towards Badu	Eastern Trunk line	Haiduan towards Taitung
Location

Chishang railway station (Chinese: 池上車站; pinyin: Chíshàng Chēzhàn) is a railway station located in Chishang Township, Taitung County, Taiwan. It is located on the Taitung line and is operated by the Taiwan Railway.

== Around the station ==
- Dapo Pond
- Wu Tao Chishang Lunch Box Cultural History Museum
