= C.-T. James Huang =

Taiwanese linguist (born 1948)

- 黃正德
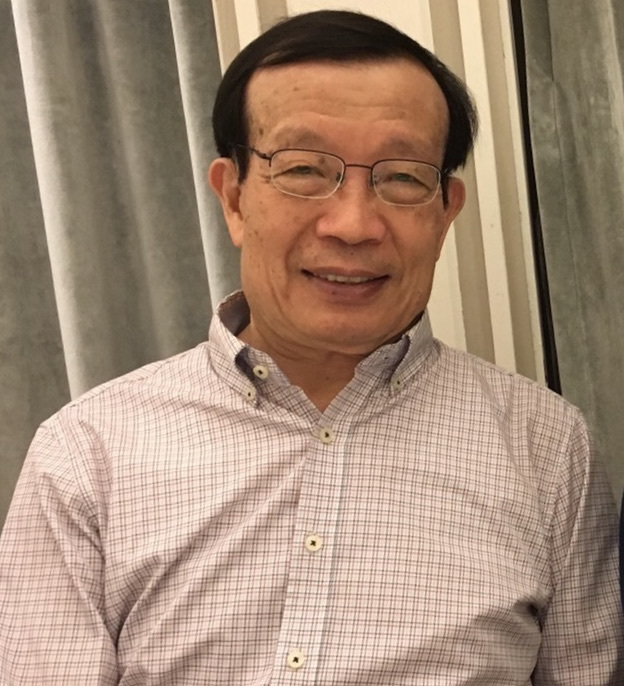
- Huang in 2017
- Born: 1948 (age 77–78); Fuli, Hualien, Taiwan
- Education: National Taiwan Normal University (BA, MA); Massachusetts Institute of Technology (PhD)
- Known for: Condition on Extraction Domain; Logical form
- Scientific career
- Fields: Linguistics
- Workplaces: Harvard University Past: Fu Jen Catholic University (1976–78); University of Hawaii (1982–83); National Taiwan Normal University (1983–85); National Tsing Hua University (1983–85); Cornell University (1985–91); UC-Irvine (1989–2002)
- Thesis: Logical relations in Chinese and the theory of grammar (1982)
- Doctoral advisors: Noam Chomsky; Ken Hale
- Website: ctjhuang.scholars.harvard.edu

C.T. James Huang (Chinese: 黃正德; born 1948) is a Taiwanese-American linguist. He is a professor emeritus of linguistics at Harvard University.

== Early life and education ==
Huang was born in the small township of Fuli, Hualien, in Taiwan. He graduated from National Taiwan Normal University with a B.A. in 1971 and an M.A. in 1974. He then completed doctoral studies in the United States on a Fulbright Fellowship, earning his Ph.D. in linguistics from the Massachusetts Institute of Technology (MIT) in 1982. He wrote his doctoral dissertation, "Logical relations in Chinese and the theory of grammar," under linguists Noam Chomsky and Kenneth L. Hale.

== Career ==
Huang was the recipient of a Guggenheim Fellowship in 1988. He received the Linguistic Society of Taiwan's Lifetime Achievement award in 2014 and was elected a Fellow of the Linguistic Society of America in 2015. In 2016, he was elected an Academician in the Convocation of the Academia Sinica's division of Humanities and Social Sciences. In 2019 he was elected a Member of Academia Europaea (The Academy of Europe).

Huang has published articles and books in both English and Mandarin Chinese within the generative grammar framework of linguistics, extensively on the structure of Mandarin Chinese grammar. His influence in the field is widely credited for "paving the way and leading the development of Chinese theoretical syntax"; "without his pioneering research [...] such a field would not exist in the rich way we presently know it". In 2009, Huang collaborated with Y.-H. Audrey Li and Yafei Li to co-author a Cambridge Syntax Guide spanning the work of the past 25 years in theoretical Chinese syntax. In 2015, Huang received a Festschrift comprising the work of 21 specialists in Chinese syntax, which is headlined by his own most recent publication on the subject of both synchronic and diachronic approaches to syntactic analyticity in Chinese parametric grammar. In 2026, another Festschrift was published in his honor featuring articles by 23 authors highlighting new developments in the analysis of Asian languages and their insights for current syntactic theory.

On 24 April 2024, Huang announced his retirement after teaching for 45 years.

== Books ==
- C.-T. James Huang; Y. H. Audrey Li; Andrew Simpson (27 February 2014). The Handbook of Chinese Linguistics. Wiley. ISBN 978-1-118-58454-5.
- C.-T. James Huang; Audrey Li Yen Hui (6 December 2012). New Horizons in Chinese Linguistics. Springer Science & Business Media. ISBN 978-94-009-1608-1.
- C.-T. James Huang; Robert May (6 December 2012). Logical Structure and Linguistic Structure: Cross-Linguistic Perspectives. Springer Science & Business Media. ISBN 978-94-011-3472-9.
- C.-T. James Huang (15 April 2010). Between Syntax and Semantics. Routledge. ISBN 978-1-135-21758-7.
- C.-T. James Huang; Y.-H. Audrey Li; Yafei Li (19 March 2009). The Syntax of Chinese. Cambridge University Press. ISBN 978-0-521-59058-7.
- Peter Cole; Gabriella Hermon; C.-T. James Huang (17 October 2000). Long Distance Reflexives. BRILL. ISBN 978-1-84950-874-2.
- C.-T. James Huang (1998). Logical Relations in Chinese and the Theory of Grammar. Taylor & Francis. ISBN 978-0-8153-3136-0.
