= Yuli, Hualien =

Yuli Township Hanzi: 玉里鎮 Japanese: Tamazato (Kanji: 玉里 [たまざと]) Amis: Posko; Bunun: Pusqu (Hanzi transliterated by 1917: 璞石閣)
- Urban township
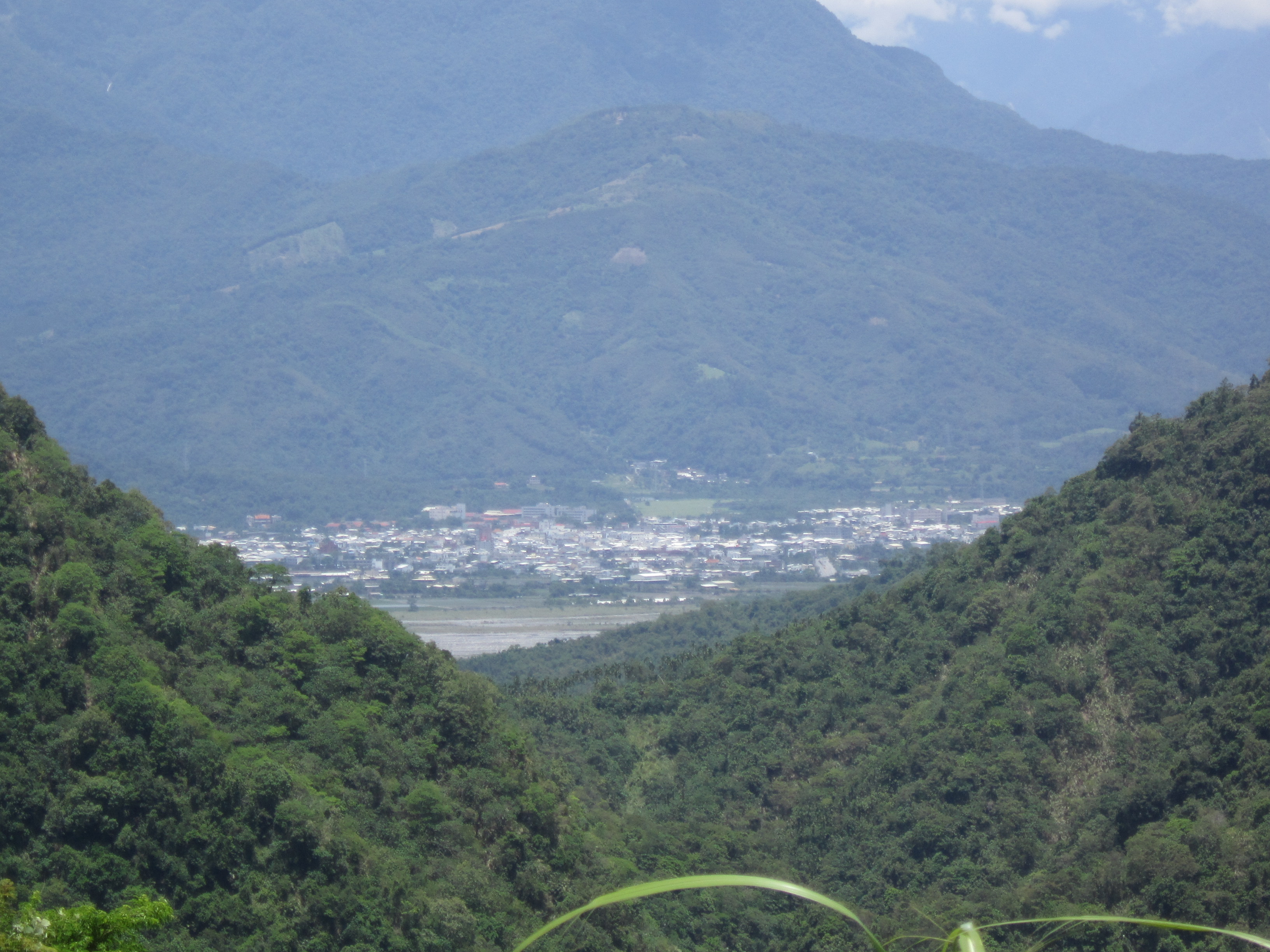
- Aerial view of Yuli Township

- Location within Taiwan
- Coordinates: 23°23′15″N 121°22′35″E
- Country: Republic of China (Taiwan)
- Region: Eastern Taiwan
- County: Hualien County

Government
  - Type: Township council

Area
  - Total: 252.3719 km^{2} (97.4413 sq mi)

Population (March 2023)
  - Total: 22,305
- Time zone: UTC+8 (CST)
- Postal code: 981
- Subdivision: 15 villages
- Website: HLYL.gov.tw

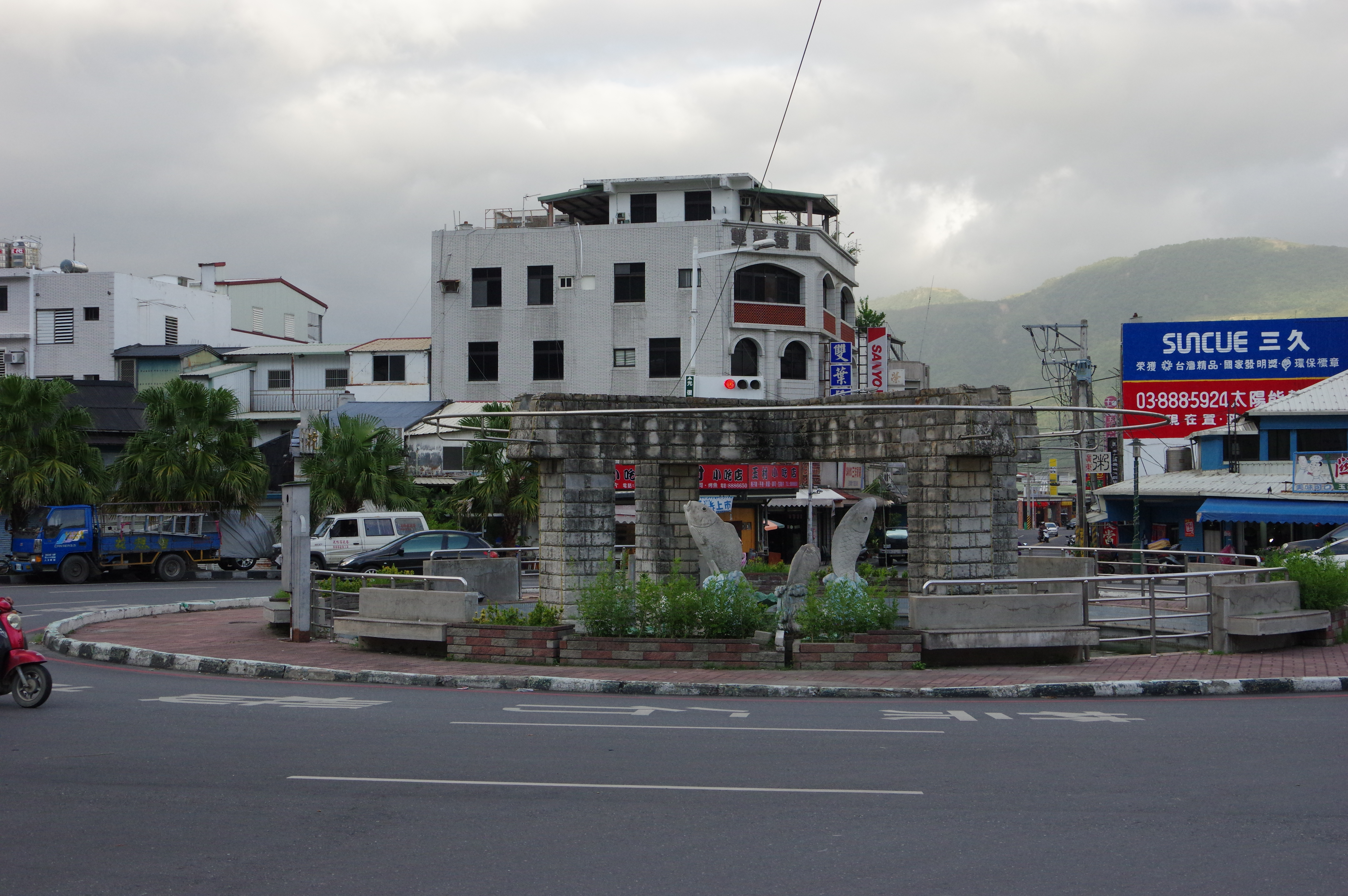
Downtown Yuli

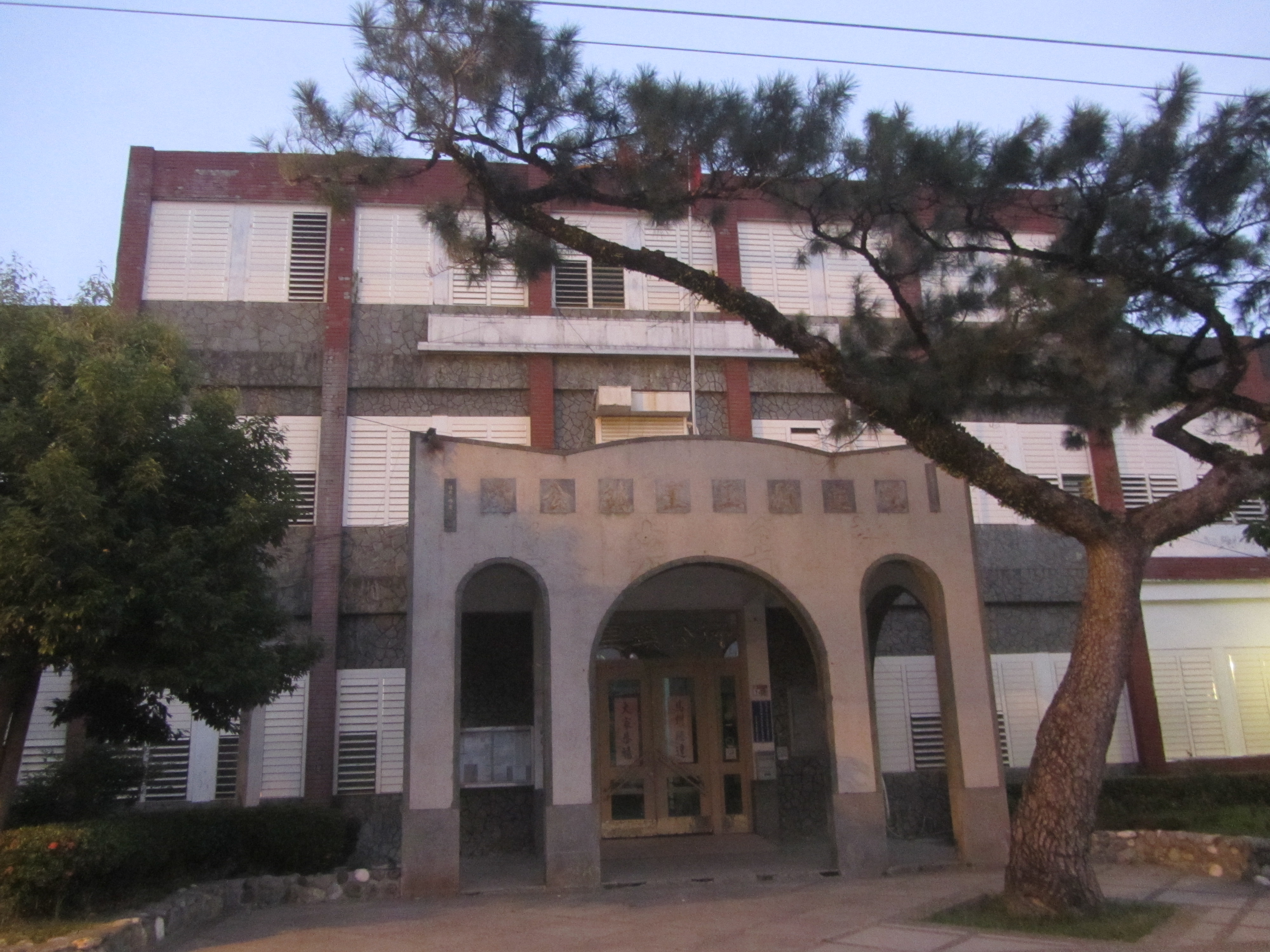
Yuli Township Office

Yuli Township (Chinese: 玉里鎮; pinyin: Yùlǐ Zhèn; Pe̍h-ōe-jī: Gio̍k-lí-tìn; Japanese: Tamazato [ Kanji: 玉里 [たまざと] ]), Amis: Posko, Bunun: Pusqu (Hanzi transliterated by 1917: 璞石閣), is an urban township located in central Huadong Valley, and also the southern administrative center of Hualien County, Taiwan. It has a population of 22,305 inhabitants and 15 villages.

== Geography ==
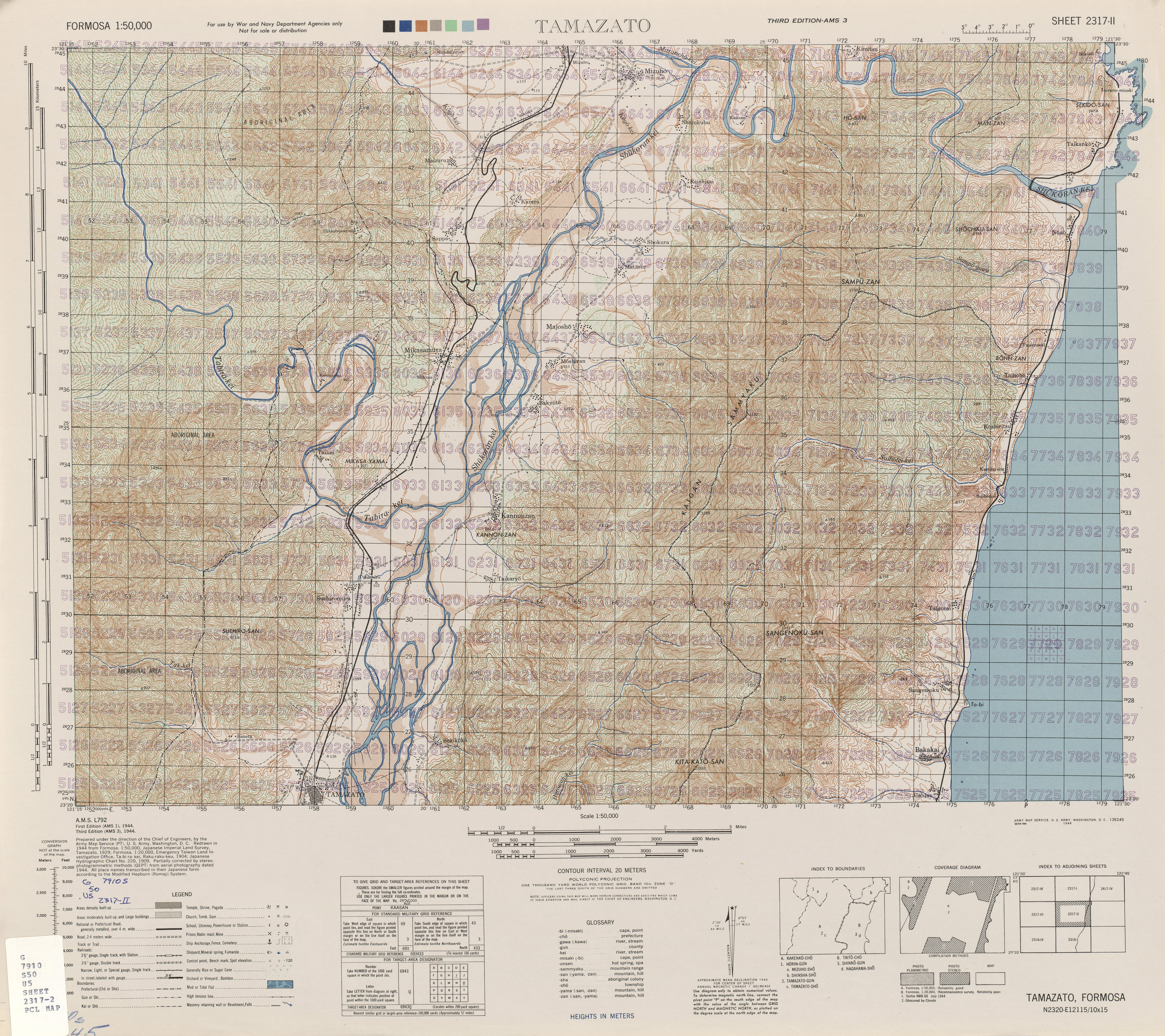
Map of Yuli (labeled as TAMAZATO) and surrounding areas (1944)

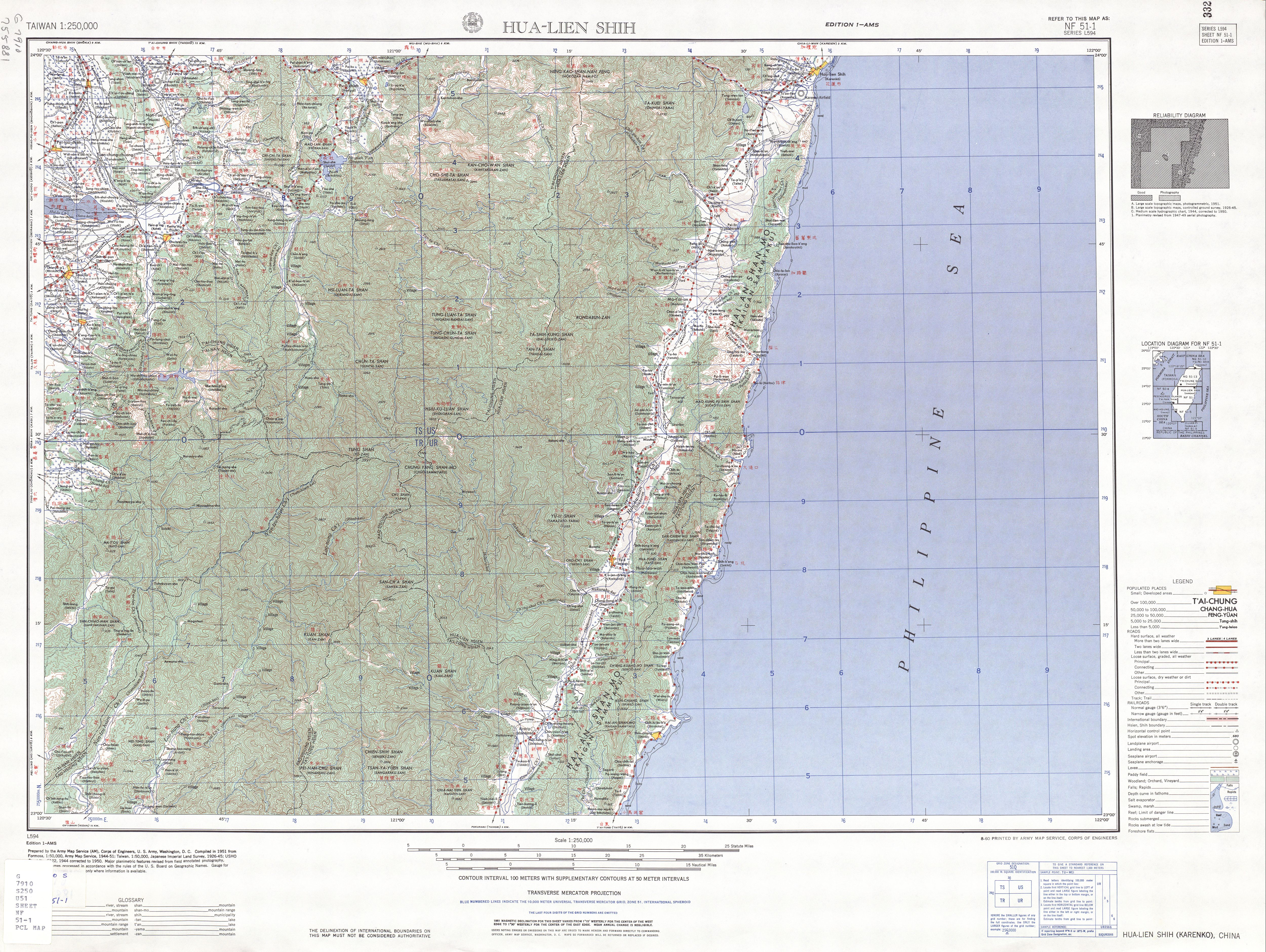
Map including Yuli (labeled as Yü-li (Tamazato) 玉里) (1951)

The township is located in the Huadong Valley.

== Administrative divisions ==
The township comprises 15 villages: Chunri, Dayu, Dewu, Guanyin, Guowu, Lege, Qimo, Sanmin, Songpu, Taichang, Tungfeng, Yongchang, Yuancheng, Zhangliang, and Zhongcheng.

== Tourist attractions ==
- Antong Hot Springs
- Dongfeng Leisure Farm
- Mount Chihke
- Teifen Waterfalls
- Xietian Temple
- Yucyuan Temple
- Yuli Jinja
- Walami Trail
- Yushan National Park

== Transportation ==
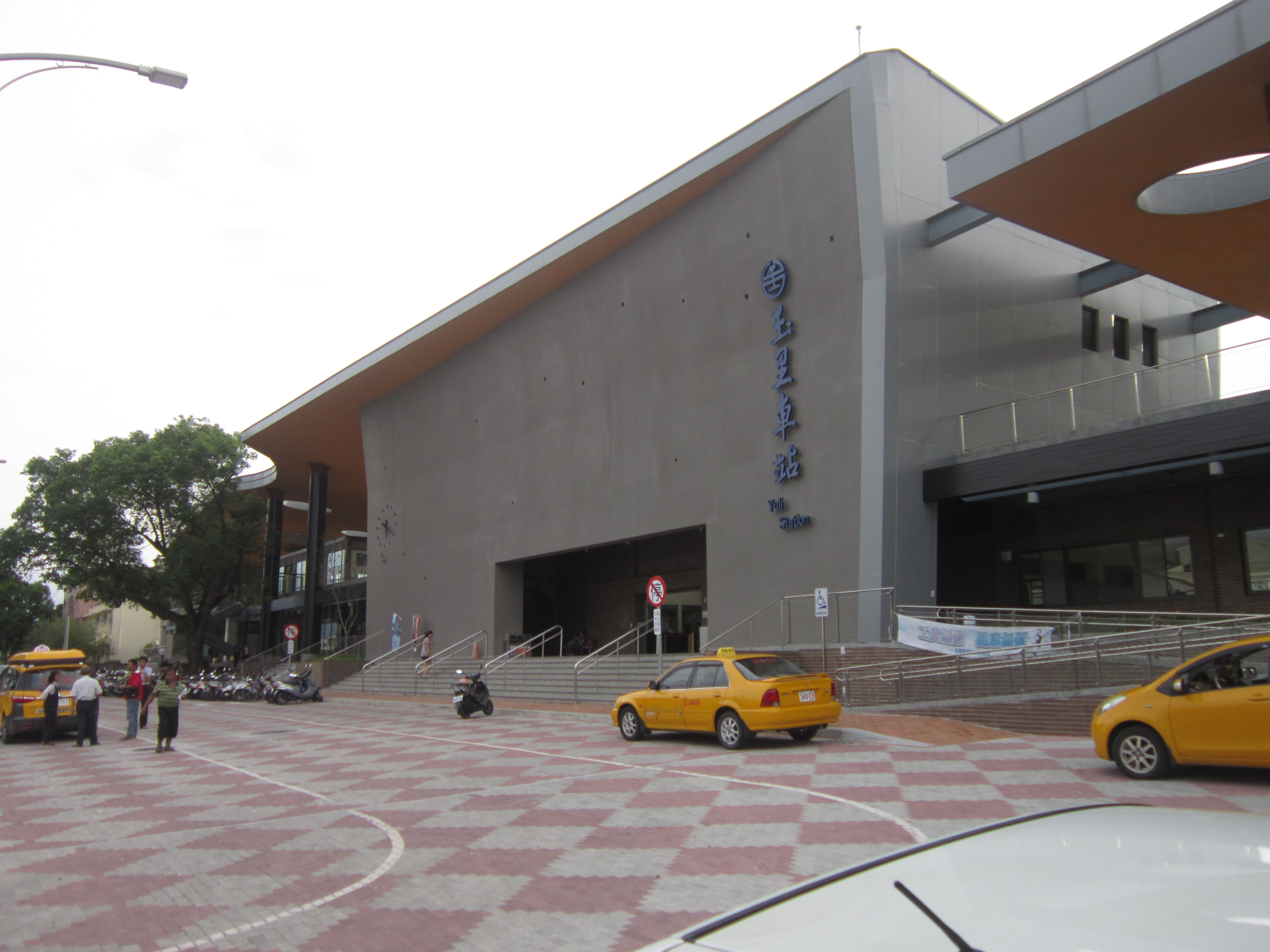
Yuli Rail Station

=== Railway ===
TR (Taitung line)

- Yuli Station
- Sanmin Station

=== Road ===
- Provincial Highway 9 (Hualien-Taitung Highway)
- Provincial Highway 30 (Yuli-Chengbin Highway)
- County Road No.193

=== Bus ===
- Hualien Bus Company

== Notable natives ==
- Evonne Hsieh, actress
- Umin Boya, writer, director and actor
- Wu Maw-kuen, Minister of Education (2018)
