= Chihshang, Taitung =

Rural township in Taitung County, Taiwan

Coordinates: 23°07′N 121°13′E

Chihshang Township 池上鄉 Ikegami
- Rural township
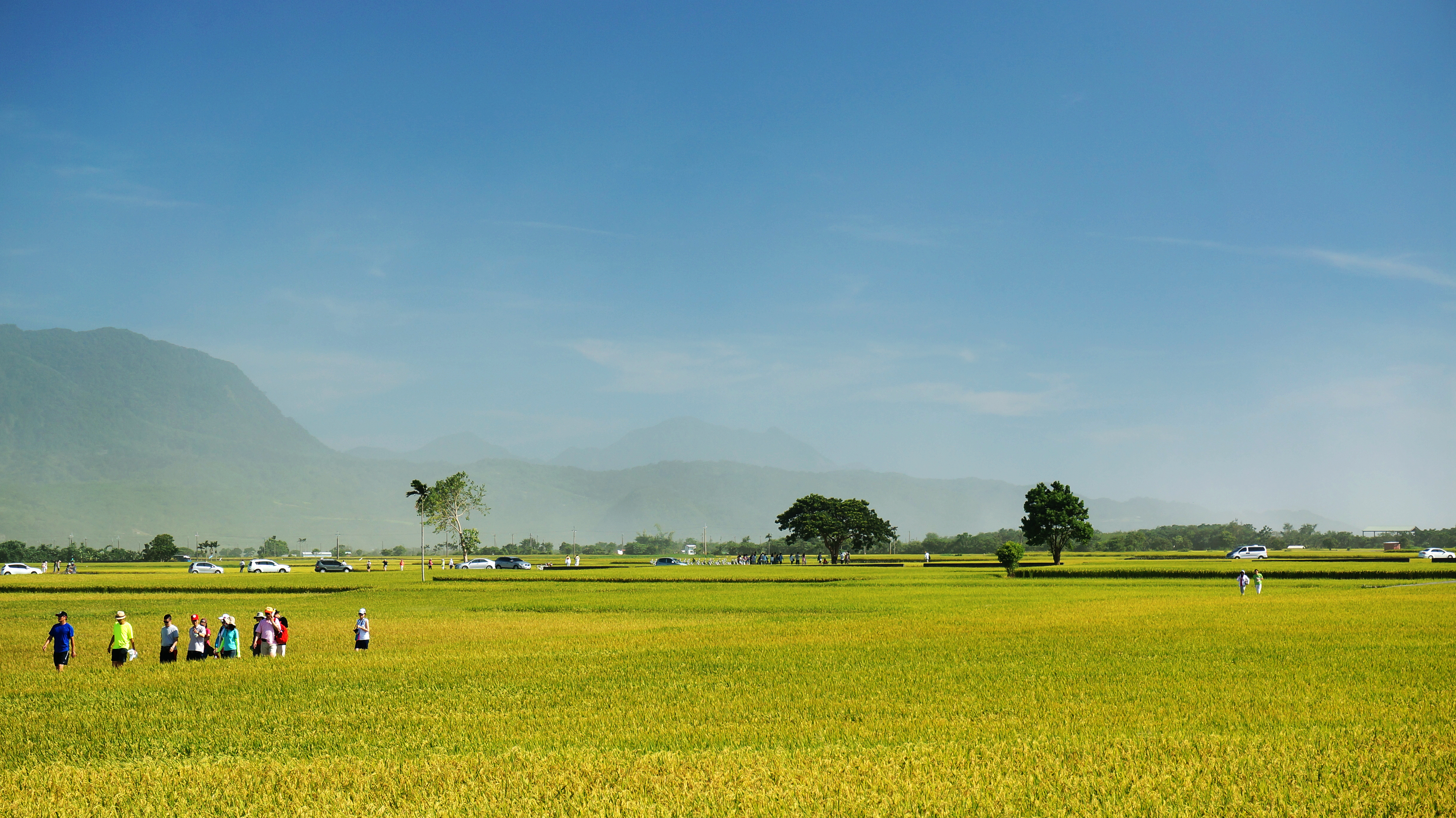

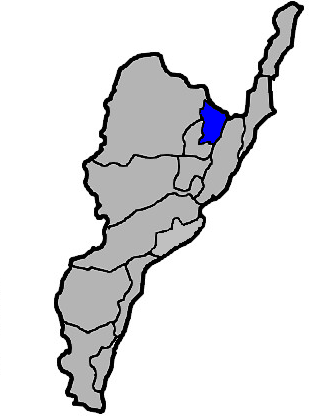
- Chishang Township in Taitung County
- Location: Taitung County, Taiwan

Area
  - Total: 83 km^{2} (32 sq mi)

Population (February 2023)
  - Total: 7,978
  - Density: 96/km^{2} (250/sq mi)

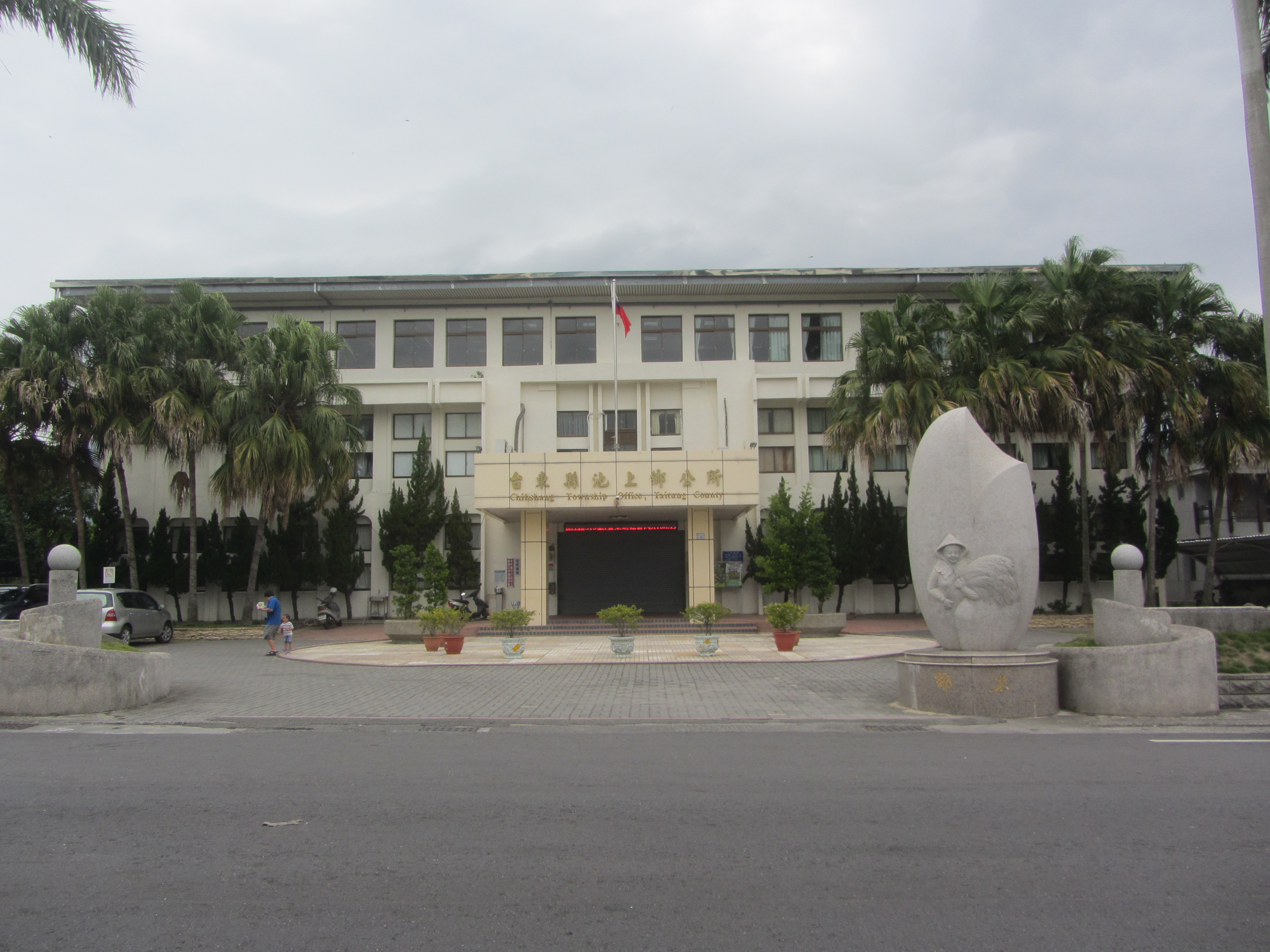
Chihshang Township Office

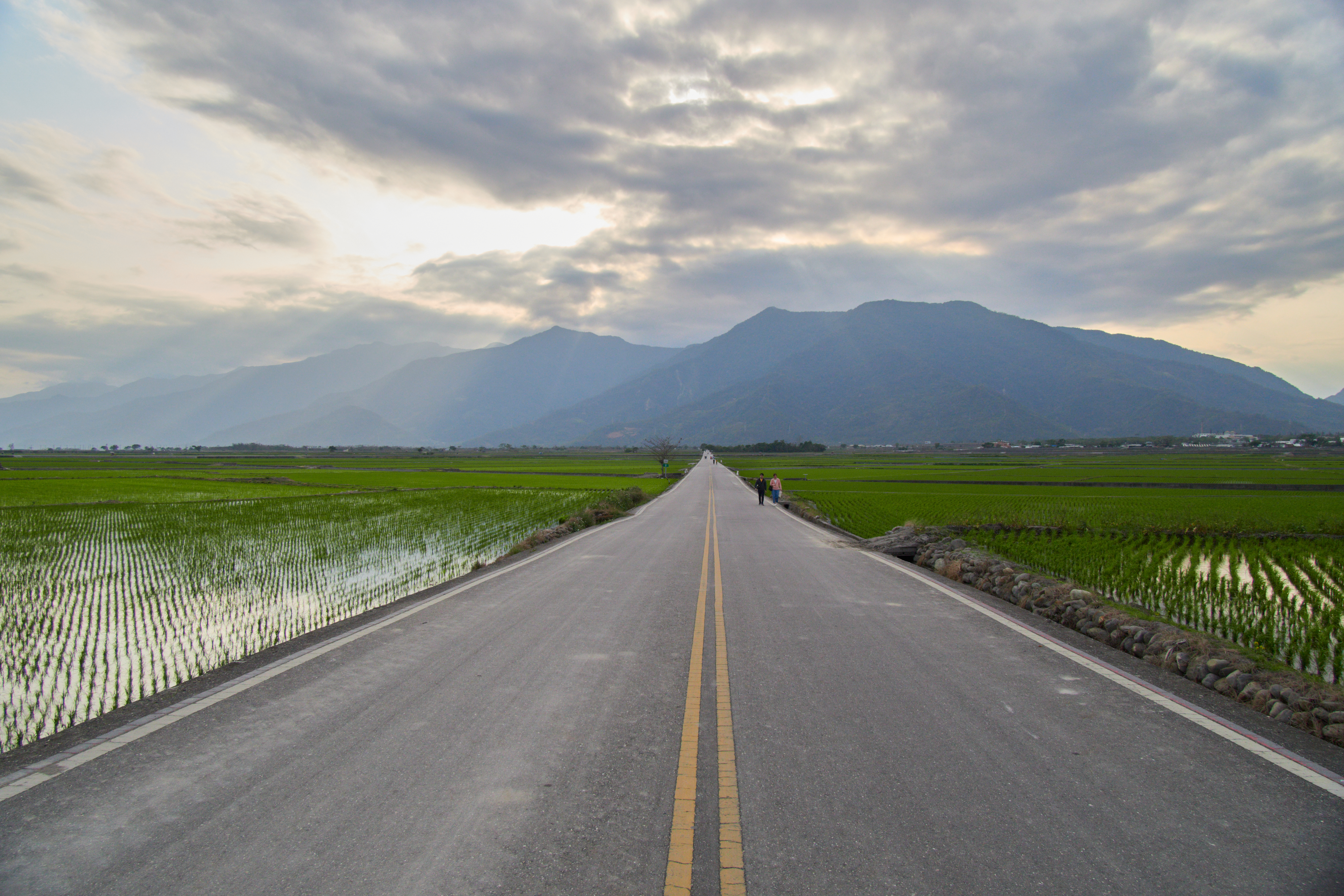
Mr. Brown Avenue, a car-less avenue through the rice fields

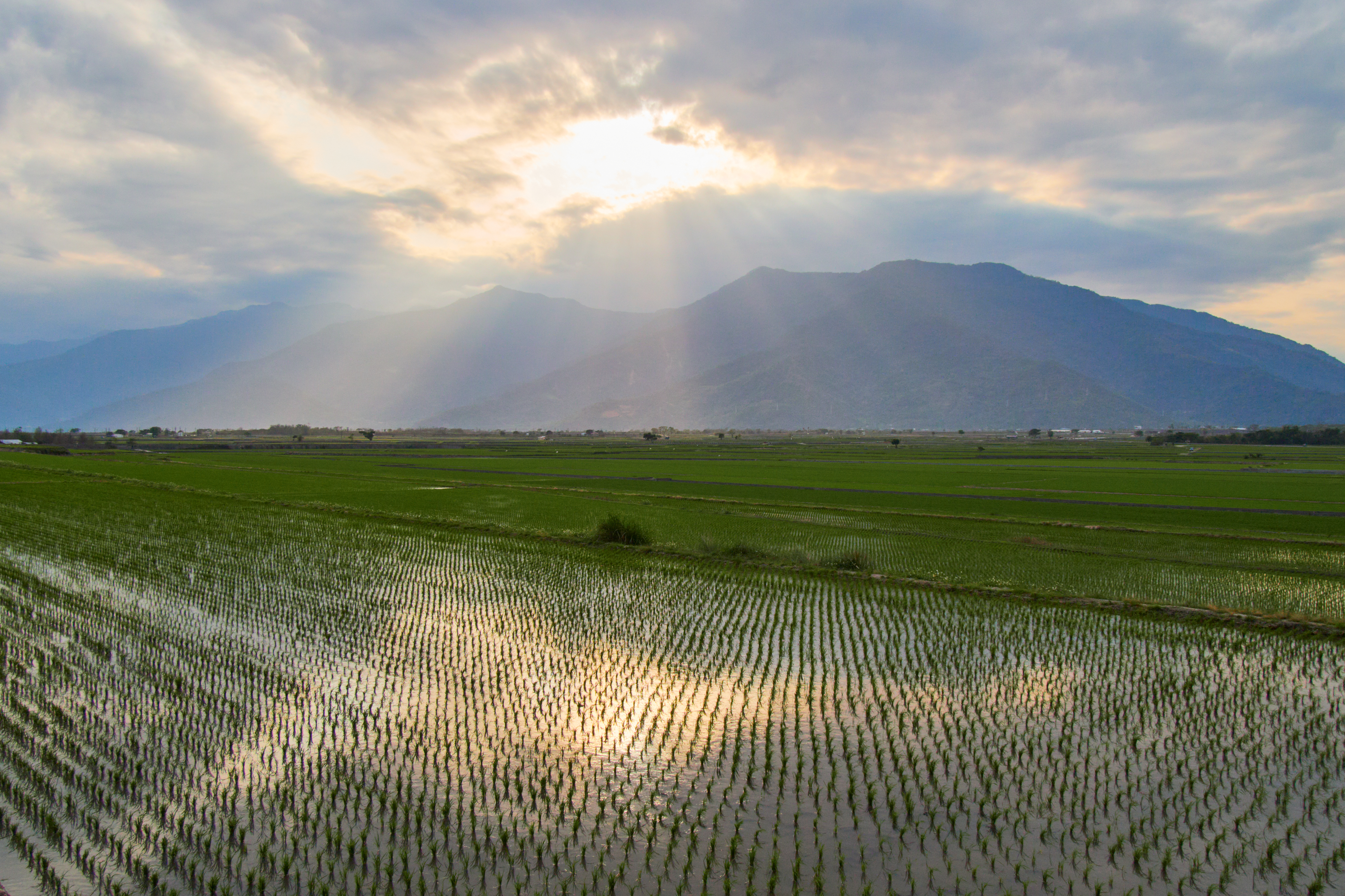
Rice fields of Chishang

Chihshang Township (Chinese: 池上鄉; Hanyu Pinyin: Chíshàng Xiāng; Tongyong Pinyin: Chíhshàng Siang) is a rural township in Taitung County, Taiwan.

Chihshang was founded by indigenous Makatao from Pingtung 160 years ago, along with the other immigrants, including Taivoan from Kaohsiung and very few Siraya from Tainan later in the 1950s. The indigenous Night Ceremony has been held in Chihshang annually in November.

== Geography ==
The township is located at the Huatung Valley.

== Administrative divisions ==
The township comprises 10 villages: Dapo, Dapu, Fuwen, Fuxing, Fuyuan, Jinyuan, Qingfeng, Wanan, Xinxing and Zhenxing.

== Tourist attractions ==
- Chihshang Silkworm Recreation Farm
- Dapo Pond
- Du's Garden
- Hakka Cultural Park
- Mr. Brown Avenue
- Rice Village Museum
- Taitung Veteran's Farm
- Taiwan Sugar Pastoral Farm Resort
- Wu Tao Chishang Lunch Box Cultural History Museum

== Transportation ==
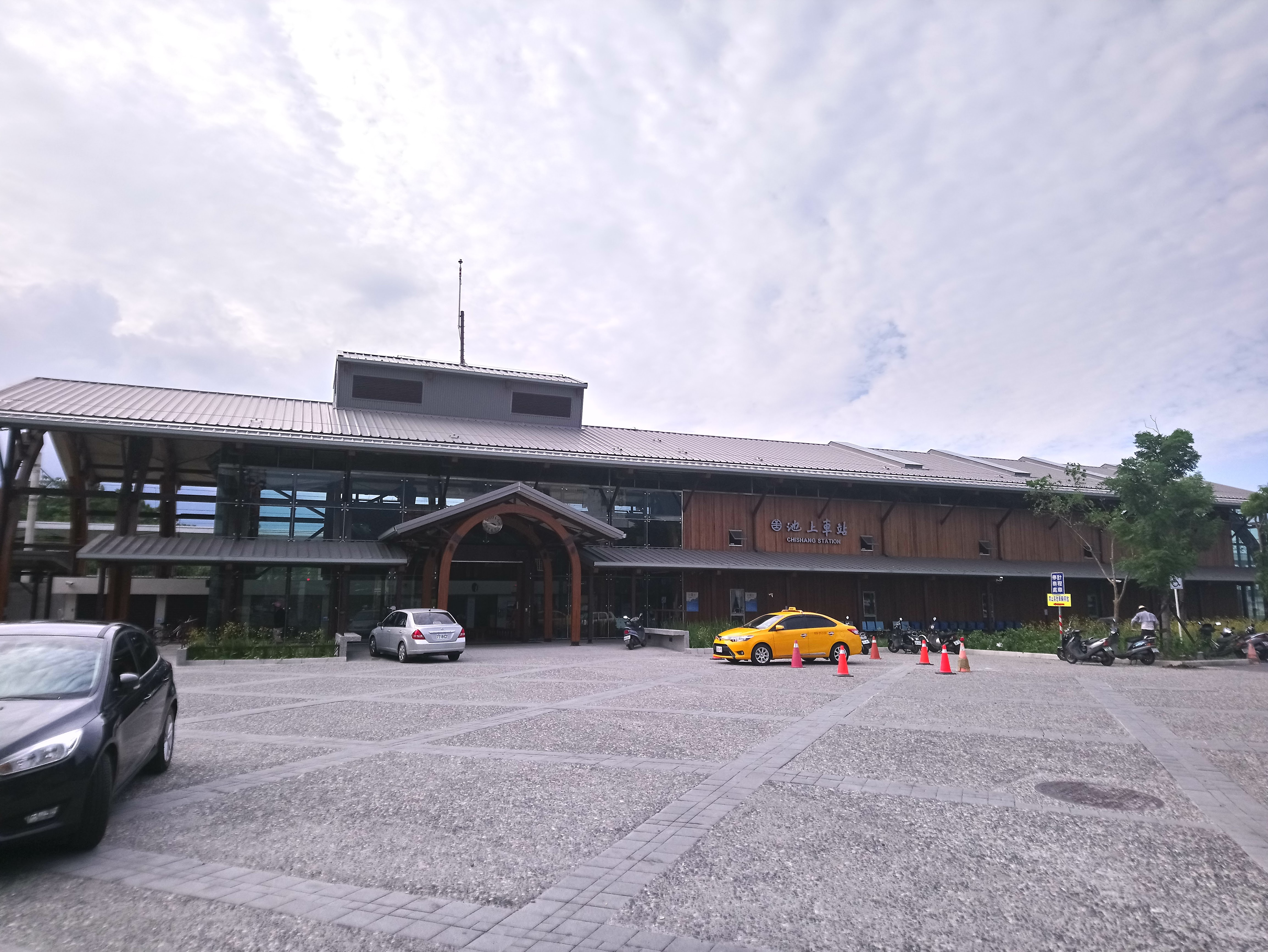
Chihshang Station

- Chihshang Station
