= 2021 Hualien train derailment =

Railway accident in Taiwan

TRA's Train No. 408 at Qingshui Tunnel
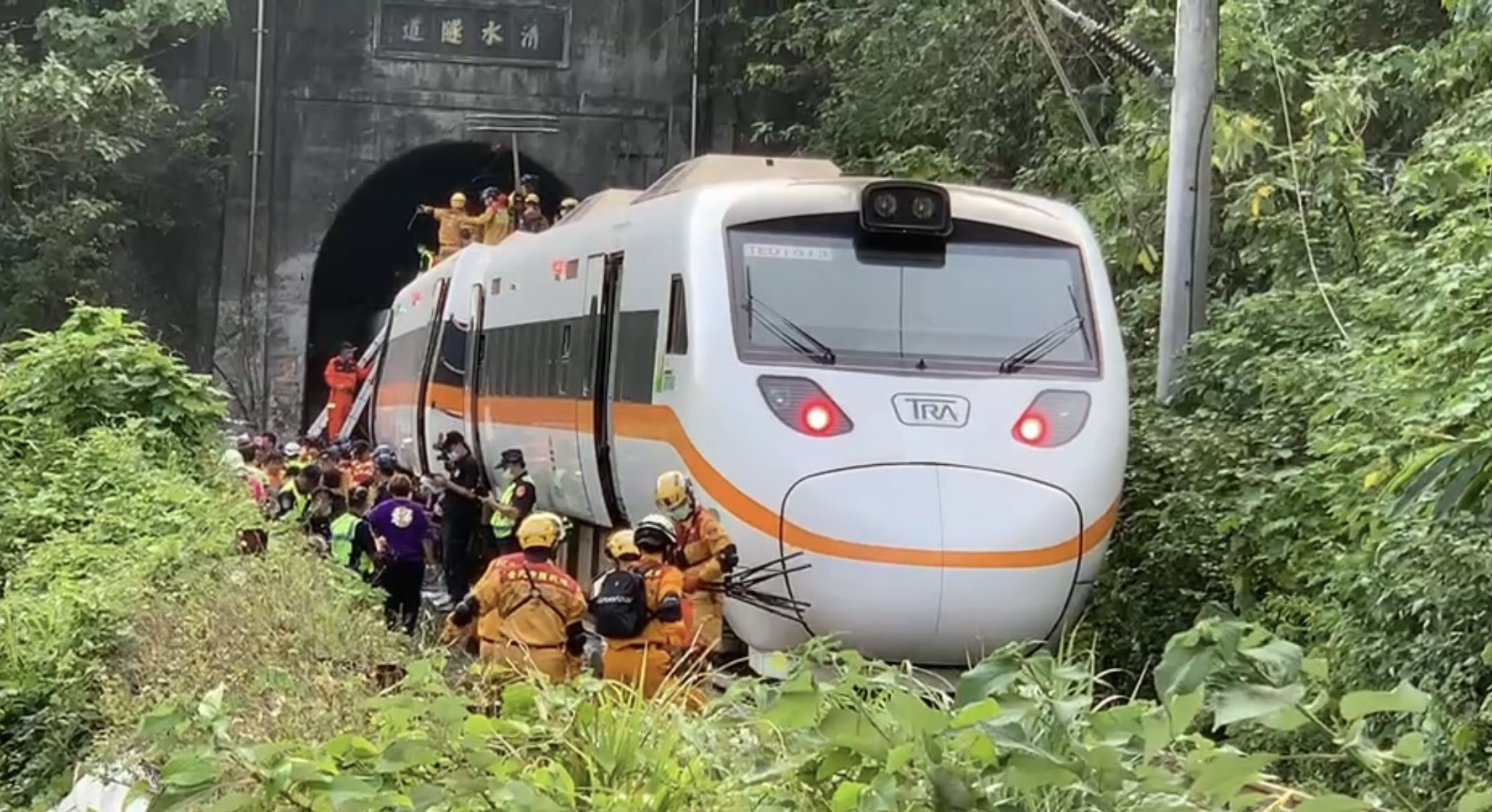
- The derailed Taroko Express trainset, as seen from outside the entrance to the tunnel

Details
- Date: 2 April 2021; 09:28 NST (01:28 UTC)
- Location: Qingshui Tunnel, Xiulin; Hualien County
- Coordinates: 24.2171°N 121.6883°E
- Country: Taiwan
- Line: North-link line, Eastern Trunk line Between Heren and Chongde stations (51.45 km (31.97 mi) from Su'aoxin station)
- Operator: Taiwan Railways Administration
- Owner: Taiwan Railways Administration
- Service: 408 Taroko Express bound for Taitung
- Incident type: Derailment, collision
- Cause: Collision with truck that rolled down slope onto track

Statistics
- Trains: 1
- Vehicles: 1
- Passengers: 494 (Note: The tickets were split between 372 tickets with seats and 122 standing tickets.)
- Crew: 4
- Deaths: 49
- Injured: 202
Route map

On 2 April 2021, at 09:28 NST (01:28 UTC), a Taroko Express train operated by the Taiwan Railways Administration (TRA) derailed at the north entrance of Qingshui Tunnel in Heren Section, Xiulin Township, Hualien County, Taiwan, killing 49 people and injuring at least two others, making it the deadliest railway accident in Taiwan in terms of confirmed deaths. The Taiwan Transportation Safety Board titled this rail accident of "TRA's Train No. 408 at Qingshui Tunnel" (Chinese: 0402臺鐵第408次車清水隧道重大鐵道事故).

At the time of the derailment, the train was carrying 494 passengers. The eight-carriage train derailed after colliding with a construction truck that had fallen down a slope onto the tracks north of Hualien City; the train came to rest in the tunnel, with severe damage and many casualties. The incident was primarily due to human factors and was preventable, as an investigation from The New York Times revealed that it was "systemic failures at a government agency" including "a culture of complacency and weak oversight", that had made the disaster possible.

== Background ==
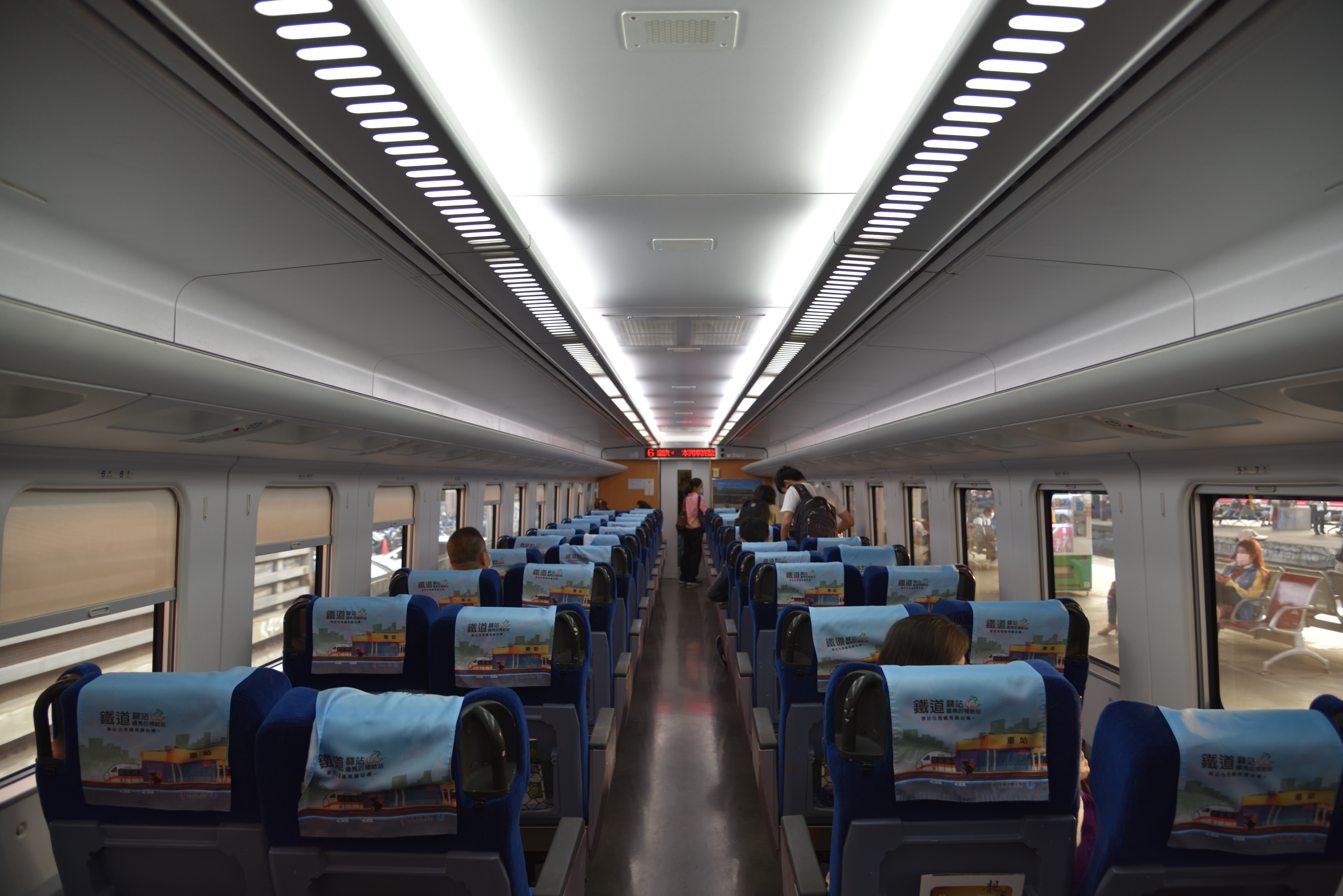
Interior of a Taroko Express in 2021

The accident occurred on the first day of a four-day Qingming Festival holiday, which is typically a period of high traffic with people visiting the graves of deceased family members. Many passengers had been standing at the time of the accident.

The Taroko Express is operated using eight-car, 376-seat trains. It is part of the Tze-chiang limited express service, the highest-class service in the TRA system. Since the Taroko Express is a tilting train (Note: Carriages used on the Taroko Express belong to the TEMU1000 series, where the 'T' stands for "tilting".) with a maximum operating speed of 130 km/h (81 mph), the TRA originally did not sell standing tickets for these trains due to safety concerns. However, in order to increase the supply of available tickets during periods of high demand, the TRA began selling up to 120 standing tickets for each trainset on 2 May 2019, after it said it had performed detailed safety tests.

The route involved runs along the mountainous east coast of Taiwan, passing by the Taroko National Park and the Taroko Gorge, the namesake of the express and a popular destination for the long weekend. The Qingshui Tunnel is a pair of single-tracked tunnels that cut through Qingshui Cliff. In April 2019, the TRA began construction to improve the slope stability near the north end of the tunnel by constructing a rock shed over the western track. At the time of the accident, construction was nearly complete. (Note: The work was originally scheduled to be completed by 20 January 2021.)

== Derailment ==
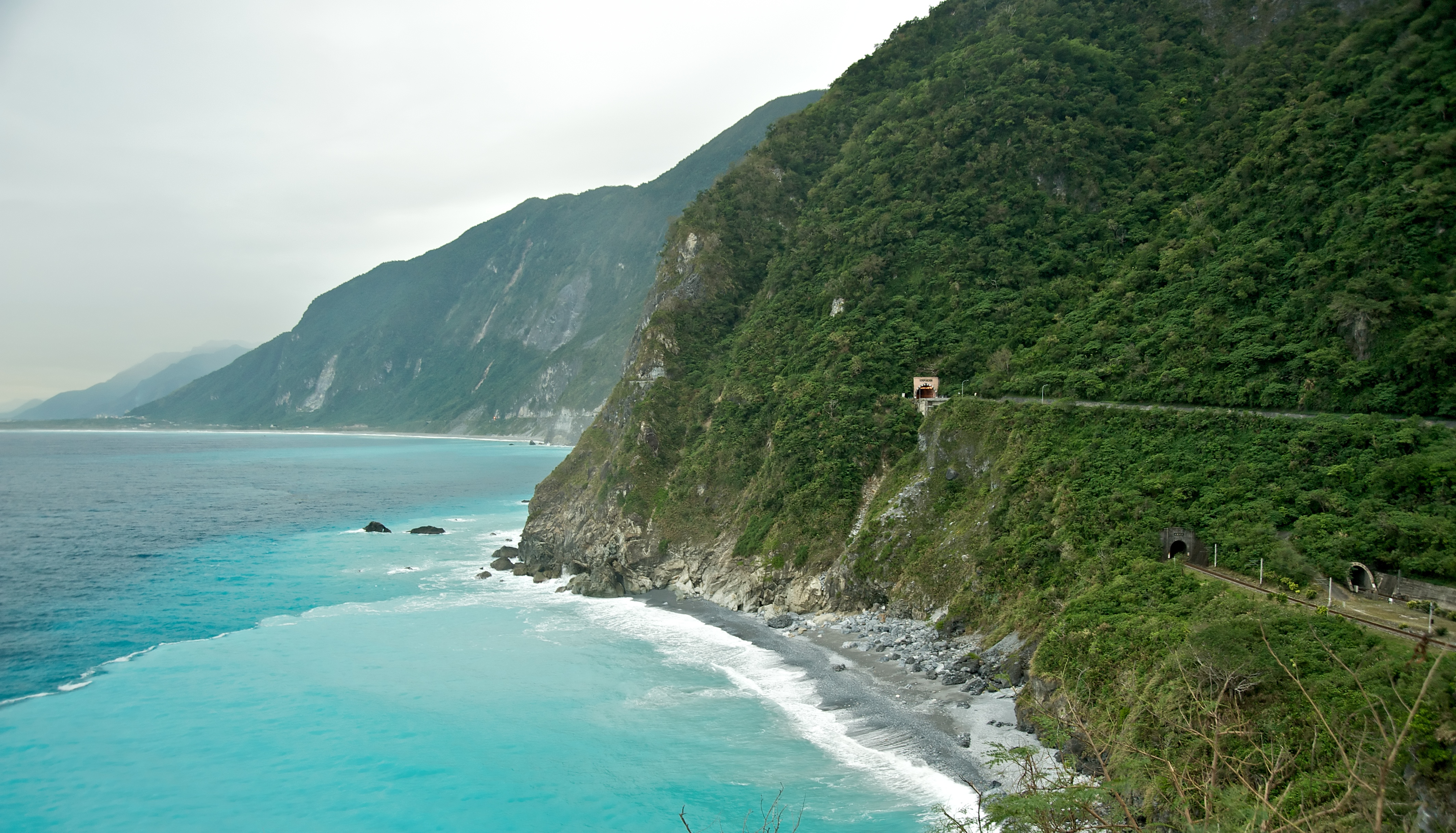
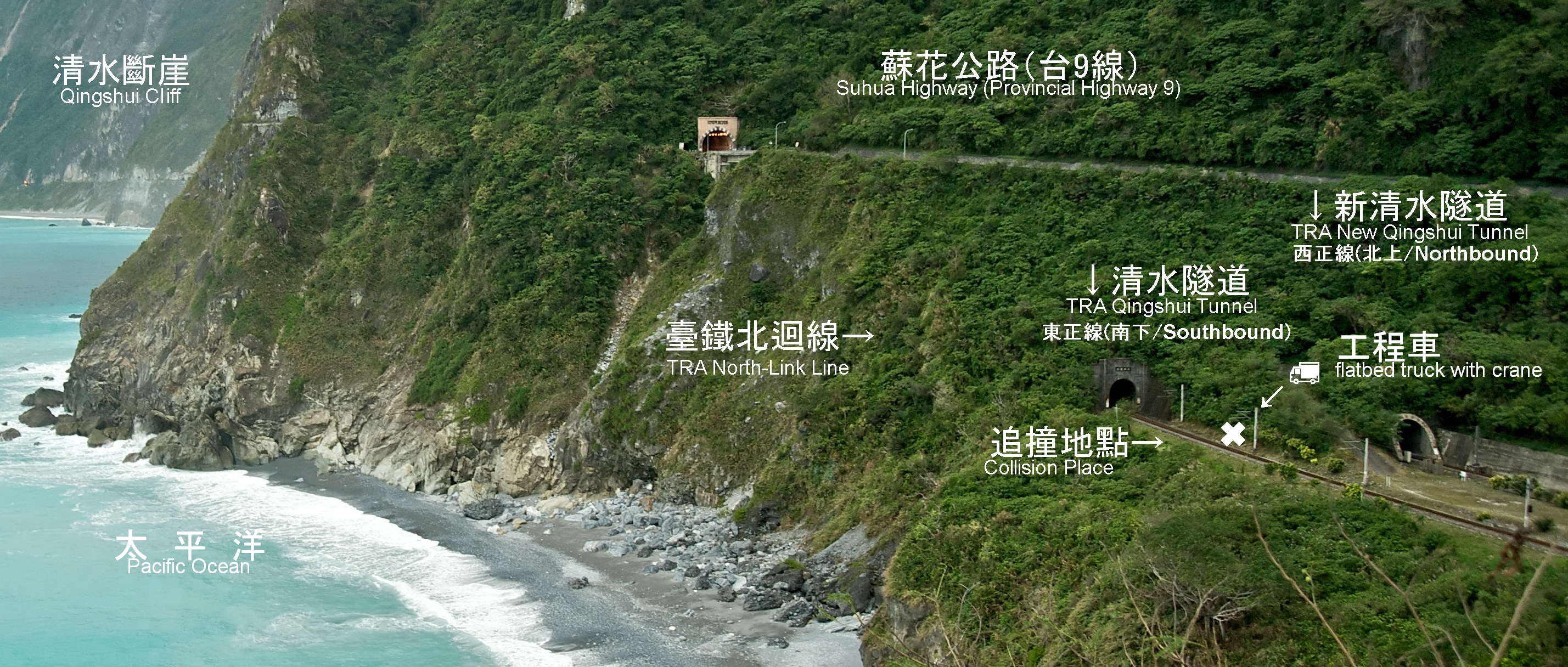
Qingshui Cliffs from the north in 2009. The second tunnel from the right near the bottom is the accident site. The image on the right is an annotated version.

On 2 April 2021, a southbound Taroko Express train numbered 408 left Shulin in New Taipei at 07:16 NST heading for Taitung. The train was scheduled to arrive at Hualien at 09:39 NST.

At 09:28 NST (01:28 UTC), the train derailed as it was entering Qingshui Tunnel, between Heren and Chongde. It was carrying 494 passengers and 4 staff members in eight carriages, and was travelling on the eastern track. According to media reports, a flatbed truck (Note: Sources have also referred to the construction vehicle as a "crane truck".) used in the slope stabilization project slid about 20 metres (66 ft) down the side of a hill, fell onto the tracks, and was struck by the oncoming train, which was travelling at 125 kilometres per hour (78 mph) when the driver spotted the obstruction. A brake application had only reduced the speed to 121 kilometres per hour (75 mph) at the time of the collision. The front of the train derailed to the left, and struck the portal as it entered the tunnel and left side of the front car was sheared off. At the time, no construction was actively being carried out, in observance of the holiday. (Note: Deputy Minister of Transportation and Communications Chi Wen-jong, who is also acting director of the TRA, stated that the TRA had ordered work at the site to be halted on 31 March 2021, before the start of the holiday weekend, adding that he did not understand why workers had reported that the construction site manager had been at the site that morning.) The driver of the truck was not in the vehicle during the derailment.

Car number 8, at the front of the train, (Note: The carriage numbers are arranged with carriage number 1 towards Taipei Station and with carriage number 8 towards Taitung Station. As the train was heading south, towards Taitung, carriage number 8 was at the front of the train.) collided with the truck shortly before entering the tunnel, partially derailing the train. The train then entered the tunnel, with the front of the train also crashing into the tunnel's interior walls as the carriages piled up. Car Nos. 7 and 8 were heavily damaged, and accounted for most of the fatalities. Car Nos. 8 through 3, the front six carriages, were trapped in the tunnel when the train came to a halt, with Car No. 3 having only partially entered the tunnel.

== Casualties ==
Forty-nine people were confirmed killed in the accident, including 47 passengers, the train driver and the assistant train driver, while another 202 were injured, several in critical condition. The majority of the deceased were in carriages 7 and 8. Seventy-two people were temporarily trapped in the wreckage of the train.

Classes from an elementary school and a university were among the passengers. Four students died: a 6-year-old kindergarten girl and three university students; 32 others from school and university were injured, including a teacher.

Published by Hualien County Government
Type	Country/territory	Fatalities	Injuries
Crew	Taiwan	2	(Note: Train conductor)1
Passengers	Taiwan	44	193
Passengers	United States	2	-
Passengers	France	1	-
Passengers	Japan	-	2
Passengers	Australia	-	2
Passengers	Macau	-	1
Passengers	China	-	1
Total		49	200

== Aftermath ==
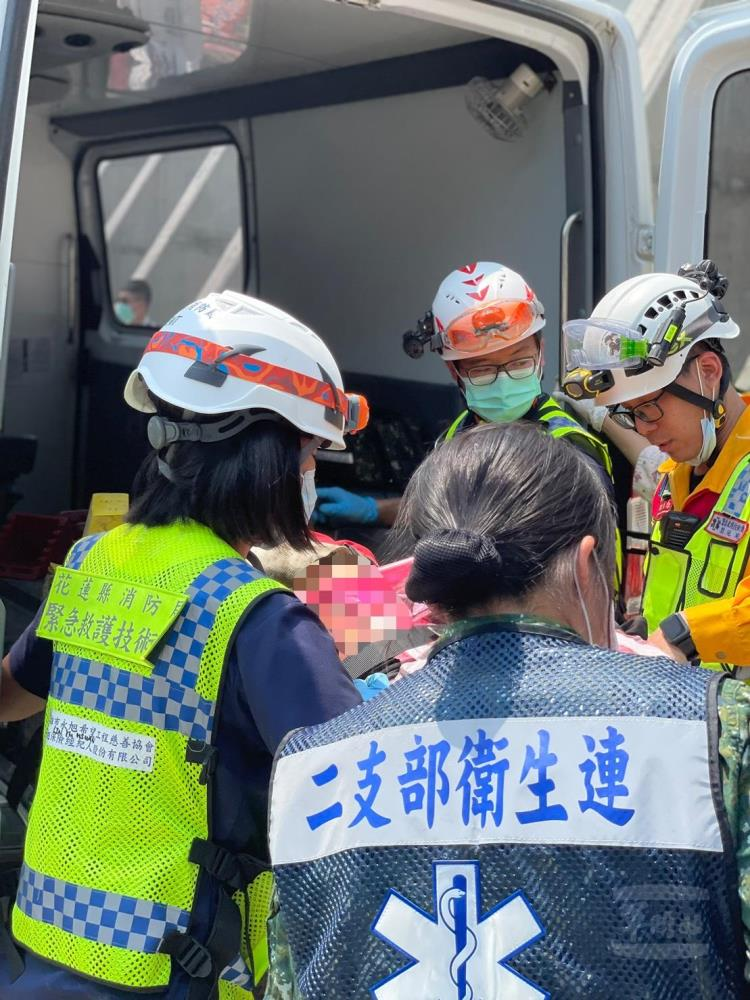
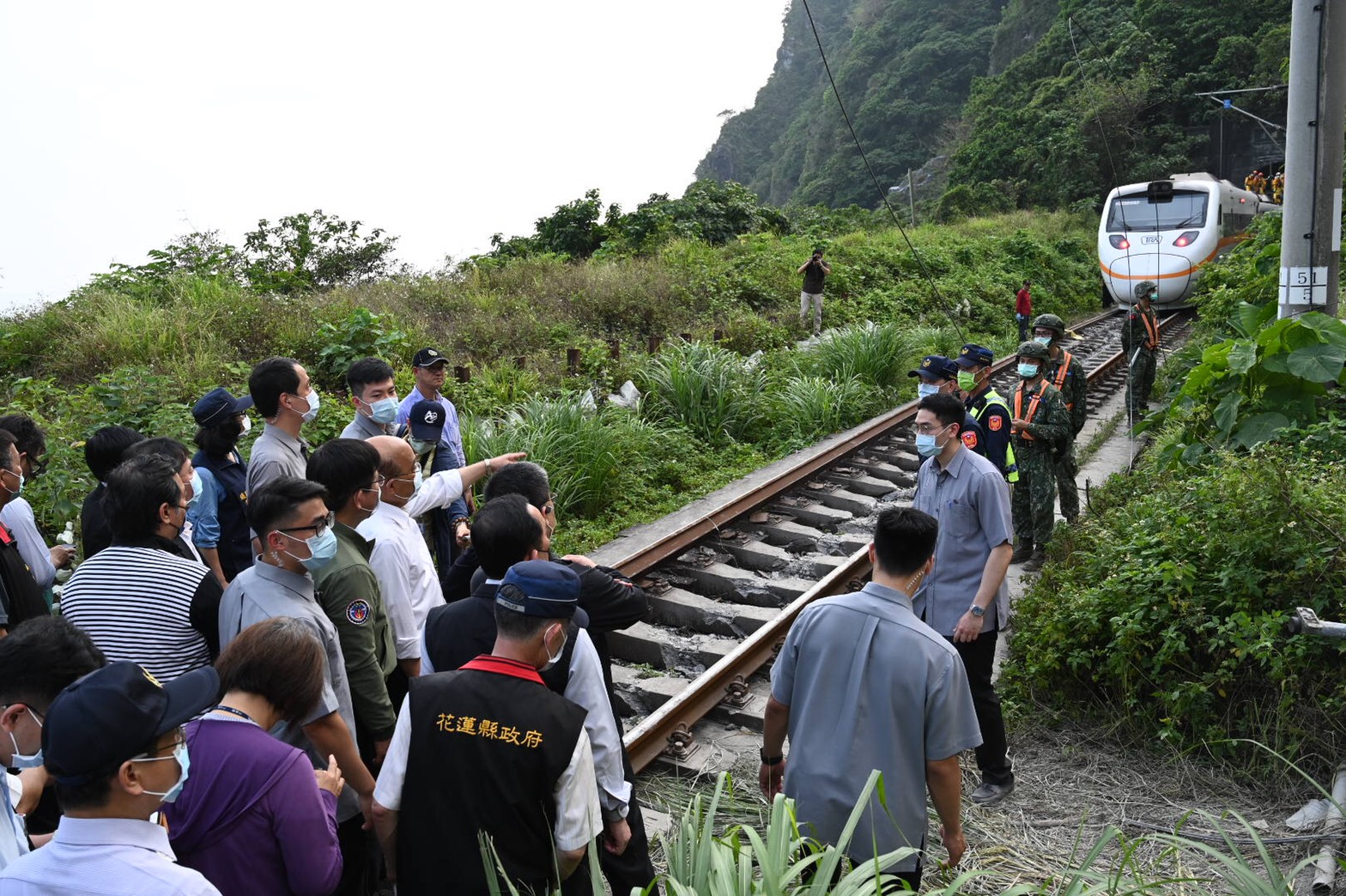
Medical officers and other officials assist with the rescue effort

More than 150 emergency personnel, including search and rescue workers and members of the military, were dispatched to the derailment site. Over 80 people were evacuated from the train's rear four carriages, while the remaining four carriages were described as "deformed" and harder to access.

The rear two carriages had been removed from the tracks by the next morning, while the removal of the third occurred later that night. After the dashcam of the truck involved and one of its two memory cards were found, work was halted temporarily to search for the second memory card. The fourth carriage was eventually removed from the tunnel late in the afternoon.

Minister of Transportation and Communications Lin Chia-lung and Minister of Interior Hsu Kuo-yung coordinated rescue efforts along with other ministries and local government officials. Minister Lin stated that he would take full political responsibility for the crash. He announced his resignation to the Government on 4 April, and will leave once the rescue work ends.

The Executive Yuan ordered the lowering of national flags to half-mast at all public schools and government agencies for three days beginning on 3 April in honor of those who died.

A TRA official stated that the route should be repaired within a week, and that in the meantime trains would run on a parallel track, with delays of about 15 to 20 minutes. Deputy Minister of Transportation and Communications Wang Kwo-tsai later announced that the resumption of services on the damaged track had been postponed to 20 April as questions were raised about whether the crash had any impact to the safety of the area. Wang noted that an engineering consultant firm and an engineering association had been asked to conduct inspections, with the reopening further postponed if issues were raised.

A restriction on the number of standing tickets sold is being considered due to the large number of casualties. In addition, Deputy Minister Wang stated that the TRA would need to review its standard operating procedure with regard to selecting contractors and overseeing work being done at construction sites.

== Investigation and legal actions ==
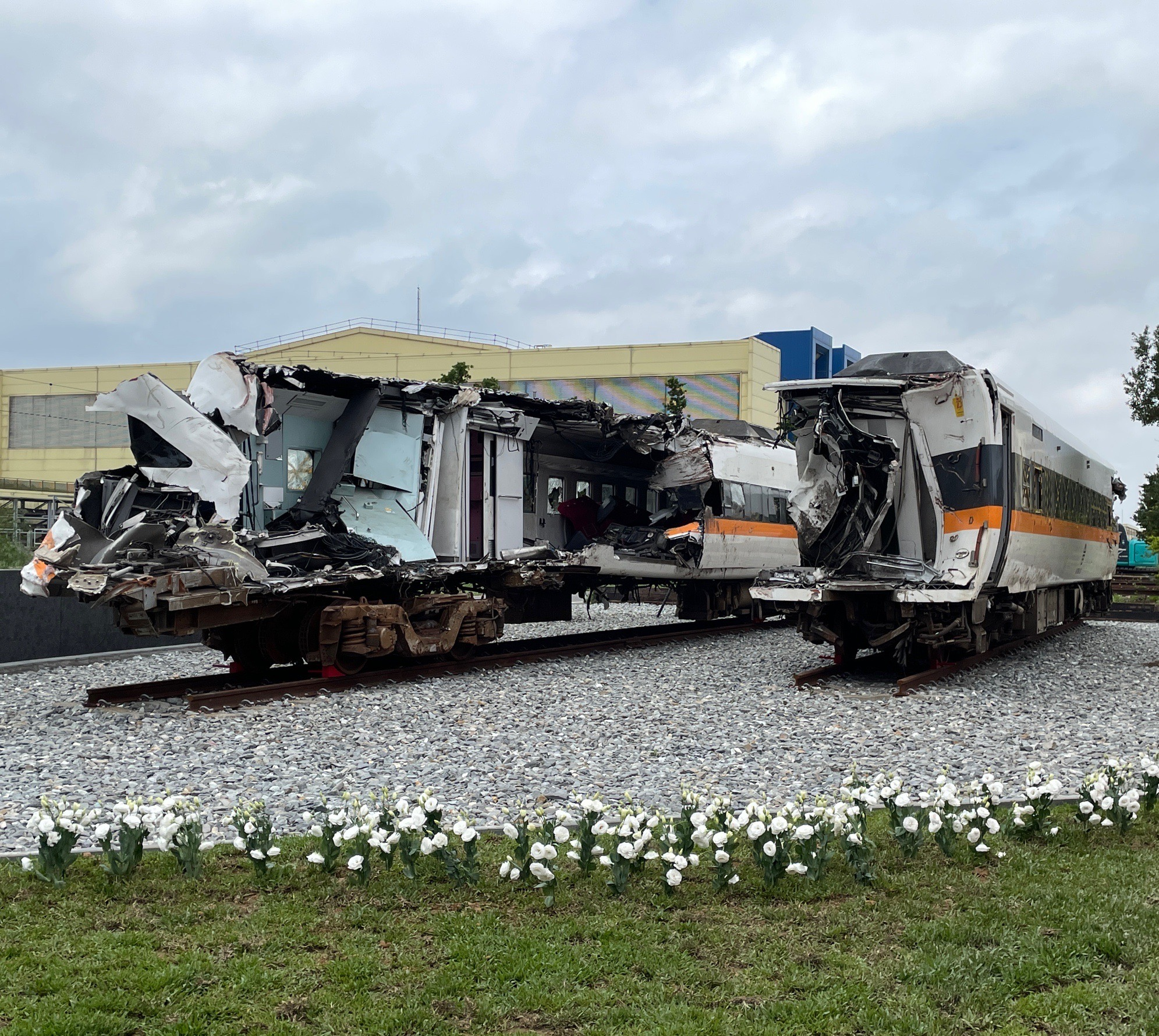
The damaged train seen in 2022 at the TRA's Fugang depot

The Taiwan Transportation Safety Board (TTSB) conducted an investigation. The driver of the construction truck, Lee Yi-hsiang (Chinese: 李義祥; pinyin: Lǐ Yìxiáng; aged 45), was taken into police custody and being investigated to ascertain the cause of the disaster. Lee was released on bail on 4 April 2021, before a court, on appeal, found that he might be a flight risk, and could collude with others and may destroy incriminating evidence on 5 April 2021. He is suspected of parking the vehicle without properly engaging the parking brake, causing the truck to roll down the slope and collide with the train. Prosecutors have requested an arrest warrant for the manager of the construction site, who may be accused of causing death due to negligence and of forging documents.

The Central Emergency Operation Center reported that the train's dashcam footage had been recovered. TTSB Chairman Young Hong-tsu stated that the footage showed that the drivers noticed the truck when the train had exited Heren Tunnel, located about 250 m (820 ft) away from Qingshui Tunnel, and had about 6.9 seconds to respond. Young added that since the train had been travelling at over 100 km/h (62 mph), the drivers could not have stopped the train in time.

Workers also found the truck's dashcam and one of its two memory cards. Deputy Minister Wang noted that no recordings of the area by surveillance cameras had been found. Wang added that the ministry had reasoned that the truck had fallen upon the tracks at most 15 minutes before the accident, since an earlier train had passed through the same section of tracks at 09:13 NST. The time of truck falling upon the tracks could be further narrowed to have happened between 09.21 NST and 09:28 NST as someone managed to take a photo of the truck parked on the road above the slope at 09:21 NST.

Two weeks after the crash, on April 16, authorities announced charges against seven people. According to news reports, on the day of the accident, the construction crane truck driver—also the site hazard inspection manager—and his Vietnamese assistant attempted to free the truck after it got stuck in some bushes near a hairpin turn. Their improvised tow method failed and allowed the truck to roll downhill onto the unprotected tracks; prosecutors say they failed to notify the railway of the dangerous obstruction. Also under investigation are allegations of TRA corruption. One apparent illegal conflict is Lee's role as both site manager and owner of one of the project's construction companies; Lee is accused of lying about his identity to hide this conflict of interest, prohibited by Taiwan's Construction Industry Act.

In late May 2021, the government disciplined a dozen people for the accident and instituted safety inspection procedures before trackside construction projects could resume.

In 2022, Lee Yi-hsiang was sentenced to seven years and ten months in prison, and the MOTC announced that the victims' families would receive NT$150 million in total compensation. In subsequent legal judgements, Lee's prison sentence was increased to twelve years and six months, while contractors were ordered to pay NT$23 million in compensation.

== Reactions ==
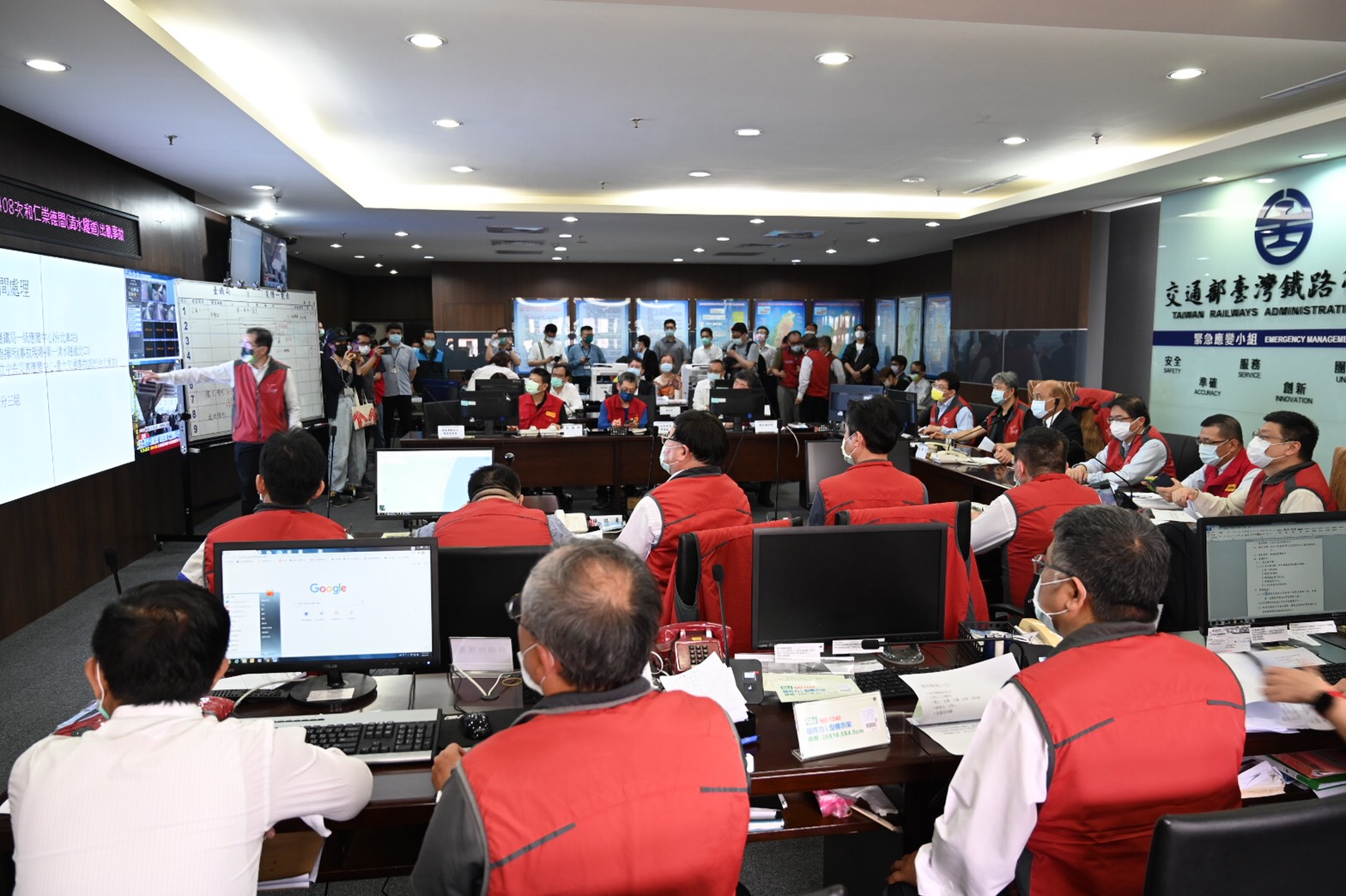
Premier Su Tseng-chang being briefed by TRA officials on the accident

Among those who first surveyed the crash site was Premier Su Tseng-chang.

On 3 April 2021, President Tsai Ing-wen and Magistrate of Hualien County Hsu Chen-wei visited the crash site and also the hospitals where dozens of injured victims were being treated.

China's governing Chinese Communist Party general secretary Xi Jinping and China's Taiwan Affairs Office and Association for Relations Across the Taiwan Straits offered their condolences.

The American Institute in Taiwan (AIT), European Economic and Trade Office, and John Dennis of British Office Taipei, as well as the Indian, Japanese and Singaporean governments, offered their condolences. According to Taiwan's foreign ministry, more than 600 foreign representatives from 80 countries and international organizations have sent condolences, including all 15 of Taiwan's diplomatic allies. On 24 April, a bench at the AIT's Taipei Main Office was named "Fulbright Bench" by Director Brent Christensen in honor of the two Fulbright Program English Teaching Assistants (ETAs) who perished in the train derailment.

The Dalai Lama sent a letter to the Presidential Office and is "deeply saddened" by the incident.

On the first anniversary of the incident in 2022, trains nationwide in Taiwan blew their horns for 30 seconds at 09:28 NST (01:28 UTC) in commemoration at exact time of the derailment.

On 31 August 2023, relatives of people who died in the derailment were invited to inspect the train cars involved. In the ensuing week, several bone fragments were discovered, prompting an apology from transportation minister Wang Kwo-tsai and Taiwan Railway Administration director-general Tu Wei.

On the third anniversary of the derailment, a memorial concert and light show was held at Taipei Main Station.

== See also ==
- 1991 Miaoli train collision
- 2001 Selby rail crash
- 2015 Oxnard train derailment
- 2018 Yilan train derailment
- 2023 Taichung crane collapse
- List of rail accidents (2020–present)
