= Xinguanyin Tunnel =

Xinguanyin Tunnel 新觀音隧道
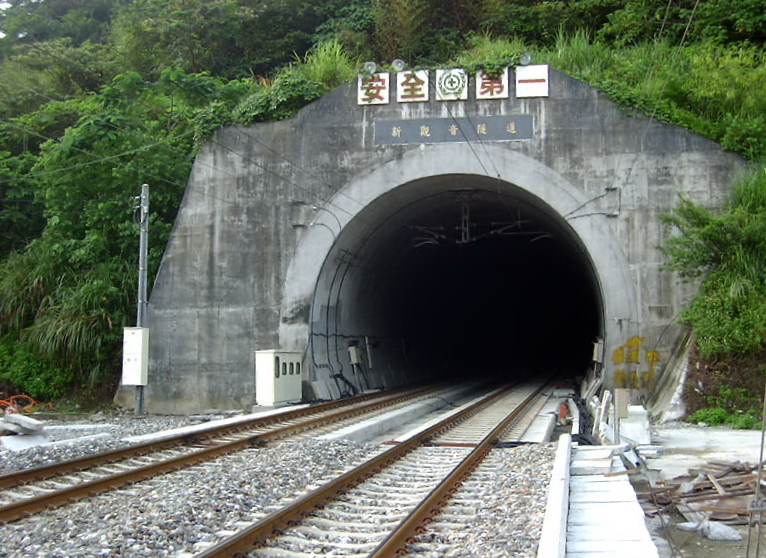
- Xinguanyin Tunnel North Exit
- Interactive map of Xinguanyin Tunnel 新觀音隧道

Overview
- Line: North-link Line
- Location: Nan'ao, Yilan County
- Coordinates: 24.41°N 121.787°E
- Status: in use
- System: Taiwan Railways
- Crosses: Central Mountain Range
- Start: Wuta Station south
- End: Hanben Station north

Operation
- Opened: 2003
- Operator: Taiwan Railways Administration
- Traffic: rail

Technical
- Length: 10,307.1 m (33,816 ft)
- Track gauge: 1,067 mm (3 ft 6 in)
- Electrified: AC 25 kV, 60 Hz
- Operating speed: 130 km/h

Xinguanyin Tunnel (Chinese: 新觀音隧道) is located in Taiwan Railway North-link Line, Nan'ao, Yilan County territory. It runs through the Central Mountain Range, and with a total length of 10,307.1 meters, it is the longest mountain railway tunnel in Taiwan.

This tunnel is a one-way section for up to 13.2 km in order to improve the Wuta - Hanben Chisel tunnel. Beigou is located in the south of Wuta station, south of Nanxi South River, south of Hanzhong station north, across the board two-track electrification. As the tunnel is very long, the construction unit in order to save construction time, in addition to excavation on both sides of the north and south, and in the middle of the North vertical pit and South Hang Hang, so all a total of 6 working surface to enhance the construction efficiency. The tunnel was launched in August 2001 and was commissioned in 2003. The track in the tunnel adopts the ballast layout track, which allows the train to pass at a speed of 130 km / h at high speed. After completion, it will greatly enhance the driving efficiency of the north route.

Parallel with the New Guanyin tunnel Guanyin tunnel, Guyin tunnel, Gufeng tunnel and Guanyin signal station, have been abandoned, Reserved for the Yilan County government as Suhua Highway relief with the sidewalk, and later because of Suhua change engineering needs and become a dedicated contact.
