= Nan'ao railway station =

Railway Station Of Taiwan Railways Administration

Nan'ao Station 南澳車站
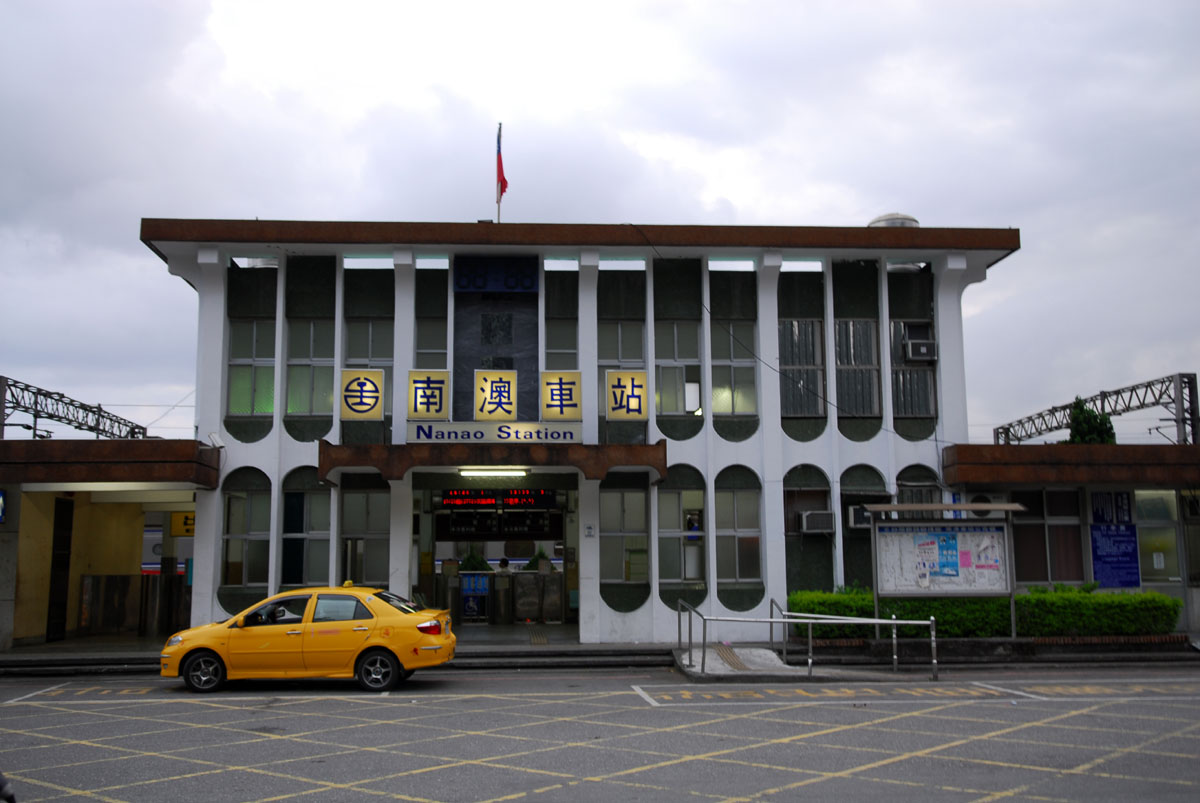

General information
- Location: Su'ao, Yilan County, Taiwan
- Coordinates: 24°27′47.82″N 121°48′5.10″E
- System: Railway station
- Owner: Taiwan Railway Corporation
- Operator: Taiwan Railway Corporation
- Line: North-link
- Train operators: Taiwan Railway Corporation

History
- Opened: 1 February 1980

Passengers
- 1,463 daily (2024)

Services
Preceding station	Taiwan Railway	Following station
Dong'ao towards Badu	Eastern Trunk line	Wuta towards Taitung
Location

The Nan'ao Station (Chinese: 南澳車站; pinyin: Nán'ào Chēzhàn) is a railway station of Taiwan Railway North-link line located at Su'ao Township, Yilan County, Taiwan.

== History ==
The station was opened on 1 February 1980.

== See also ==
- List of railway stations in Taiwan
