= Heping railway station (Taiwan) =

Railway station in Hualien County, Taiwan

Heping Station 和平車站
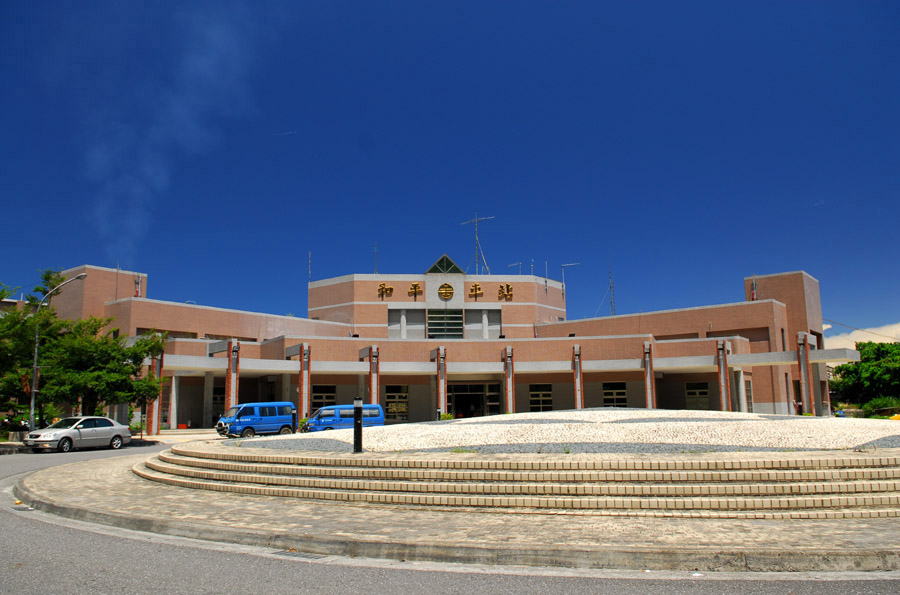

General information
- Location: Xiulin, Hualien County, Taiwan
- Coordinates: 24°17′55.7″N 121°45′17.2″E
- System: Railway station
- Owner: Taiwan Railway Corporation
- Operator: Taiwan Railway Corporation
- Line: North-link
- Train operators: Taiwan Railway Corporation

History
- Opened: 8 February 1979

Passengers
- 1,433 daily (2024)

Services
| Preceding station | Taiwan Railway | Following station |
|---|---|---|
| Hanben towards Badu | Eastern Trunk line | Heren towards Taitung |
Location

Heping Station (Chinese: 和平車站; pinyin: Hépíng Chēzhàn) is a railway station on the Taiwan Railway North-link line located in Xiulin Township, Hualien County, Taiwan.

== History ==
The station was opened on 8 February 1979.

== Around the station ==
- Hoping Power Plant

== See also ==
- List of railway stations in Taiwan
