= Dong'ao railway station =

Railway station in Nan'ao, Yilan County, Taiwan

Dong'ao Station 東澳車站
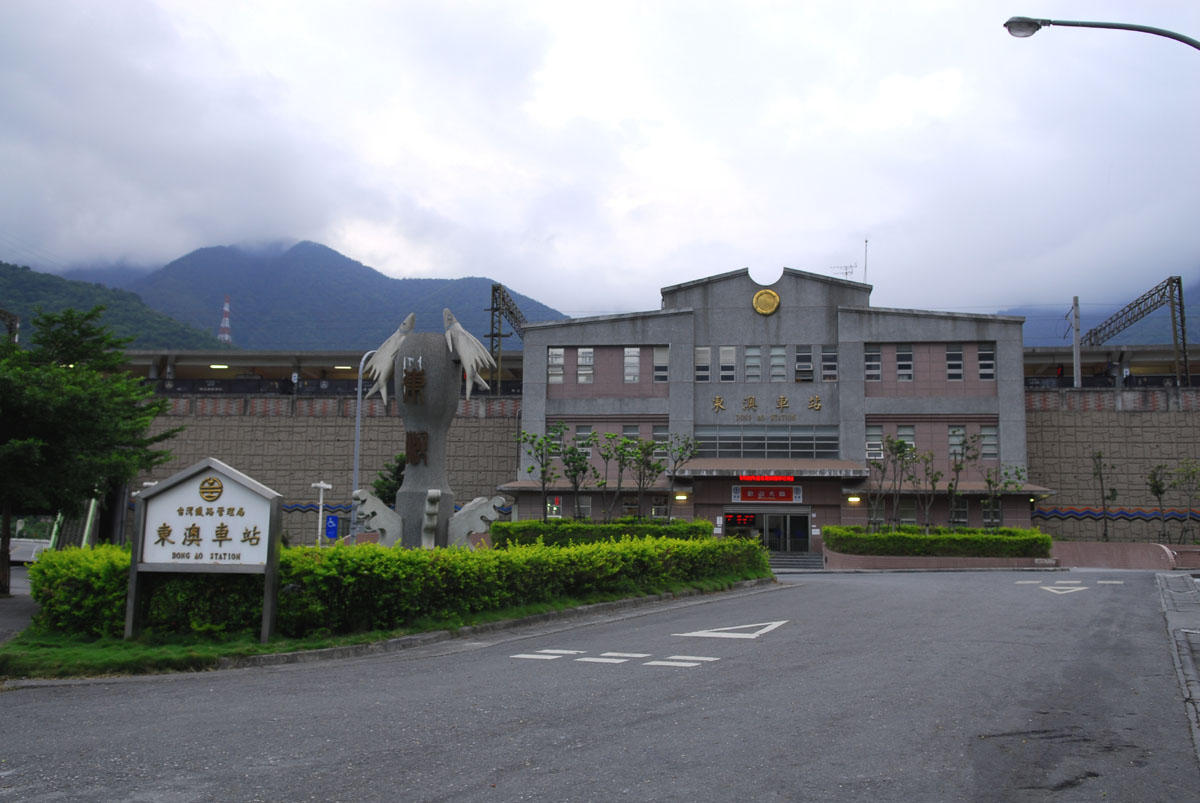

General information
- Location: Nan'ao, Yilan County, Taiwan
- Coordinates: 24°31′6.06″N 121°49′50.88″E
- System: Railway station
- Owner: Taiwan Railway Corporation
- Operator: Taiwan Railway Corporation
- Line: North-link
- Train operators: Taiwan Railway Corporation

History
- Opened: 1 February 1980

Passengers
- 349 daily (2024)

Services
Preceding station	Taiwan Railway	Following station
Yongle towards Badu	Eastern Trunk line	Nan'ao towards Taitung
Location

The Dong'ao Station (Chinese: 東澳車站; pinyin: Dōng'ào Chēzhàn) is a railway station of Taiwan Railway North-link line located at Nan'ao Township, Yilan County, Taiwan.

== History ==
The station was opened on 1 February 1980.

== See also ==
- List of railway stations in Taiwan
