= Chongde railway station =

Railway station in Xiulin, Hualien County, Taiwan

Chongde Station 崇德車站
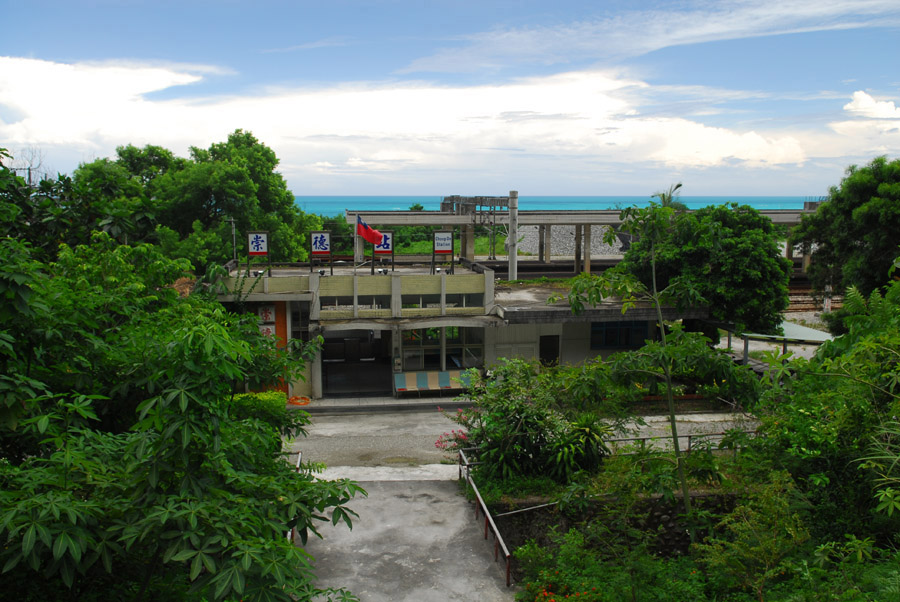

General information
- Location: Xiulin, Hualien County, Taiwan
- Coordinates: 24°10′19.7″N 121°39′19.6″E
- System: Railway station
- Owner: Taiwan Railway
- Operator: Taiwan Railway
- Line: North-link
- Train operators: Taiwan Railway

History
- Opened: 8 February 1979

Passengers
- 32 daily (2024)

Services
Preceding station	Taiwan Railway	Following station
Heren towards Badu	Eastern Trunk line	Xincheng towards Taitung
Location

Chongde (Chinese: 崇德車站; pinyin: Chóngdé Chēzhàn) is a railway station on Taiwan Railway (TR) North-link line located in Xiulin Township, Hualien County, Taiwan.

== History ==
The station was opened on 8 February 1979.

On 2 April 2021, at least 50 people died in a train crash near the station.

== See also ==
- List of railway stations in Taiwan
