= Hanben railway station =

Railway station in Yilan County, Taiwan

Hanben Station 漢本車站
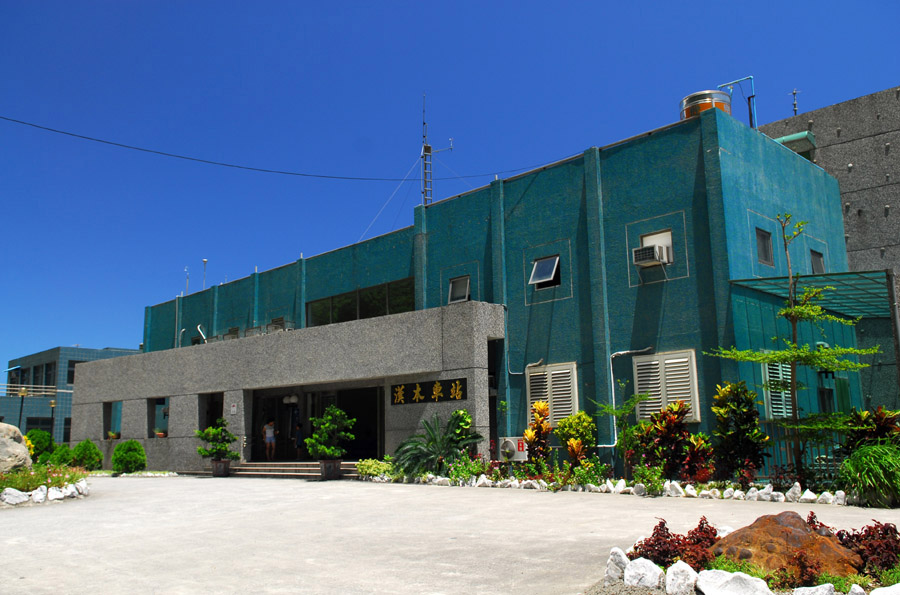

General information
- Location: Nan'ao, Yilan County, Taiwan
- Coordinates: 24°20′7.5″N 121°46′5.8″E
- System: Railway station
- Owner: Taiwan Railway Corporation
- Operator: Taiwan Railway Corporation
- Line: North-link
- Train operators: Taiwan Railway Corporation

History
- Opened: 1 February 1980

Passengers
- 17 daily (2024)

Services
Preceding station	Taiwan Railway	Following station
Wuta towards Badu	Eastern Trunk line	Heping towards Taitung
Location

Hanben Station (Chinese: 漢本車站; pinyin: Hànběn Chēzhàn) is a railway station on the Taiwan Railway North-link line located in Nan'ao Township, Yilan County, Taiwan.

== History ==
The station was opened on 1 February 1980.

== See also ==
- List of railway stations in Taiwan
