= Yongle railway station (Taiwan) =

Railway station in Su'ao, Yilan, Taiwan

Yongle 永樂車站
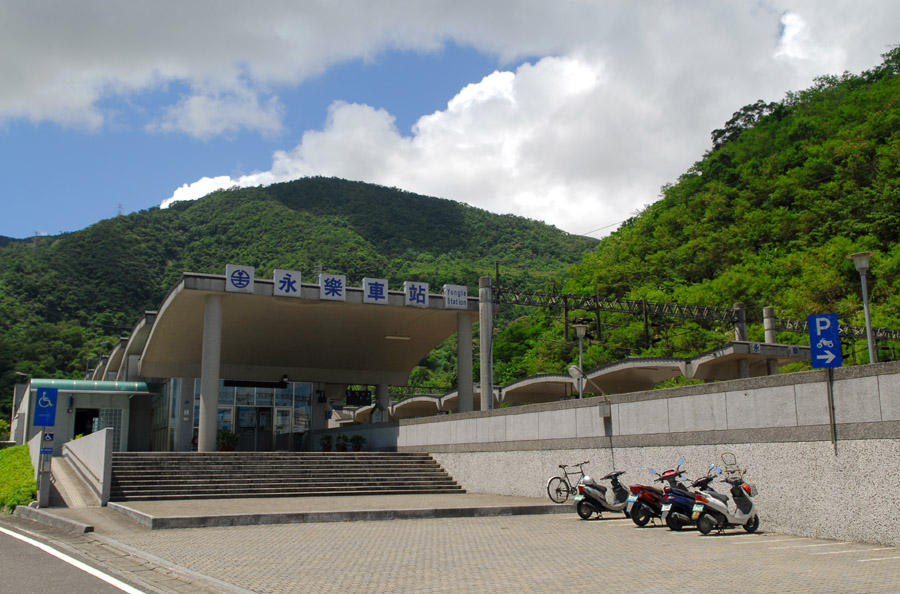

General information
- Location: Su'ao, Yilan County, Taiwan
- Coordinates: 24°34′6.90″N 121°50′40.98″E
- System: Railway station
- Owner: Taiwan Railway Corporation
- Operator: Taiwan Railway Corporation
- Line: North-link
- Train operators: Taiwan Railway Corporation

History
- Opened: 1 February 1980

Passengers
- 25 daily (2024)

Services
Preceding station	Taiwan Railway	Following station
Su'aoxin towards Badu	Eastern Trunk line	Dong'ao towards Taitung
Location

The Yongle (Chinese: 永樂車站; pinyin: Yǒnglè Chēzhàn) is a railway station of Taiwan Railway North-link line located at Su'ao Township, Yilan County, Taiwan.

== History ==
The station was opened on 1 February 1980.

== See also ==
- List of railway stations in Taiwan
