= Heren railway station =

Railway station in Hualien County, Taiwan

Heren Station 和仁車站
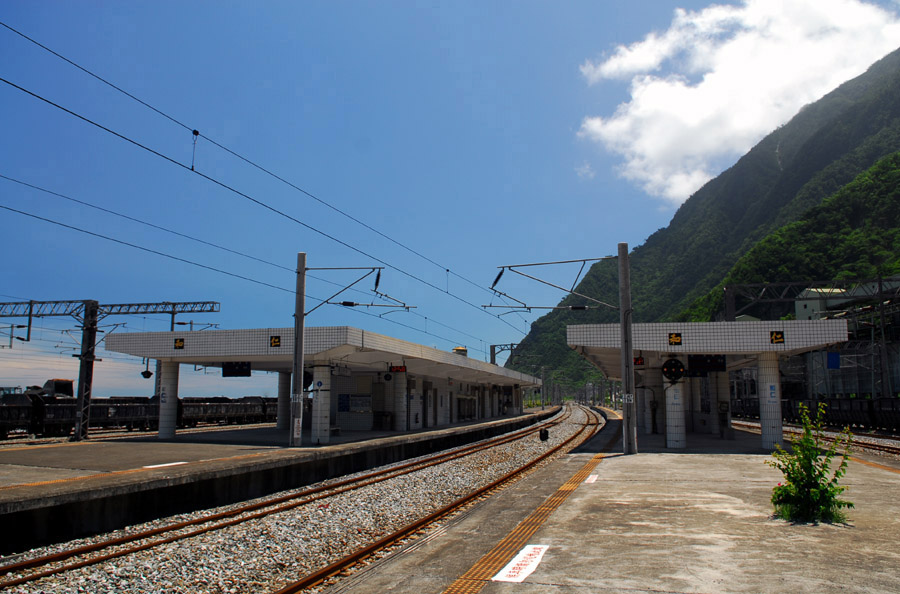

General information
- Location: Xiulin, Hualien County, Taiwan
- Coordinates: 24°14′35.7″N 121°42′43.7″E
- System: Railway station
- Owner: Taiwan Railway Corporation
- Operator: Taiwan Railway Corporation
- Line: North-link
- Train operators: Taiwan Railway Corporation

History
- Opened: 8 February 1979

Passengers
- 111 daily (2024)

Services
Preceding station	Taiwan Railway	Following station
Heping towards Badu	Eastern Trunk line	Chongde towards Taitung
Location

Heren (Chinese: 和仁車站; pinyin: Hérén Chēzhàn) is a railway station on the Taiwan Railway North-link line located in Xiulin Township, Hualien County, Taiwan.

== History ==
The station was opened on 8 February 1979.

== Around the station ==
- Qingshui Cliff
