= Wuta =

Wuta may refer to

- Wuta Dombaxe (born 1986), Angolan handball player
- Wuta Mayi, recording artist, composer and vocalist from the Democratic Republic of the Congo
- Wuta Station, a railway station on the Taiwan Railway Administration
- WUTA, original designation of WMLU, a non-commercial, educational radio station licensed to Farmville, Virginia
