= Yongle (disambiguation) =

The Yongle Emperor (1360–1424) was the third emperor of the Chinese Ming dynasty.

Yongle may also refer to:

- Yongle Encyclopedia, a 1403 Chinese leishu
- Yongle railway station (Beijing), a station on the Beijing–Tianjin intercity railway
- Yongle railway station (Taiwan), a TRA station in Yilan County, Taiwan
- Yongle (346–353), era name used by Zhang Chonghua during the Sixteen Kingdoms period

== Towns in China ==
- Yongle, Chongqing, in Fengjie County, Chongqing
- Yongle, Heilongjiang, in Zhaozhou County, Heilongjiang
- Yongle, Binzhou, in Binzhou, Shaanxi
- Yongle, Jingyang County, in Jingyang County, Shaanxi
- Yongle, Zhenba County, in Zhenba County, Shaanxi
- Yongle, Ruicheng County, in Ruicheng County, Shanxi
- Yongle, Jiuzhaigou County, in Jiuzhaigou County, Sichuan

== Townships in China ==
- Yongle Township, Baise, a township of Guangxi
- Yongle Township, Rongshui County, in Rongshui Miao Autonomous County, Guangxi
- Yongle Township, Guiyang, a township of Guizhou
- Yongle Township, Shanxi, in Gu County, Shanxi
- Yongle Township, Sichuan, a township of Sichuan

== Subdistricts in China ==
- Yongle Subdistrict, Anshan, in Tiexi District, Anshan, Liaoning
- Yongle Subdistrict, Shenyang, in Sujiatun District, Shenyang, Liaoning
- Yongle Subdistrict, Zhen'an County, in Zhen'an County, Shaanxi
