= Su'aoxin railway station =

Railway station in Su'ao, Taiwan

Su'aoxin 蘇澳新站
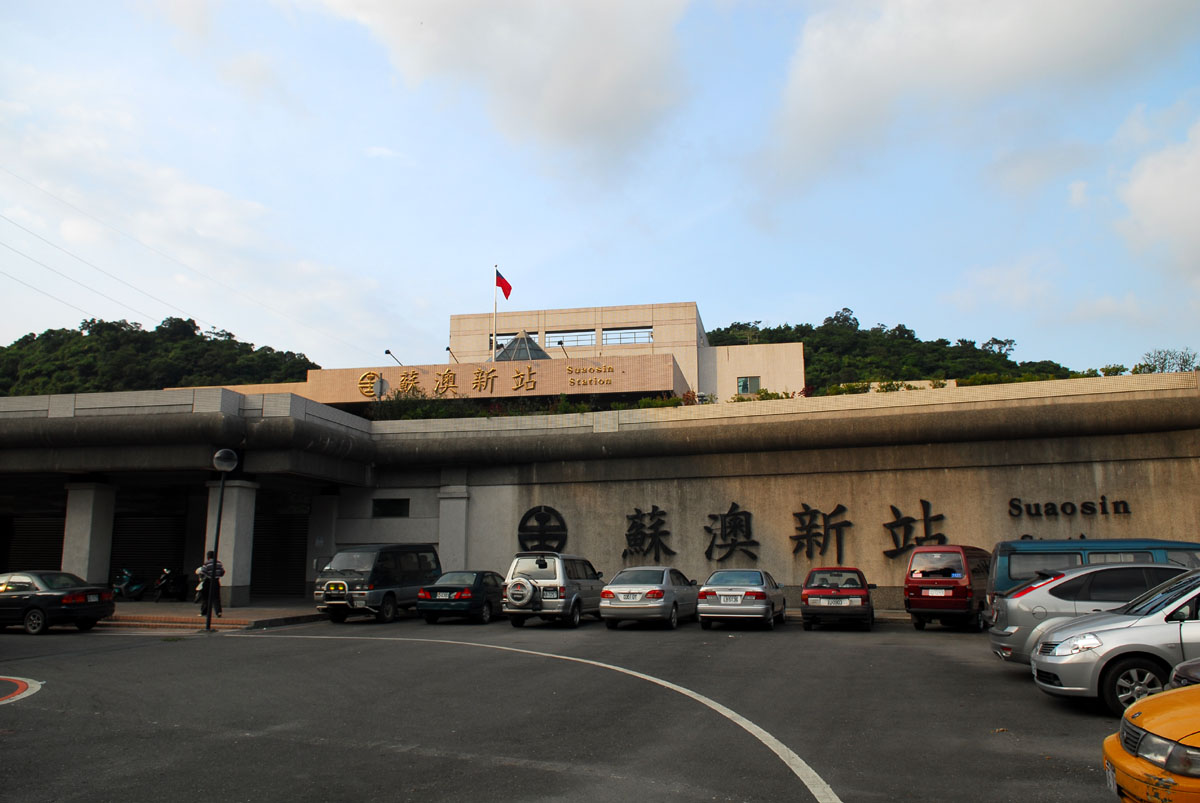

General information
- Location: Su'ao, Yilan County, Taiwan
- Coordinates: 24°36′30.96″N 121°49′38.94″E
- System: Train station
- Owner: Taiwan Railway Corporation
- Operator: Taiwan Railway Corporation
- Line: Eastern Trunk line
- Platforms: Island
- Train operators: Taiwan Railway Corporation

History
- Opened: 15 April 1968

Passengers
- 1,414 daily (2024)

Services
Preceding station	Taiwan Railway	Following station
Xinma towards Badu	Eastern Trunk line	Yongle towards Taitung
Terminus	Eastern Trunk line Su'ao branch	Su'ao Terminus
Location

Su-aoxin Station or Su-ao New (Chinese: 蘇澳新站; pinyin: Sū'ào Xīnzhàn) is a railway station on the Taiwan Railway Yilan line located in Su'ao Township, Yilan County, Taiwan. It is an intersegmental station of Yilan line continued to Su'ao and the northern terminus of North-link line. The station was opened on 15 April 1968.

Outline map of the stations near Su'ao

There are two island platforms and multiple tracks.

== See also ==
- List of railway stations in Taiwan
