= Taroko Express =

Passenger train service in Taiwan

TEMU1000 series "Taroko Express"
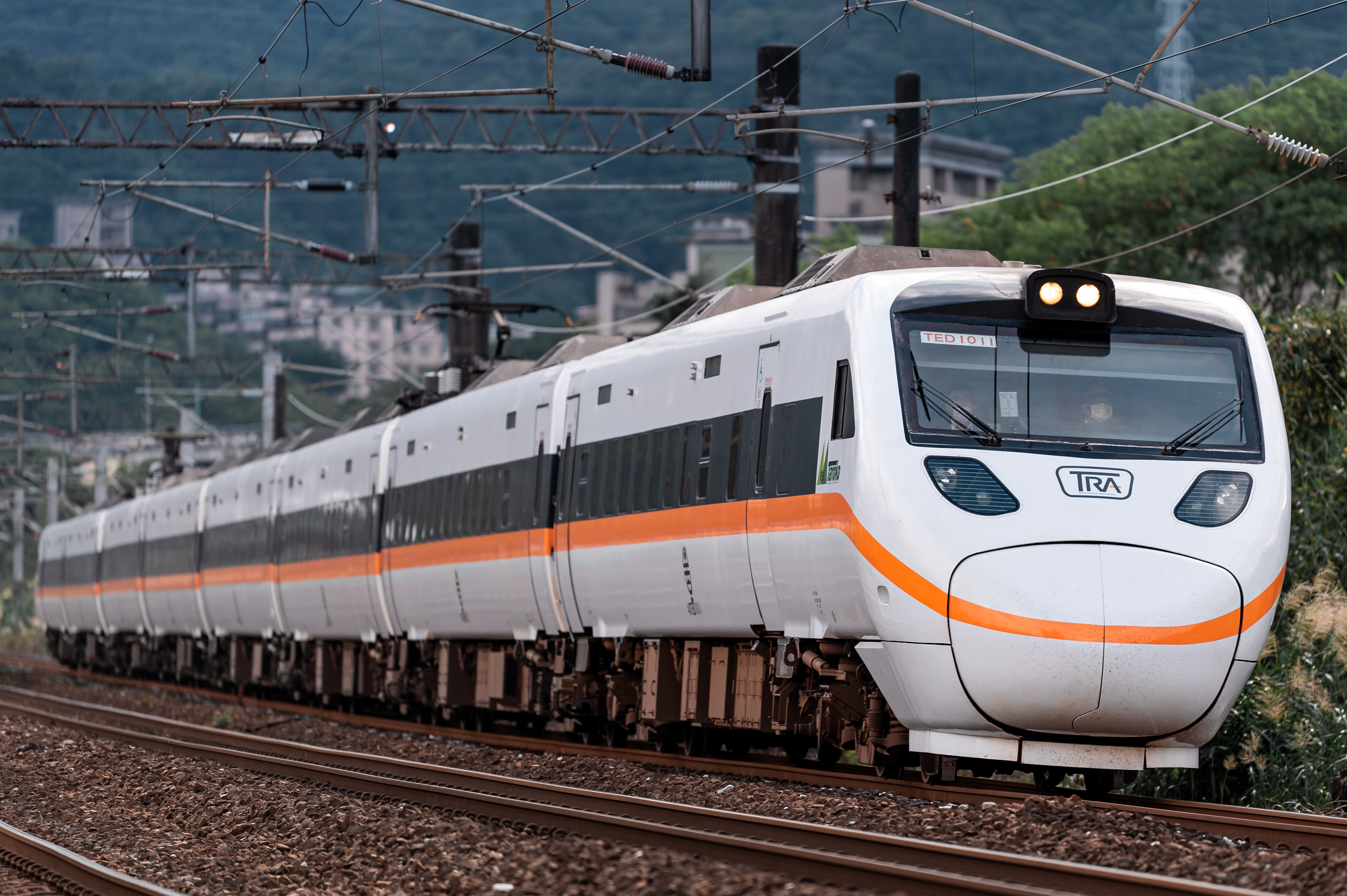
- Taroko Express set 6 (TEMU1011/1012) running between Baifu and Wudu
- In service: 2007–present
- Manufacturer: Hitachi Rail
- Family name: AT300 (rolling stock); Tze-chiang limited express (service)
- Constructed: 2006–2007, 2014–2015
- Number built: 65 vehicles (8 sets + 1 car)
- Number in service: 56 vehicles (7 sets)
- Number retired: 1 set (TEMU1013/1014)
- Number scrapped: 1 car (TED1010)
- Formation: 8 cars per trainset
- Fleet numbers: TEMU1001–TEMU1016
- Operator: Taiwan Railway Corporation

Specifications
- Car body construction: Aluminium
- Train length: 166.99 m (547 ft 10 in)
- Car length: 21,995 mm (72 ft 1.9 in) (TED); 20.5 m (67 ft 3 in) (others)
- Width: 2.91 m (9 ft 7 in)
- Height: 4.3 m (14 ft 1 in) (TEP); 4.03 m (13 ft 3 in) (others)
- Doors: 4 per car, 2 more for drivers
- Maximum speed: 150 km/h (93 mph) (design); 130 km/h (81 mph) (service)
- Traction system: Hitachi CII-HR1420A IGBT–C/I
- Traction motors: 16 × Hitachi HS32529-06RB 190 kW (255 hp) asynchronous 3-phase AC
- Power output: 3.04 MW (4,077 hp)
- Electric system: 25 kV 60 Hz AC (nominal) from overhead catenary
- Current collection: Pantograph
- UIC classification: 2′2′+Bo′Bo′+2′2′+Bo′Bo′+Bo′Bo′+2′2′+Bo′Bo′+2′2′
- Track gauge: 1,067 mm (3 ft 6 in)

The Taroko Express (Chinese: 太魯閣號; pinyin: Tàilǔgé Hào) is an express train service of Taiwan Railway Corporation, and is part of Tze-Chiang Limited Express. The name of the service comes from the 19-kilometre (12-mile) long Taroko Gorge, which is one of Taiwan's most popular tourist spots, and the Truku people. It began commercial operations on 16 February 2007.

The Taroko Express uses the tilting electrical multiple unit series known as TEMU1000 based on the JR Kyushu 885 series. They were imported to Taiwan in 2006; since 2007, they have been running between Hualien and Taipei City, on the curved Yilan line at the existing narrow gauge tracks, where they reduced traveling time between the two places from previously 3 hours down to about 2 hours. Some trains also continue from Taipei to Tianzhong. Its maximum operational speed is 130 kilometres per hour (81 mph).

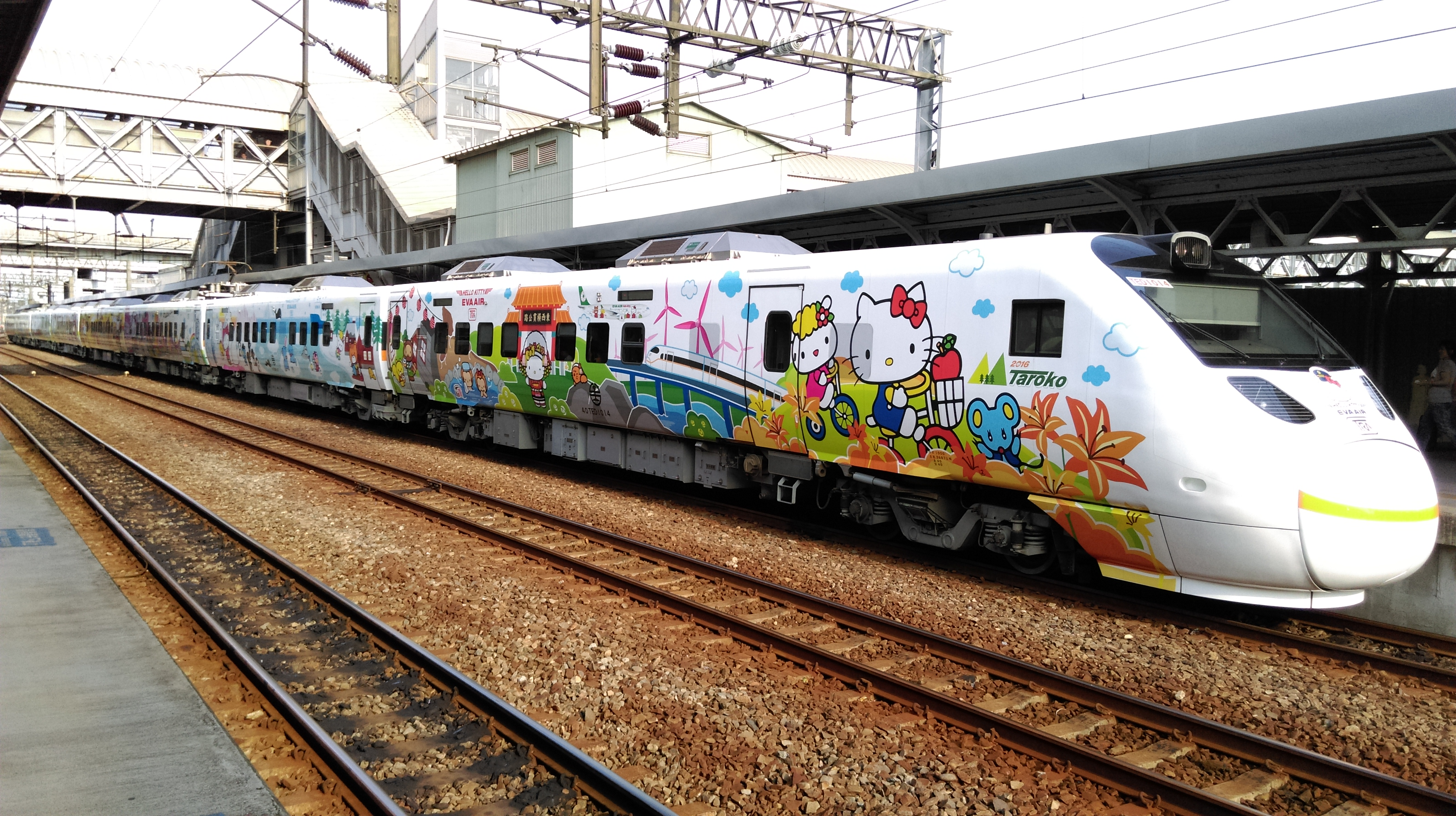
Taroko Express set 7 in Hello Kitty livery at Kaohsiung in 2016. After the livery was removed, this trainset would later derail, killing 49.

On 2 April 2021, a Taroko Express train derailed in Hualien County, killing 49 people with many others injured.

== See also ==
- Rail transport in Taiwan
- Puyuma Express
