= Nan'ao, Yilan =

Mountain indigenous township in Yilan County, Taiwan

Coordinates: 24°28′N 121°48′E

Nan'ao Township 南澳鄕
- Mountain indigenous township
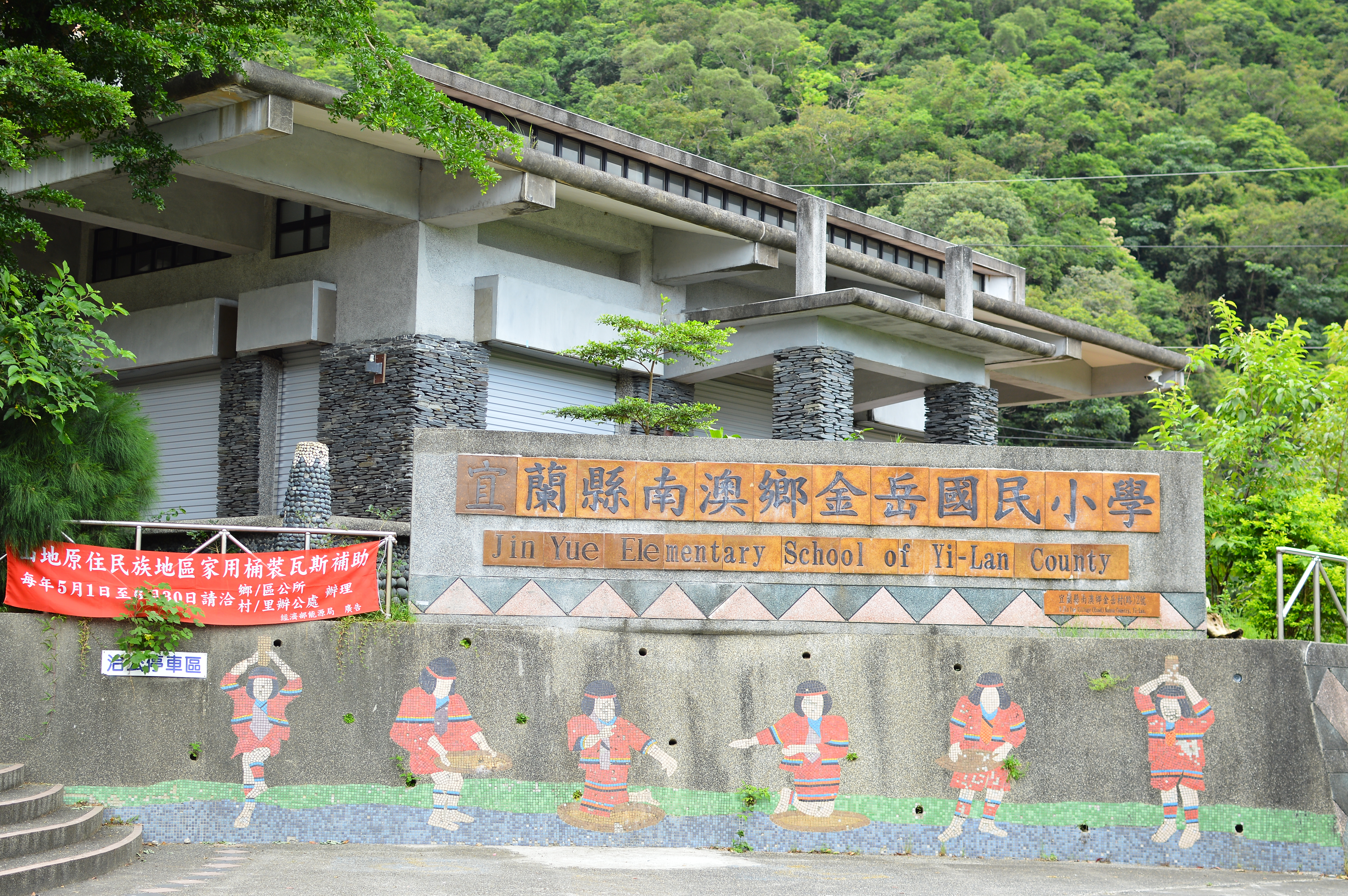
- A school in Jinyue Village, Nan'ao Township

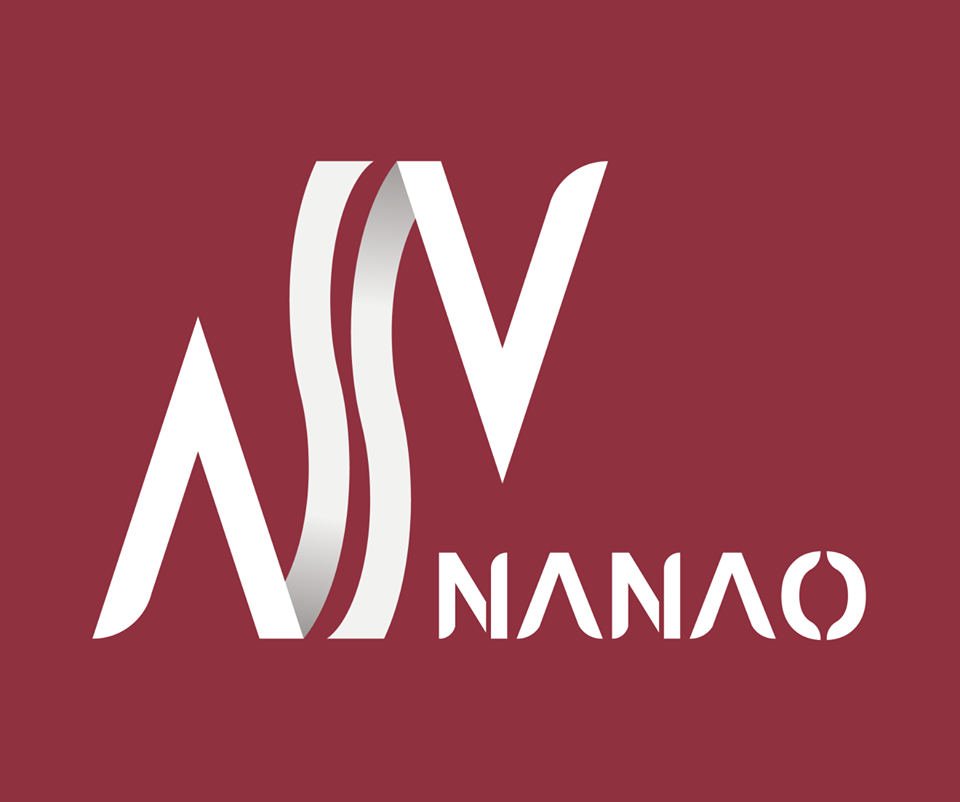
- Seal

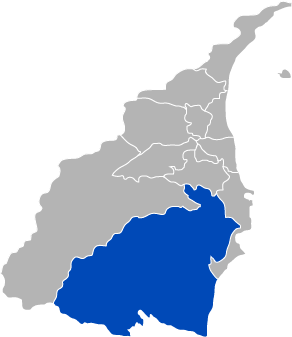
- Nan'ao Township in Yilan County
- Location: Yilan County, Taiwan

Area
  - Total: 740.65 km^{2} (285.97 sq mi)

Population (September 2023)
  - Total: 6,110
  - Density: 8.25/km^{2} (21.4/sq mi)
- Website: www.nanao.e-land.gov.tw (in Chinese)

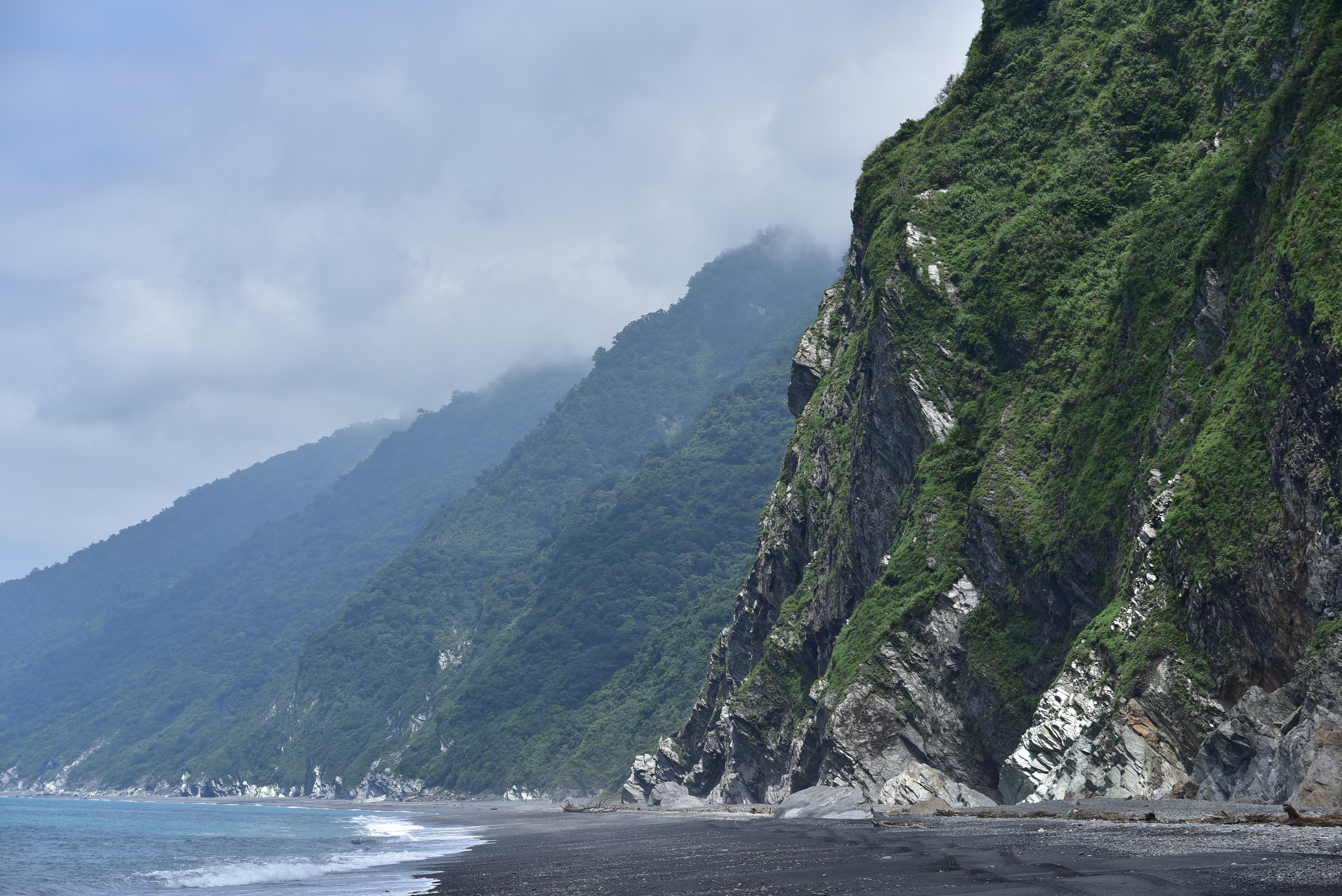
The coastline in Nan'ao Township

Nan'ao Township (Chinese: 南澳鄕; pinyin: Nán'ào Xiāng) is a mountain indigenous township in the southern part of Yilan County, Taiwan. It is the largest township in the county.

== History ==
The township was formerly the "Aboriginal Area" of Suō District, Taihoku Prefecture, during Japanese rule. It was the site of the Sayun incident made famous through the movie Sayon's Bell.

== Geography ==
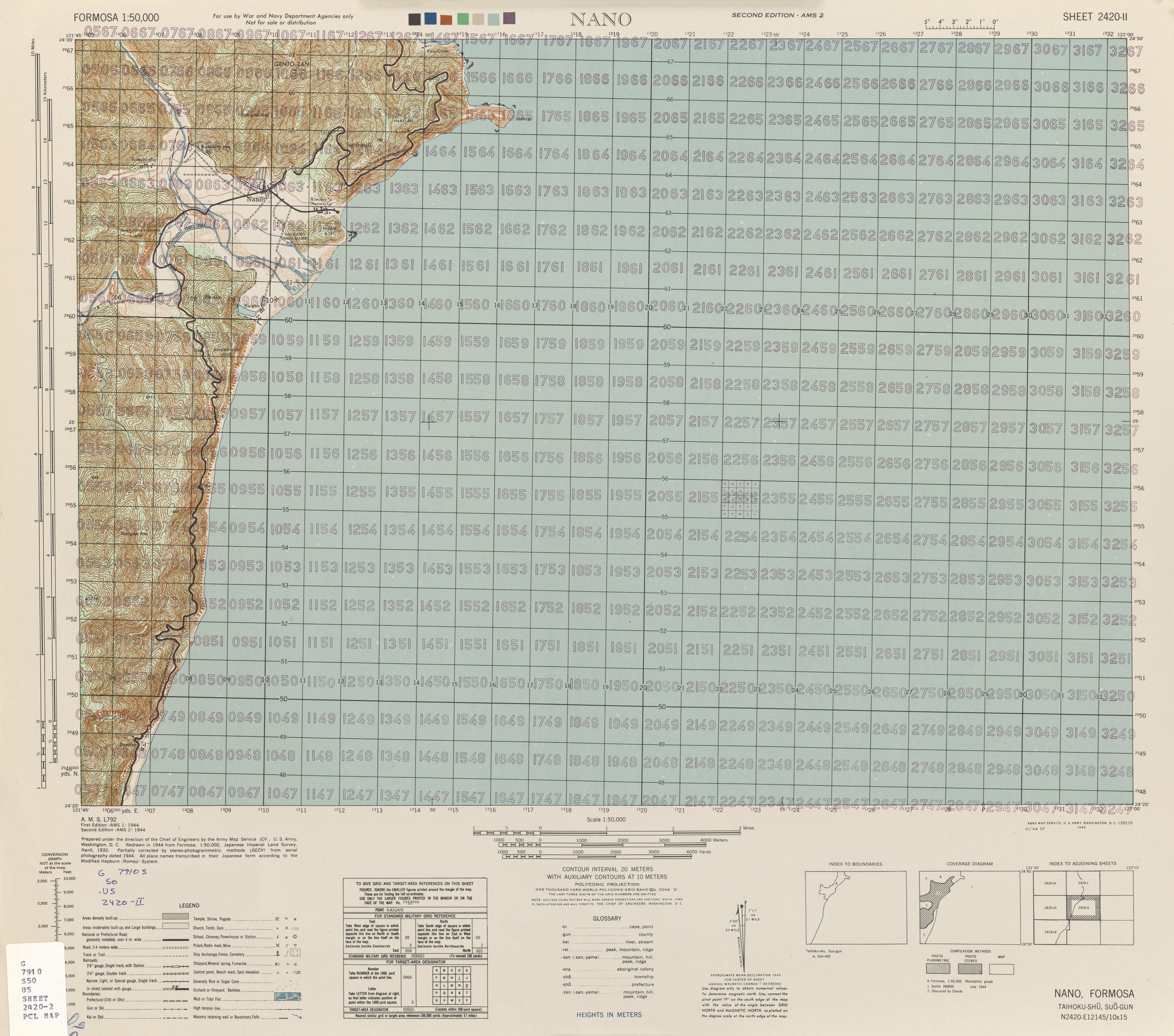
Map of Nan'ao (labeled Nanō) (1944)

The population consists mainly of the indigenous Atayal people. Many residents of Aohua Village still speak the Japanese language in daily life.

Nan'ao Township contains part of the mountainous terrain of the Central Mountain Range.

- Area: 740.65 km^{2}
- Population: 6,110 people in 2,092 households (September 2023)

== Administrative divisions ==
Nanao is divided into seven villages (from north to south):

- Dongyue
- Nan'ao
- Biho
- Jinyue
- Wuta
- Jinyang
- Aohua

== Tourist attractions ==
- Cueifong Lake

== Transportation ==
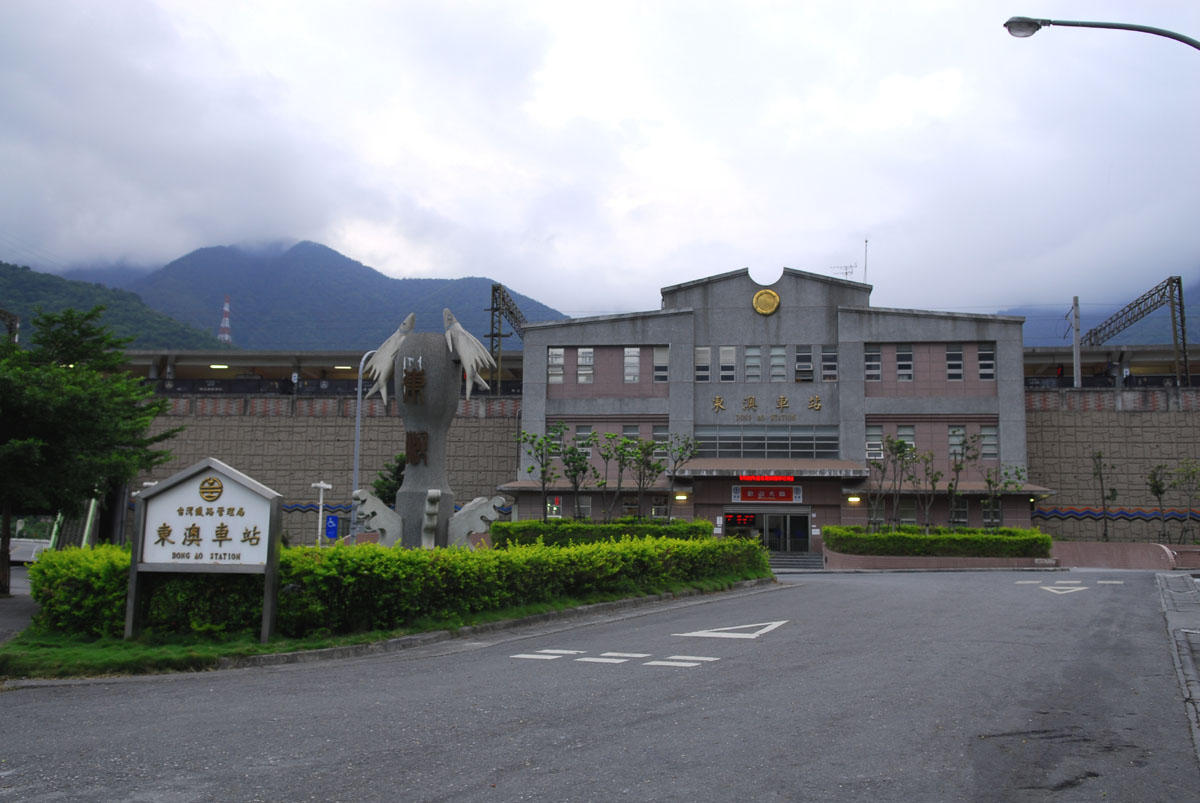
Dong'ao Rail Station

Nan'ao is served by the North-Link Line of Taiwan Railway at three stations: Dong'ao Station, Hanben Station, and Wuta Station.

Taiwan Highway 9 passes through Nan'ao. Between Su'ao and Hualien City, to the south, this road is known as the Suhua Highway (蘇花公路), and it features some of the most dramatic oceanside scenery in Taiwan.

== Notable natives ==
- Laha Mebow, writer, producer and director
