= North-link line =

Railway line in Taiwan

North-Link line
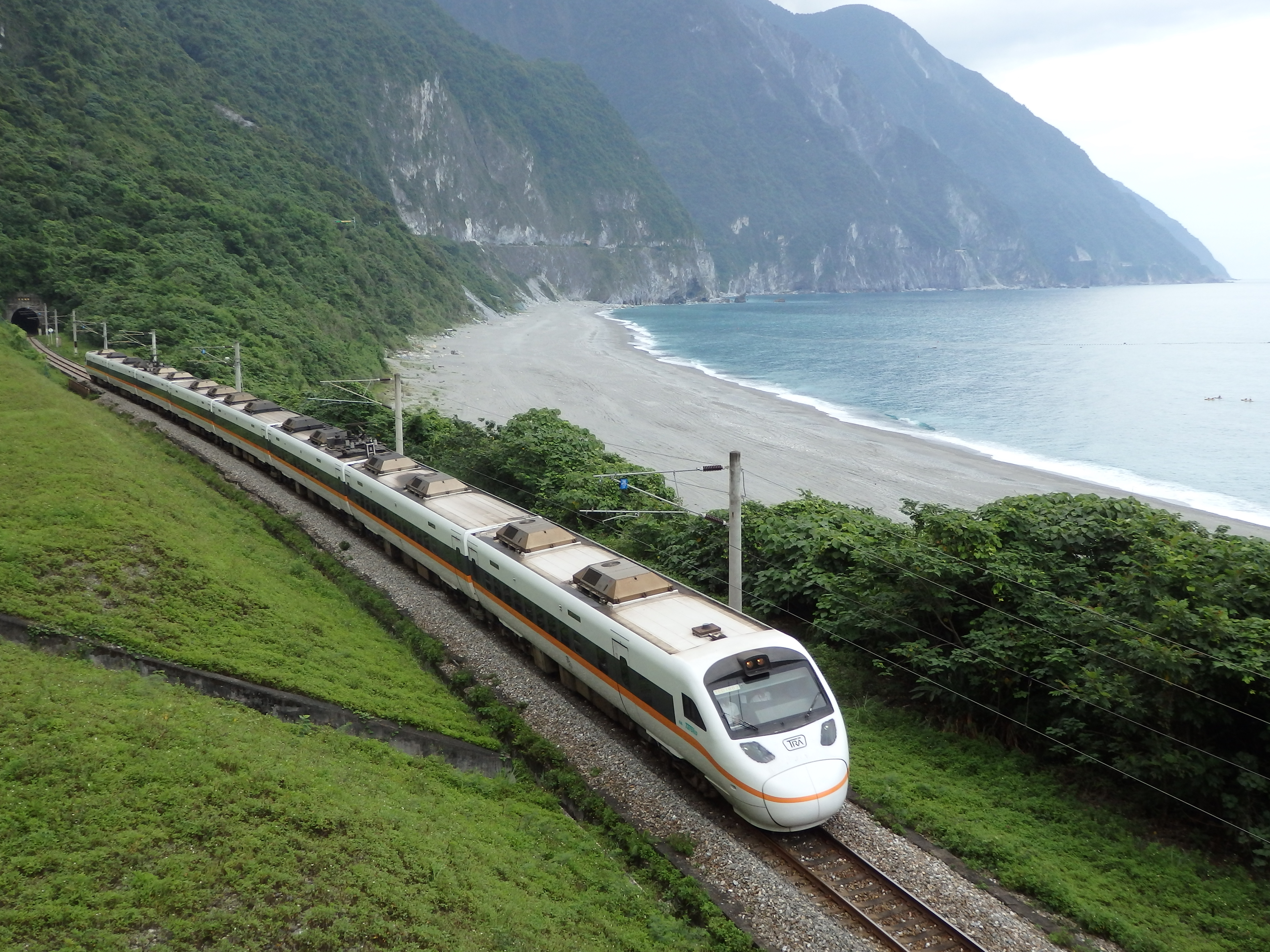
- Taroko Express at Heren–Chongde section (shot on June 18, 2019)

Overview
- Native name: 北迴線
- Owner: Taiwan Railway Corporation
- Termini: Su'aoxin; Hualien
- Stations: 13

Service
- Type: Passenger/freight rail
- System: Taiwan Railway
- Operator: Taiwan Railway Corporation

History
- Opened: 1 February 1980

Technical
- Line length: 79.2 km (49.2 mi)
- Number of tracks: 2
- Track gauge: 3 ft 6 in (1,067 mm)
- Electrification: 25 kV/60 Hz Catenary
- Operating speed: 150 km/h (93 mph)

The North-Link line (Chinese: 北迴線; pinyin: Běihuí Xiàn) is the central section of the Eastern Line of Taiwan Railway. The length of its mainline is 79.2 km (49.2 mi), and there is a 7.4 km (4.6 mi) long branch between Beipu and Hualien Port.

== History ==
The high mountains and cliffs in eastern Taiwan, between Yilan and Hualien, are a major barrier to the transportation between northern Taiwan and eastern Taiwan. The highway was narrow and dangerous. Ferry service between Keelung and Hualien was an overnight trip. Thus in 1973 the construction of the North-Link Line started. The line branched from Yilan line at Nan Sheng Hu in Su'ao, traveling through mountains and valleys with 91 tunnels and 16 bridges, and ended at a newly constructed Hualien Station. The line was completed in 1979 and was almost immediately overloaded with passenger and freight services. Although Taiwan Railways Administration continuously upgraded signals, tracks, and rolling stock of the line, the great demand could not be fulfilled. The line was then electrified in 2003 and expanded to two tracks (double track) in January 2005.

== Stations ==
Outline map near Su'ao

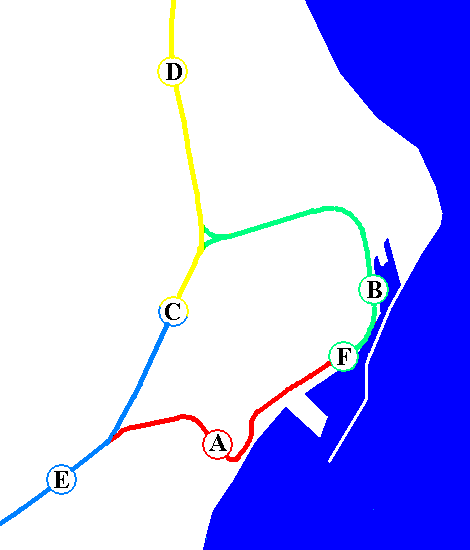
Outline map near Hualien ・Stations: A: Hualien (former), B: Hualien Port, C: Hualien, D: Beipu, E: Ji'an, F: Meilun ・Lines: Yellow: North-Link line Blue: Hualien–Taitung line Green: Hualien Port line Red: Hualien Port line (former)

Name	Chinese	Taiwanese	Hakka	Transfers and notes	Location	
Su'aoxin	蘇澳新	So͘-ò Sin	Sû-o Sîn	→ Yilan line	Su'ao	Yilan; County
Yongle	永樂	Éng-lo̍k	Yún-lo̍k		Su'ao	Yilan; County
Dong'ao	東澳	Tang-ò	Tûng-o		Nan'ao	Yilan; County
Nan'ao	南澳	Lâm-ò	Nàm-o		Su'ao	Yilan; County
Wuta	武塔	Bú-thah	Vú-thap		Nan'ao	Yilan; County
Hanben	漢本	Hàn-pún	Hon-pún		Nan'ao	Yilan; County
Heping	和平	Hô-pêng	Fò-phìn		Xiulin	Hualien; County
Heren	和仁	Hô-jîn	Fò-yìn		Xiulin	Hualien; County
Chongde	崇德	Chông-tek	Chhùng-tet		Xiulin	Hualien; County
Xincheng (Taroko)	新城（太魯閣）	Sin-siâⁿ (Thài-ló͘-koh)	Sîn-sàng (Thai-lû-kok)		Xincheng	Hualien; County
Jingmei	景美	Kéng-bí	Kín-mî		Xiulin	Hualien; County
Beipu	北埔	Pak-po͘	Pet-phû		Xincheng	Hualien; County
Hualien	花蓮	Hoa-liân	Fâ-lièn	→ Hualien–Taitung line	Hualien	Hualien; County

- Yongchun Station: Located between Su'aoxin and Yongle. Merged by Yongle Station in 2002.

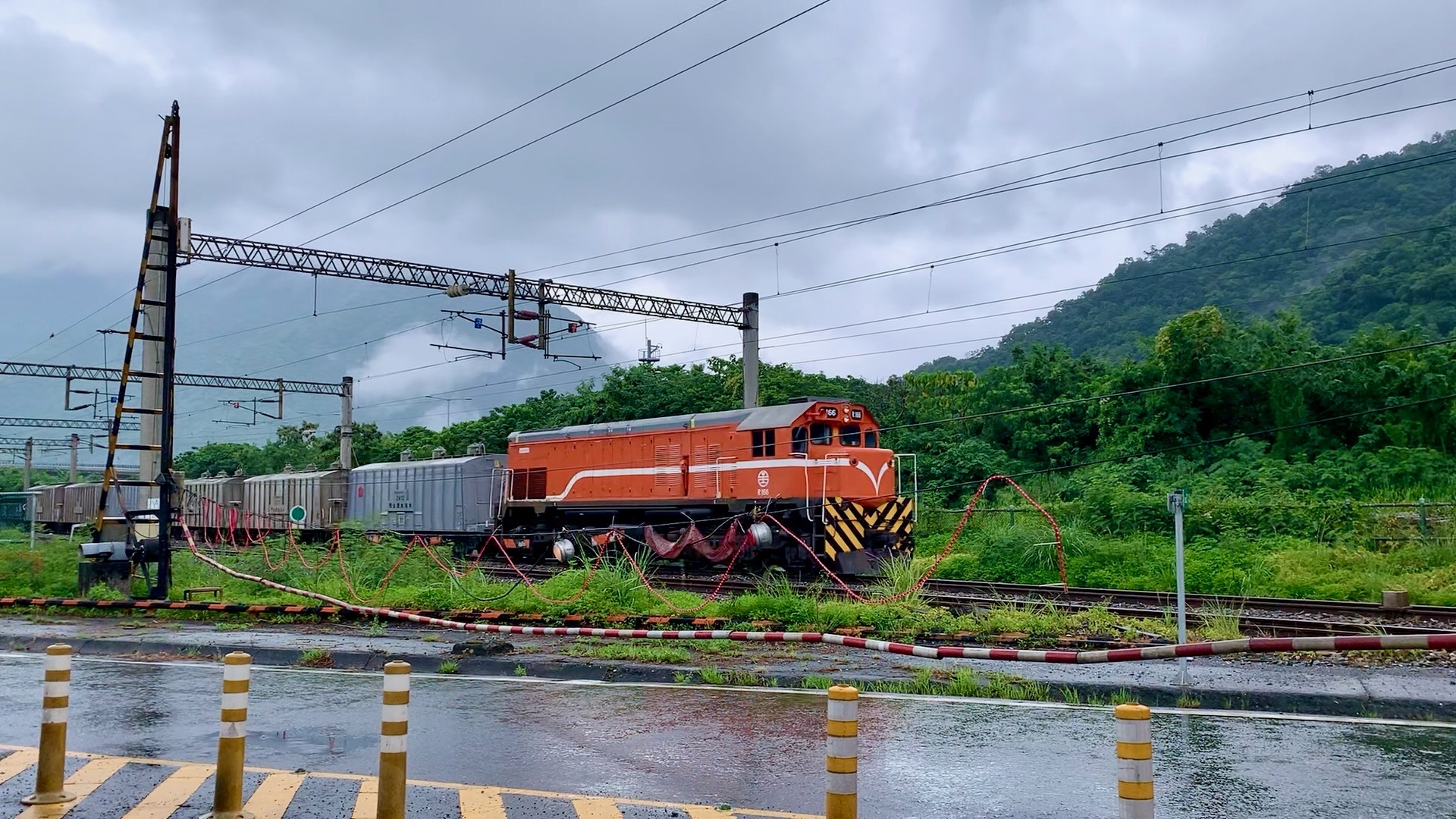
Freight train on North-Link line

== See also ==
- Ten Major Construction Projects
