= Eastern Trunk line =

Railway line in Taiwan

Overview
- Native name: 東部幹線
- Termini: Badu; Taitung
- Stations: 64 (Note: excluding Su'ao)

Service
- Type: Conventional railway
- Operator(s): Taiwan Railway

Technical
- Line length: 320.3 km (199.0 mi) (Note: excluding Su'ao branch, which is 3.4 km in length)
- Number of tracks: Varies
- Track gauge: 3 ft 6 in (1,067 mm)
- Electrification: 25 kV/60 Hz catenary
- Operating speed: 130km/h

The Eastern Trunk line (Chinese: 東部幹線; Pe̍h-ōe-jī: Tang-pō͘-kàn-soàⁿ) is a railway line of Taiwan Railway running along Taiwan's sparsely populated eastern corridor.

The Eastern Trunk line is a combination of line sections:

Name	Chinese	Taiwanese	Hakka	Length	Terminus
Yilan line	宜蘭線	Gî-lân Soàⁿ	Ngì-làn Sien	93.6 km (58.2 mi)	from Badu to Su'ao (via Su'aoxin)
North-link line	北迴線	Pak-hôe Soàⁿ	Pet-fûi Sien	79.2 km (49.2 mi)	from Su'aoxin to Hualien
Taitung line	臺東線	Tâi-tang Soàⁿ	Thòi-tûng Sien	150.9 km (93.8 mi)	from Hualien to Taitung

The length of the combined line is 323.7 km (201.1 mi).
