= Badu railway station =

Railway station in Nuannuan, Keelung, Taiwan

Badu 八堵
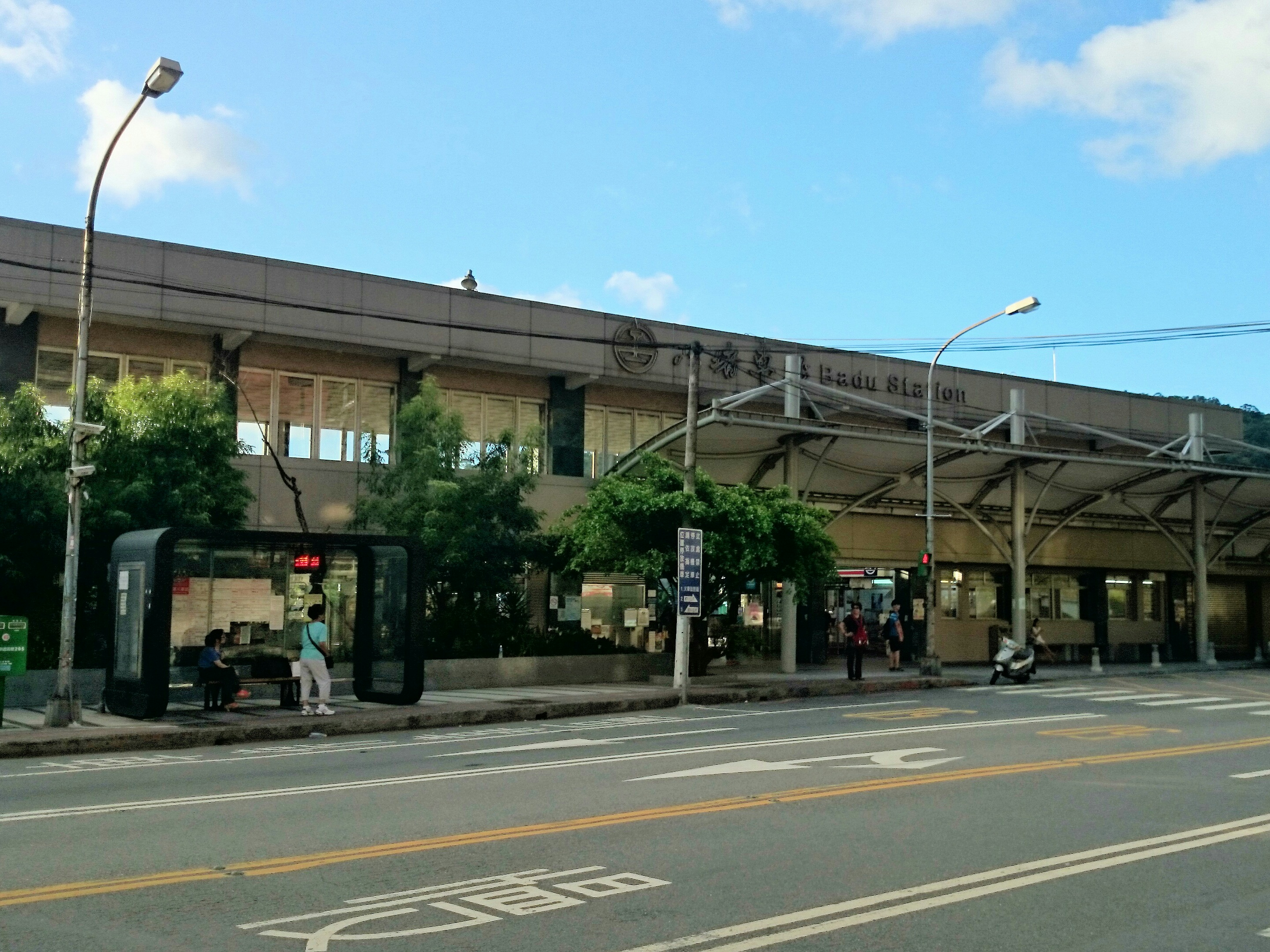

General information
- Location: 142 Badu Rd. Nuannuan, Keelung, Taiwan
- Coordinates: 25°6′30″N 121°43′44″E
- Operated by: Taiwan Railway Corporation
- Lines: Western Trunk line, Yilan line
- Distance: 3.7 km from Keelung, 0 km from Badu
- Platforms: 1 Island platform, 2 side platforms
- Connections: Bus stops

Construction
- Structure type: At-grade

History
- Opened: July 20, 1899 (original); 1986 (present building)

Passengers
- 4,640 daily (2024)

Services
| Preceding station | Taiwan Railway | Following station |
|---|---|---|
| Sankeng towards Keelung | Western Trunk line | Qidu towards Pingtung |
| Terminus | Eastern Trunk line | Nuannuan towards Taitung |
Location

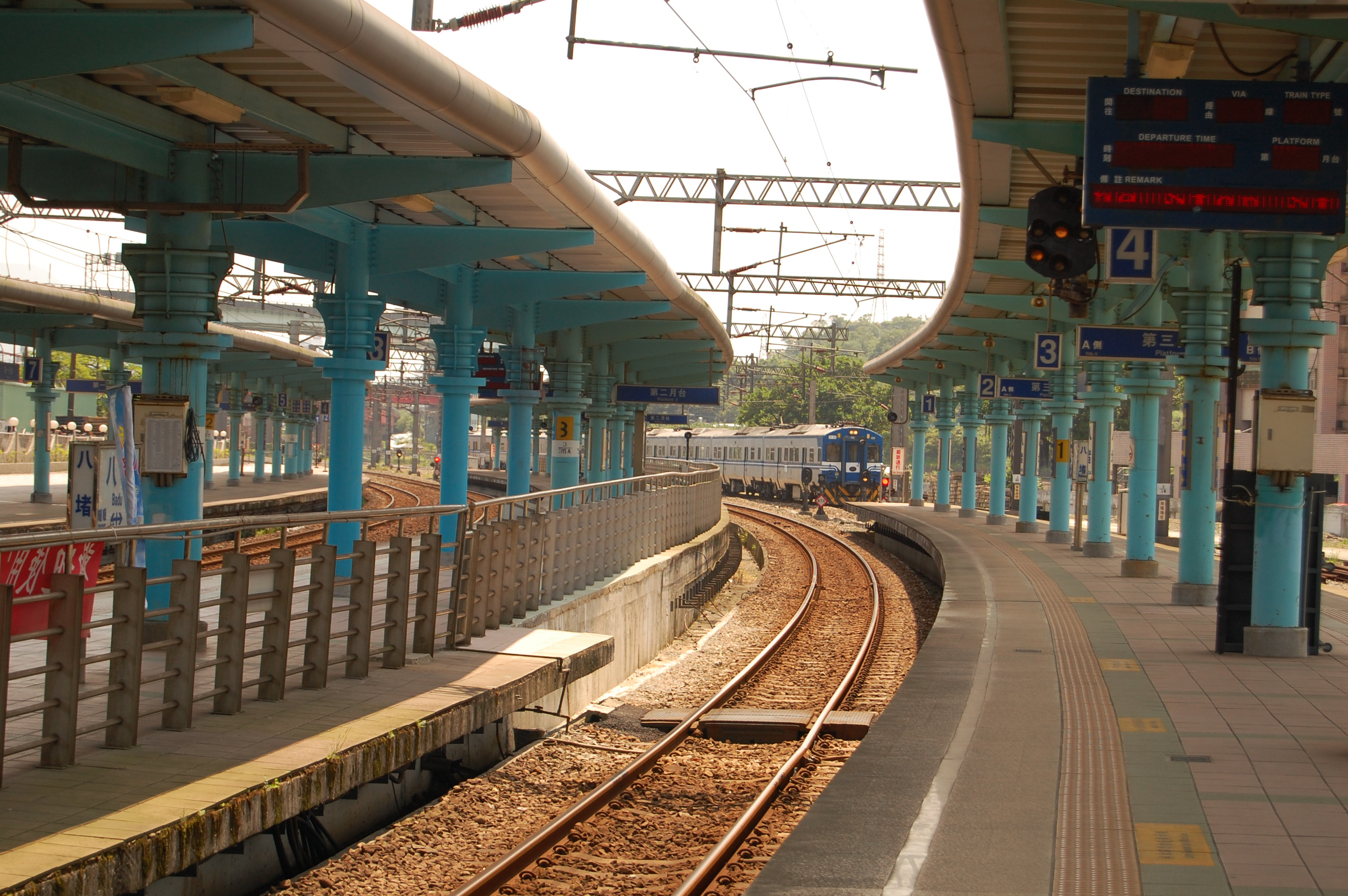
Badu station platform

Badu Station (Chinese: 八堵車站; pinyin: Bādǔ Chēzhàn; Pe̍h-ōe-jī: Peh-tó͘ Chhia-chām) is a railway station at the junction of the Taiwan Railway West Coast line and the Yilan line. It is the western terminus of the Yilan line and is located in Nuannuan District, Keelung, Taiwan.

== History ==
The station was opened in 1899 during Japanese rule. In April 1914, the rail line from Keelung to Haccho (Badu) was completed. The station has served as an important transfer point between the West Coast line and the Yilan line since 1919, when the first segment of the Yilan line was built.

The Badu railway station incident occurred in March 1947, as a part of anti-government protests known as the February 28 incident. On 1 March 1947, civilians at Badu railway station began protesting the government response to the events of the previous day, and attacked National Revolutionary Army servicemen. Military forces returned ten days later, killing between five and eight station employees, and removing at least eight more from their posts. The latter group vanished without a trace.

The current station building was completed in 1986, and a memorial to the victims of the February 28 incident was unveiled outside the station in 1994.

It is now one of the busiest stations in southern Keelung, with more than 5,000 passengers per day as of 2014.

== Platform layout ==
| 1 | 1 | ■ Yilan line (northbound arrival), West Coast line (southbound departure) | Toward Qidu, Taipei, Taichung, Kaohsiung, Pingtung |
| 2 | 2 | ■ Yilan line (southbound departure) | Toward Ruifang, Yilan, Su'aoxin |
| 3 | 3A | ■ West Coast line (southbound departure) | Toward Qidu, Taipei, Taichung, Kaohsiung, Pingtung |
| 4 | 3B | ■ West Coast line (northbound departure) | Toward Keelung |

== See also ==
- List of railway and metro stations in Taiwan
