= Taitung railway station =

Railway station in Taitung City, Taiwan

Taitung 台東
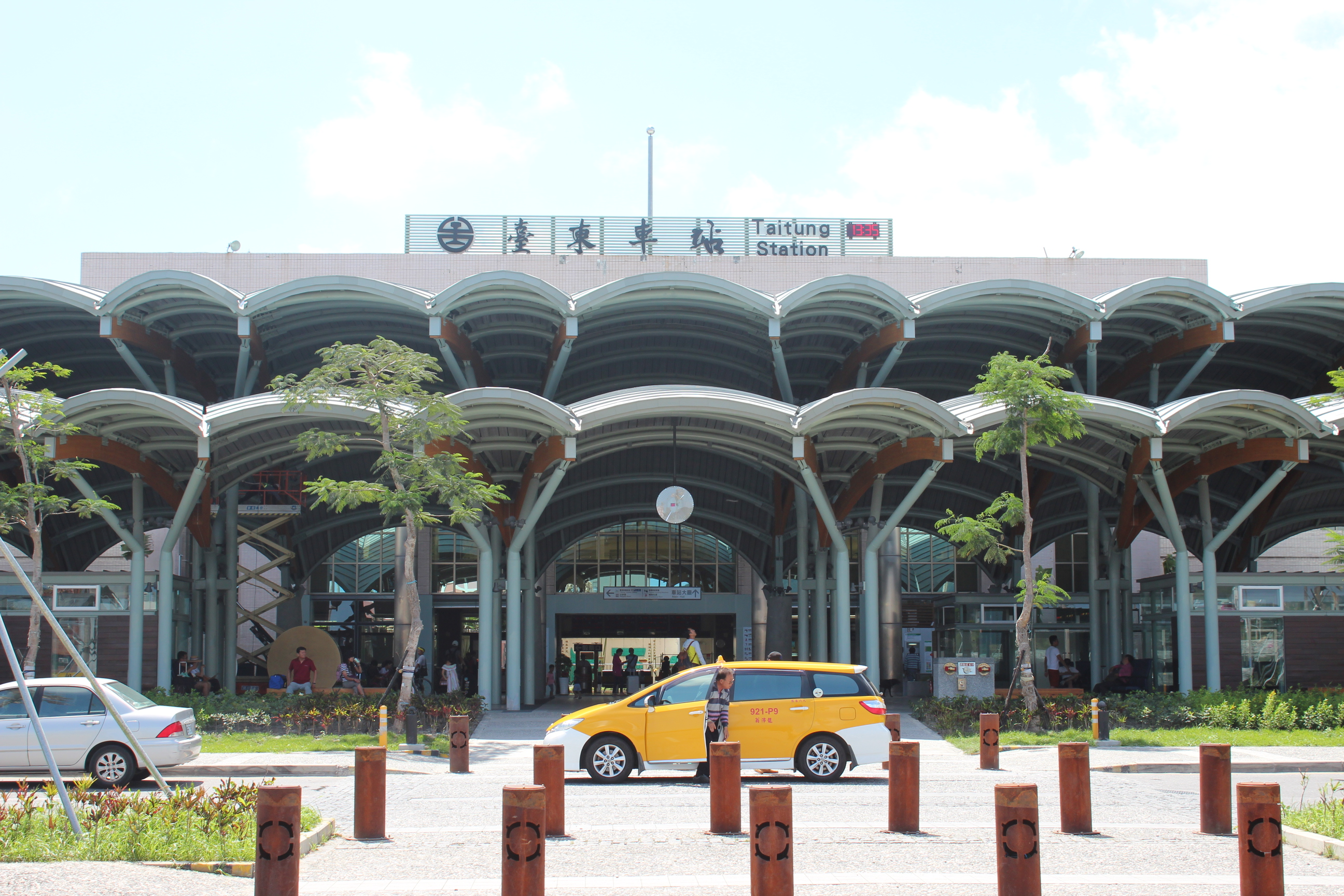

General information
- Location: 598 Ln 101 Yanwan Rd; Taitung City, Taitung; Taiwan
- Coordinates: 22°47′36″N 121°07′23″E
- Lines: Eastern Trunk line (004); South-link line (004)
- Distance: 151.9 km from Hualien; 98.2 km from Fangliao

Construction
- Structure type: Surface

Other information
- Station code: 004
- Classification: 一等站 (Taiwan Railways Administration level)

History
- Opened: 1982-06-27

Services
Preceding station	Taiwan Railway	Following station
Shanli towards Badu	Eastern Trunk line	Terminus
Kangle towards Pingtung	South-link line	Terminus
Location

Taitung (Chinese: 台東車站; pinyin: Táidōng Chēzhàn) is a railway station of Taiwan Railway. It lies at the junction of the Hualien-Taitung line and the South-link line in Taitung City, Taitung County, Taiwan.

== History ==
During the construction of the back part of Taitung station in 1980, a historic settlement area was discovered when a graveyard containing several thousand slate coffins was unearthed, with some bodies still within. Around 20,000 pieces of jade, pottery and stone tools were also found. This caught the attention of the government to carry out archaeological work and build a national museum to preserve the artifacts. The area officially opened in 1997 as the Beinan Cultural Park.

== Structure ==
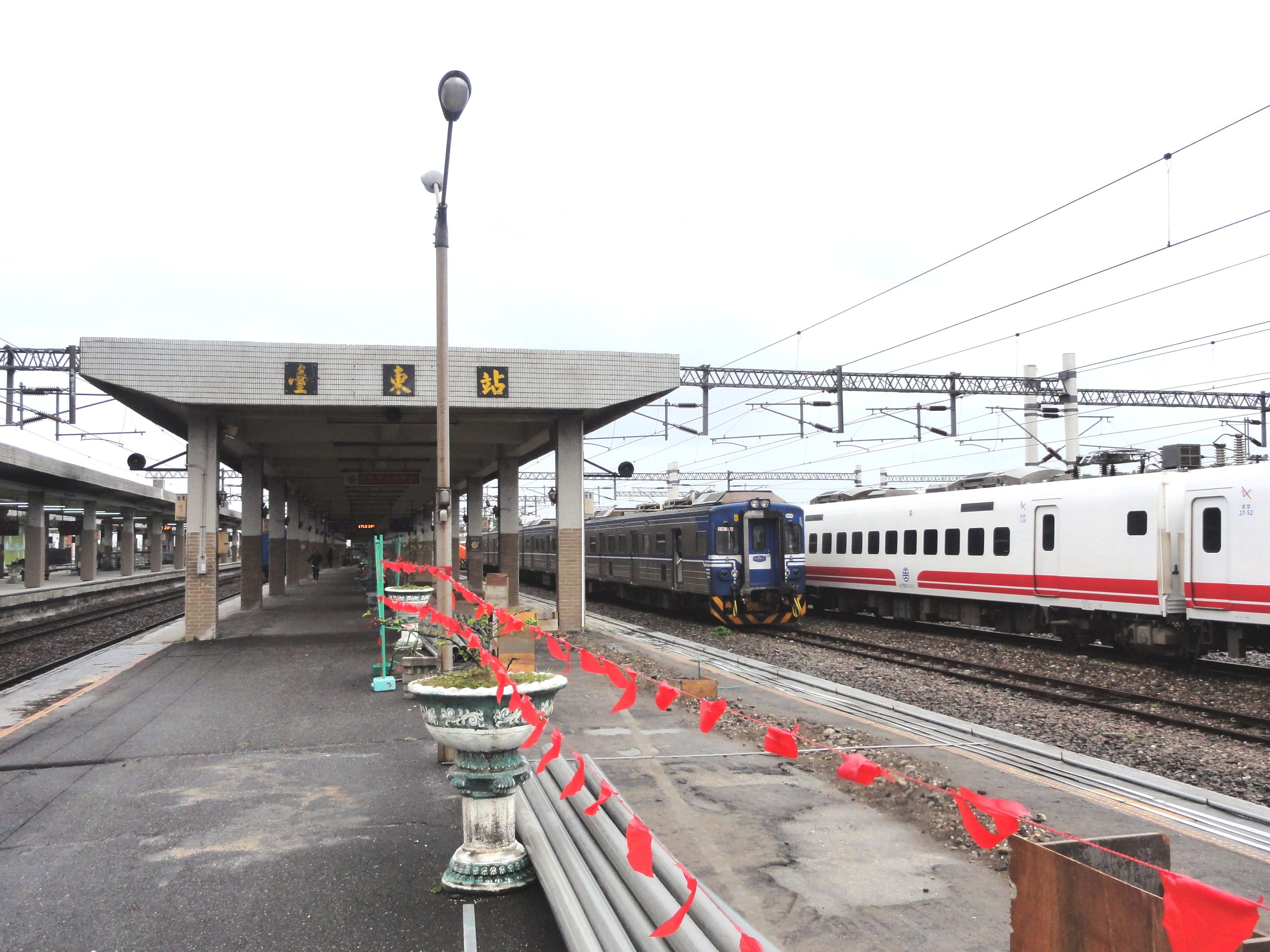
Taitung station platform

There are three island platforms. The station also features solar panels installed on 12 buildings within its parameters, which covers an area of 8,652 m^{2} and an installed generation capacity of 1.51 MW.

== Service ==
- Currently a 1st grade station
  - Most trains from Taipei Station terminate at this station whilst some continue on to Zhiben Station on the South-link Line.
  - The station is equipped with elevators and escalators.

Year	Ridership
1998	1,760
1999	1,868
2000	2,447
2001	2,897
2002	3,266
2003	2,915
2004	3,223
2005	3,435
2006	3,475
2007	3,483
2008	3,597
2009	3,060
2010	3,595
2011	3,738
2012	4,002
2013	4,258
2014	4,956
2015	5,283
2016	5,253

== Around the station ==
- Peinan Site Park
- Taitung Forest Park

== See also ==
- List of railway stations in Taiwan
