= The Culinary Institute of Taiwan =

College in Shoufeng, Hualien County, Taiwan

- 臺灣觀光學院
- Type: private college
- Active: 15 June 1989 (as Ging Chung Business College); 25 October 2001 (as CIT)–1 September 2021
- Location: Shoufeng, Hualien County, Taiwan; 23.8570°N 121.4860°E
- Website: Official website
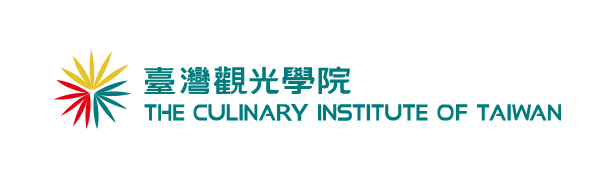

The Culinary Institute of Taiwan
- Traditional Chinese: 臺灣觀光學院
Transcriptions
Standard Mandarin
- Hanyu Pinyin: Táiwān Guānguāng Xuéyuàn

The Culinary Institute of Taiwan (CIT; Chinese: 臺灣觀光學院) was a private college in Shoufeng Township, Hualien County, Taiwan.

The institute offers a variety of culinary programs, including a 2-year Associate Degree in Culinary Arts, a 1-year Certificate in Culinary Arts, and a 6-month Professional Pastry and Baking Course. The curriculum is designed to give students hands-on experience in cooking, baking, and food service, as well as a strong foundation in the culinary arts.

== History ==
CIT was founded as Ging Chung Business College on 15 June 1989. It was later on renamed as Taiwan Hospitality and Tourism College. On 25 October 2001, the college was upgraded to The Culinary Institute of Taiwan. In 2020, the college had an enrollment rate of only 39.5%. In 2021, the college announced its closure on 1 September 2021.

== Faculties ==
- Department of Chinese Culinary Arts
- Department of Food and Beverage Management
- Department of Hotel Management
- Department of Leisure Management
- Department of Tourism Management
- Department of Travel Management
- Department of Western Culinary Arts

== Transportation ==
CIT is within walking distance northwest of Fengtian Station of Taiwan Railway.

== See also ==
- List of universities in Taiwan
