= Provincial Highway 11 (Taiwan) =

Provincial highway in Taiwan

Provincial Highway 11
- 台11線
- Hualien-Taitung Coastal Highway

Route information
- Maintained by Directorate General of Highways
- Length: 177.482 km (110.282 mi)

Major junctions
- North end: Prov 9 in Ji'an, Hualien
- South end: Prov 9 in Taimali, Taitung

Location
- Country: Taiwan

Highway system
- Highway system in Taiwan
← Prov 10	→ Prov 12

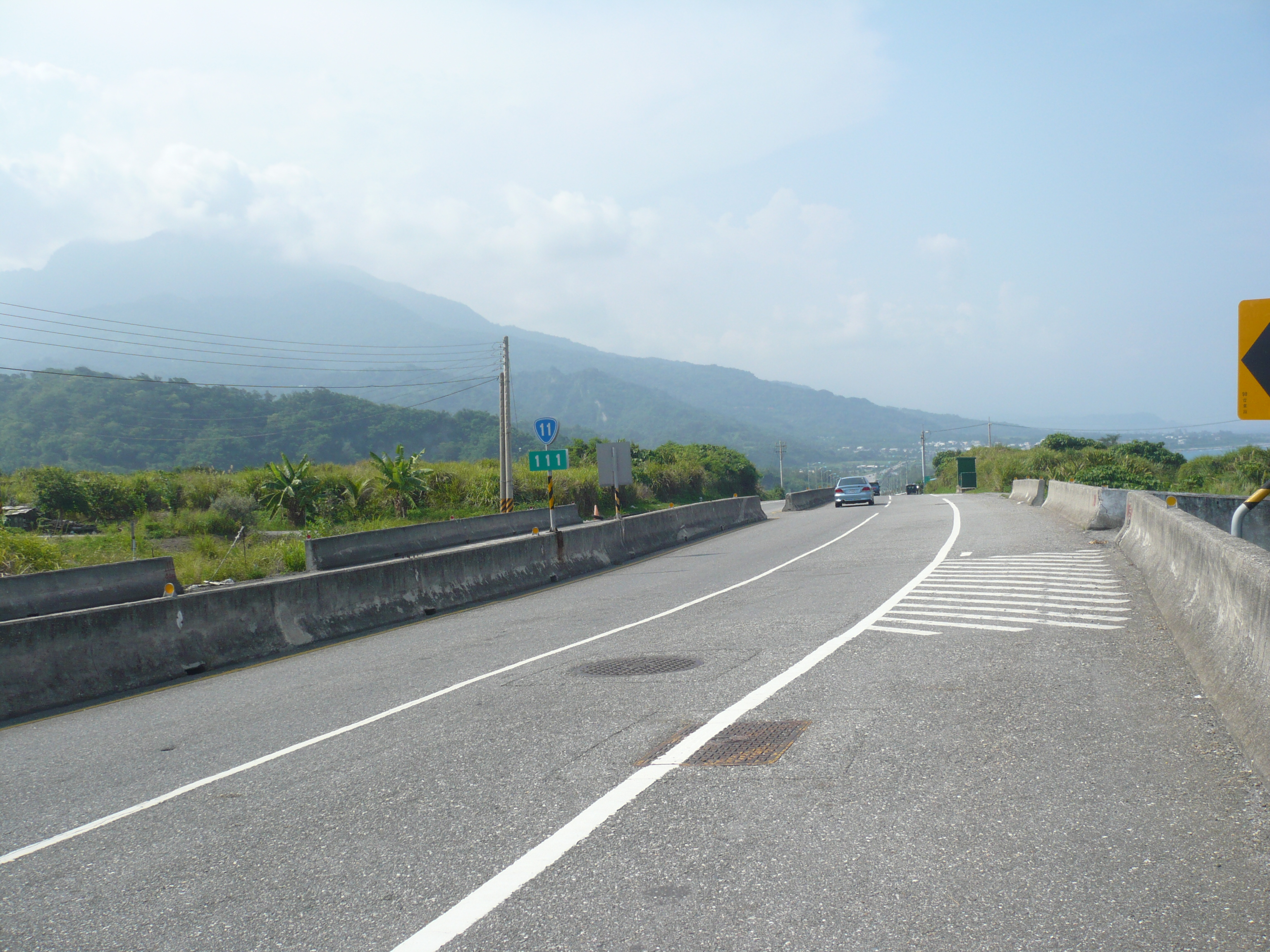
Provincial Highway 11

Provincial Highway 11, also known as Hualien-Taitung Coastal Highway for its connection between Hualien County and Taitung County, is located on the east coast of Taiwan. This highway, which is 178.229 km, begins in Hualien City and ends in Taitung City. It also has 3 branch lines. The East Coast National Scenic Area and Farglory Ocean Park (Hualien Ocean Park) are also located on this highway. It was called Tōkaidō during Japanese rule period.

== Route Description ==
The highway begins in Ji'an, Hualien at the intersection of Provincial Highway 9. The road runs parallel along the eastern coast of Taiwan for most of its length, passing through coastal townships of Shoufeng and Fengbin in Hualien County, as well as Changbin, Chenggong, Donghe, Beinan, Taitung City in Taitung County before ending at Highway 9 in Taimali, Taitung.

The highway is a popular scenic bypass of Highway 9, which runs through the more populated Huatung Valley. The highway attracts visitors for its unique rock formations along The East Coast National Scenic Area, such as Shitiping (石梯坪) in Fengbin, Baxiandong archeological site (八仙洞遺址) in Changbin, as well as Sanxiantai (三仙台) and Shiyusan (石雨傘) in Chenggong. The highway also passes through Chihpen, a suburb in Taitung City known for its hot springs.

== Spur Routes ==
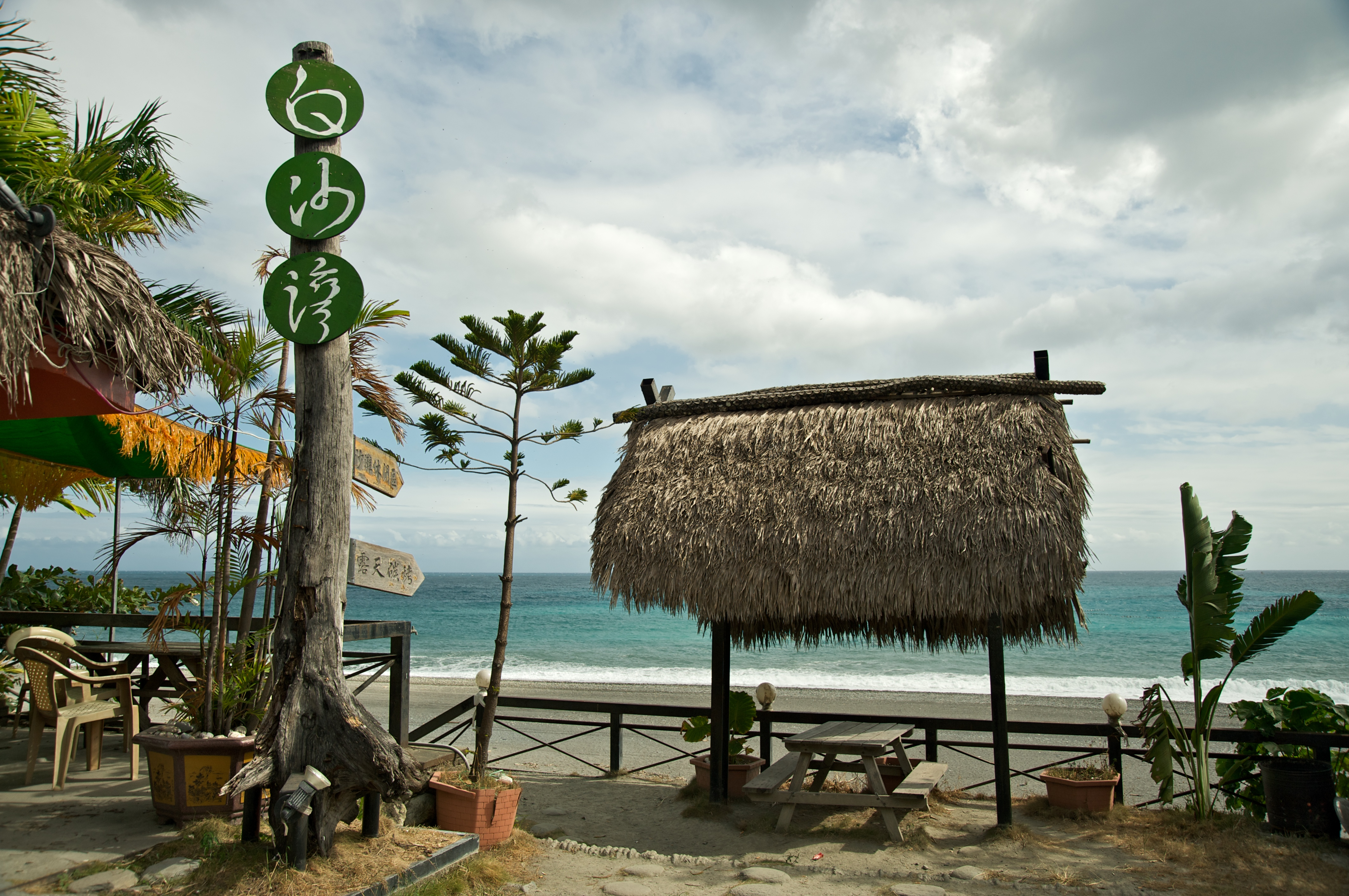
Beach at Taimali Town by the highway

- Provincial Highway No. 11A: The highway starts at Highway 9 in Guangfu, Hualien and ends at Highway 11 in Fengbin, Hualien. It was an old segment of Highway 11 until the new route to Ji'an was built. The total length is 19.162 km.
- Provincial Highway No. 11B: The highway starts at Highway 9 and ends at Highway 11. The highway was an old segment of Highway 11, and is entirely located within Taitung City. The total length is 7.406 km.
- Provincial Highway No. 11C: The highway starts at Highway 11 in Ji'an, Hualien and ends at Highway 9 in Shoufeng, Hualien. The highway connects National Dong Hwa University with both highways. The total length is 18.301 km.

== See also ==
- Highway system in Taiwan
