= Fengtian railway station =

Railway station in Shoufeng, Hualien County, Taiwan

Fengtian 豐田車站
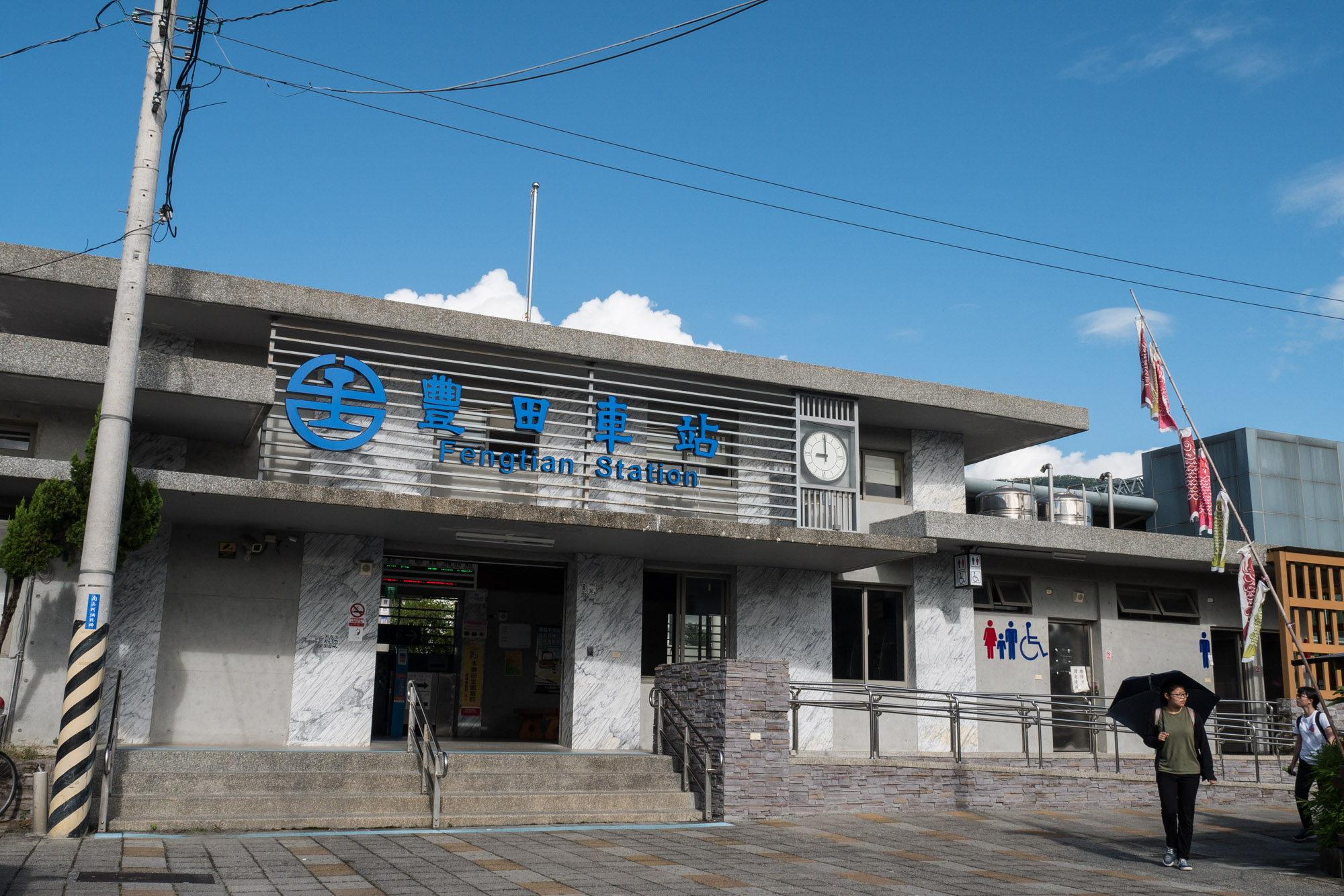

General information
- Location: Shoufeng, Hualien County, Taiwan
- Coordinates: 23°50′54.5″N 121°29′46.2″E
- System: Train station
- Owner: Taiwan Railway Corporation
- Operator: Taiwan Railway Corporation
- Line: Hualien–Taitung
- Train operators: Taiwan Railway Corporation

History
- Opened: 1 May 1913

Passengers
- 86 daily (2024)

Services
Preceding station	Taiwan Railway	Following station
Shoufeng towards Badu	Eastern Trunk line	Linrong Shin Kong towards Taitung
Location

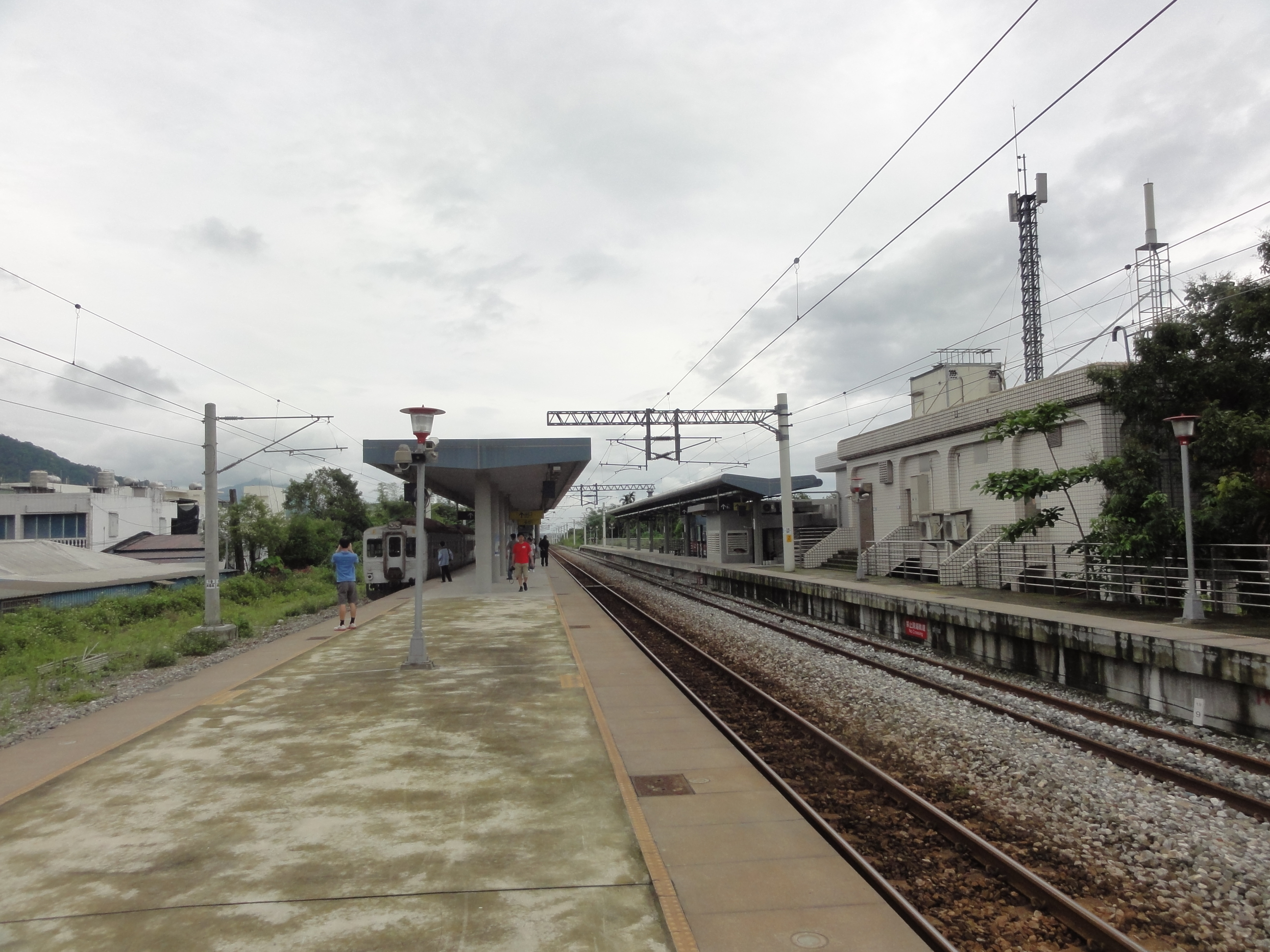
Fengtian station platform

Fengtian (Chinese: 豐田車站; pinyin: Fēngtián Chēzhàn) is a railway station on Taiwan Railway Hualien–Taitung line located in Shoufeng Township, Hualien County, Taiwan.

== History ==
The station was opened on 1 May 1913.

== Around the station ==
- Taiwan Hospitality and Tourism University
- Hualien River
- Hualien Archaeological Museum

== See also ==
- List of railway stations in Taiwan
