= Cingsio Temple =

Buddhist temple in Hualien County, Taiwan

- 吉安慶修院
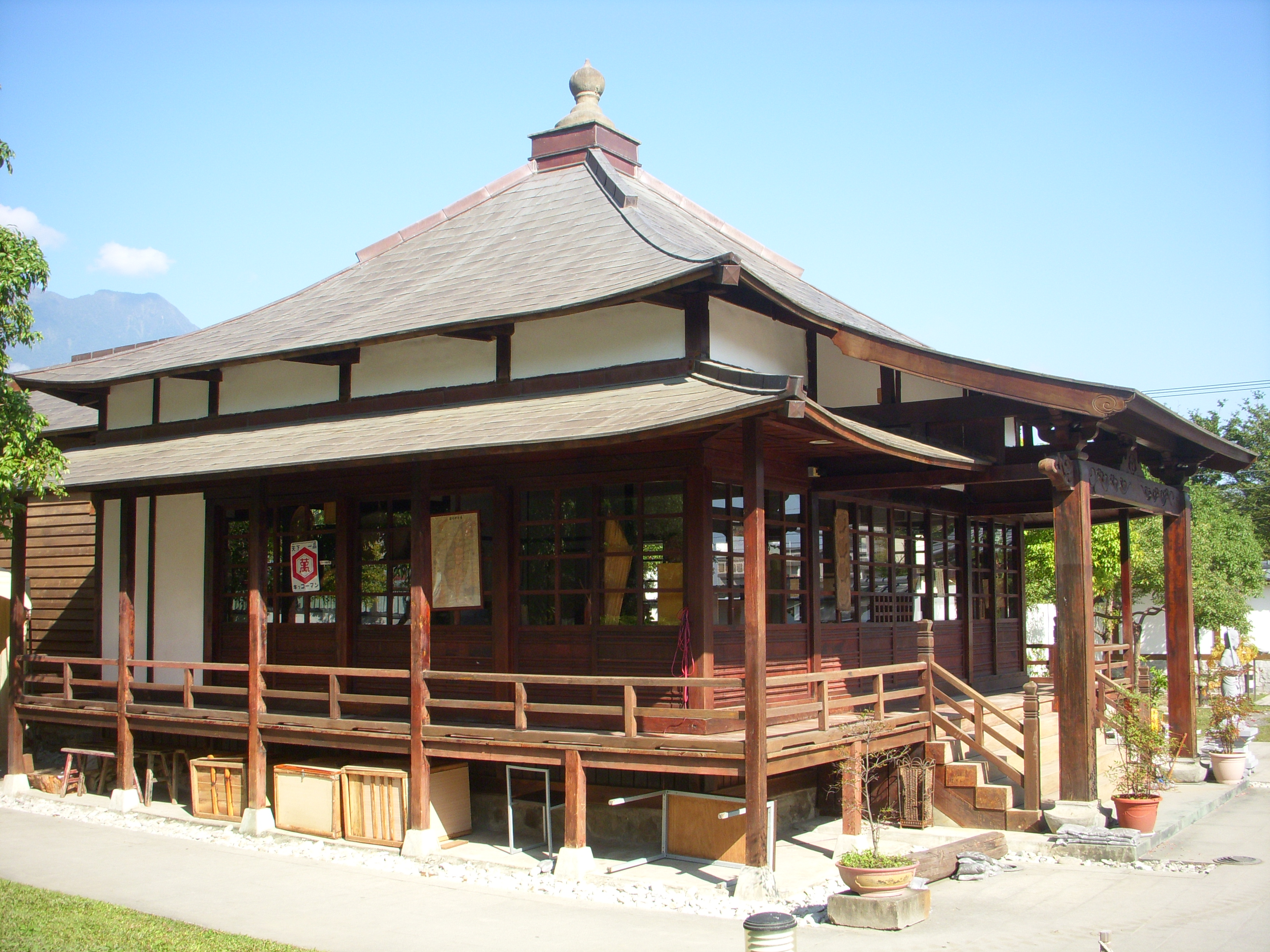
- Main hall

Religion
- Affiliation: Buddhism
- Sect: Shingon Buddhism (historically)
- Region: Hualien County
- Deity: Śākyamuni Buddha and Guanyin

Location
- Location: Ji'an Village
- Municipality: Ji'an Township
- Country: Taiwan
- Interactive map of Cingsio Temple
- Coordinates: 23.97370°N 121.56474°E

Architecture
- Type: Buddhist temple
- Style: Japanese timber Buddhist architecture
- Established: 1917
- Materials: Timber

Cingsio Temple (Chinese: 慶修院; pinyin: Qìngxiūyuàn; Japanese: Keishū-in) is a historic Buddhist site in Ji'an Township, Hualien County, Taiwan. It developed from the Yoshino preaching mission of the Kōyasan branch of Shingon Buddhism, which served the Japanese immigrant settlement of Yoshino during Japanese rule. The site preserves a Japanese-style timber Buddhist hall and a collection of religious objects associated with Shingon practice and the Shikoku Pilgrimage.

== History ==
Yoshino was established in eastern Taiwan as a Japanese agricultural immigrant settlement during the colonial period. A Shingon mission was established there in 1917, when Japanese resident Kawabata Manji (川端滿二) raised funds for a local preaching centre. The institution was known as the Yoshino Preaching Mission (吉野布教所) of the Kōyasan branch of Shingon Buddhism. Although 1917 is used as the establishment date of the mission, research based on surviving colonial-period and postwar documents places construction of the extant main mission building in the early 1920s, beginning around 1922 and reaching completion around 1924.

The mission belonged to the Kōyasan tradition centred on Kongōbu-ji and functioned as one of the Shingon preaching centres in eastern Taiwan. During the Japanese period its principal objects of devotion included Kūkai, the founder of Shingon Buddhism, Acala (Fudō Myōō), and Vaiśravaṇa. In addition to religious services, the mission provided functions associated with education, medical assistance and funerary rites for the immigrant community.

In 1928, a series of stone Buddhist images representing the 88 temples of the Shikoku Pilgrimage was installed on the grounds, together with a hyakudo-ishi, a stone marker used in a form of repeated devotional pilgrimage. The complex was expanded again in the early 1930s with additional religious and funerary facilities.

Following the end of Japanese rule in 1945, the Japanese clergy left Taiwan and the former mission passed into local custody. Wu Tianmei (吳添妹), a local Buddhist laywoman, took responsibility for the site, which became known as Keishuin (慶修院). The principal worship in the main hall changed from the Shingon deities to Śākyamuni Buddha and Guanyin, although several objects associated with the earlier Shingon period remained at the site. Major repairs were carried out in 1964 and 1972.

On 1 April 1997, Ji'an Keishuin was formally designated as a historic monument by the Hualien County authorities. A subsequent conservation project restored the main building and reorganized the historic grounds; the restored complex was opened to the public in 2003.

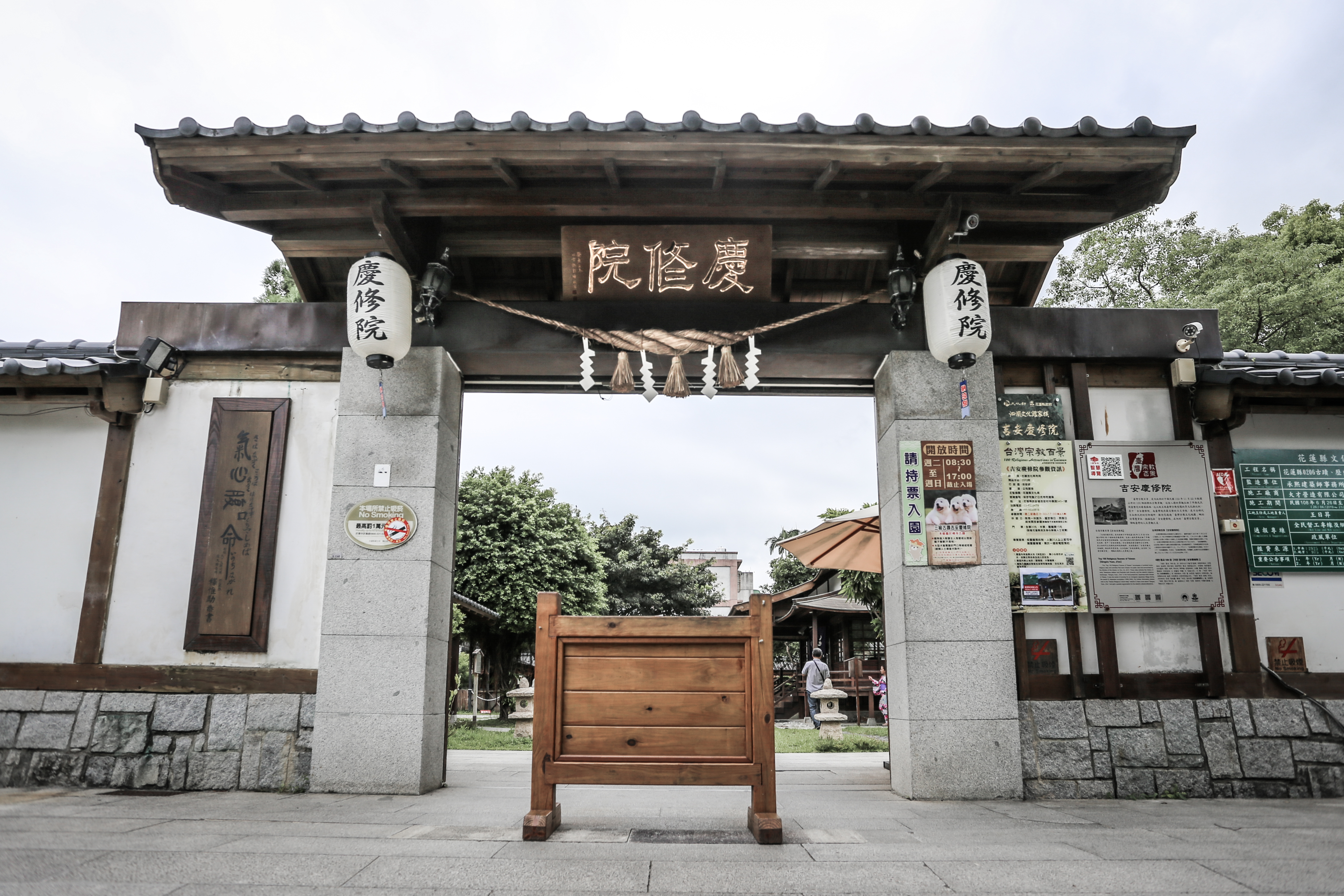
Main gate

== Architecture ==
The main hall is a timber-framed structure derived from Japanese Buddhist architectural traditions. It is three bays wide and four bays deep, with the central bay extending toward the rear to form the preaching and altar area. A projecting entrance canopy is attached to the front, while verandas with wooden railings run along three sides of the building. The roof is a Japanese hōgyō-zukuri pyramidal roof, without a horizontal ridge, and is covered with metal sheeting.

The timber frame includes penetrating tie beams, bracket complexes and carved projecting beam ends. Heritage documentation describes the building as displaying architectural features derived from Japanese Edo-period temple construction while incorporating modifications suited to Taiwan's climate. A conservation study published by the Hualien County Cultural Affairs Bureau in 2025 identified the Miei-dō at Kongōbu-ji on Mount Kōya as an architectural reference for the main hall.

== Religious objects and grounds ==
The grounds contain an arrangement representing the 88 temples of the Shikoku Pilgrimage. The original stone figures were installed in 1928, but a number were lost, removed or relocated during the postwar period. Heritage research recorded 16 original figures remaining at the site, while later restoration work reconstructed the sequence so that the 88 pilgrimage stations could again be represented within the grounds.

Other surviving objects associated with the Shingon period include an image of Acala, the hyakudo-ishi, and a stone monument inscribed Kōmyō Shingon Hyakumanben (光明真言百萬遍), referring to one million recitations of the Mantra of Light. These objects, together with the former preaching hall, document the site's historical association with Japanese Shingon Buddhist practice in colonial Taiwan.

== Conservation ==
The complex has undergone several phases of repair and conservation since the postwar period. The earthquake of 3 April 2024 caused damage to the historic timber building, including displacement in parts of the structural frame and deterioration of wall surfaces. The building remained open after temporary reinforcement because inspections found no immediate danger of collapse. In 2025, the Hualien County Cultural Affairs Bureau prepared an emergency conservation and restoration plan addressing the earthquake damage and the longer-term reuse of the monument.
