= Ji'an, Hualien =

Ji'an Township 吉安鄉 Yoshino
- Rural township
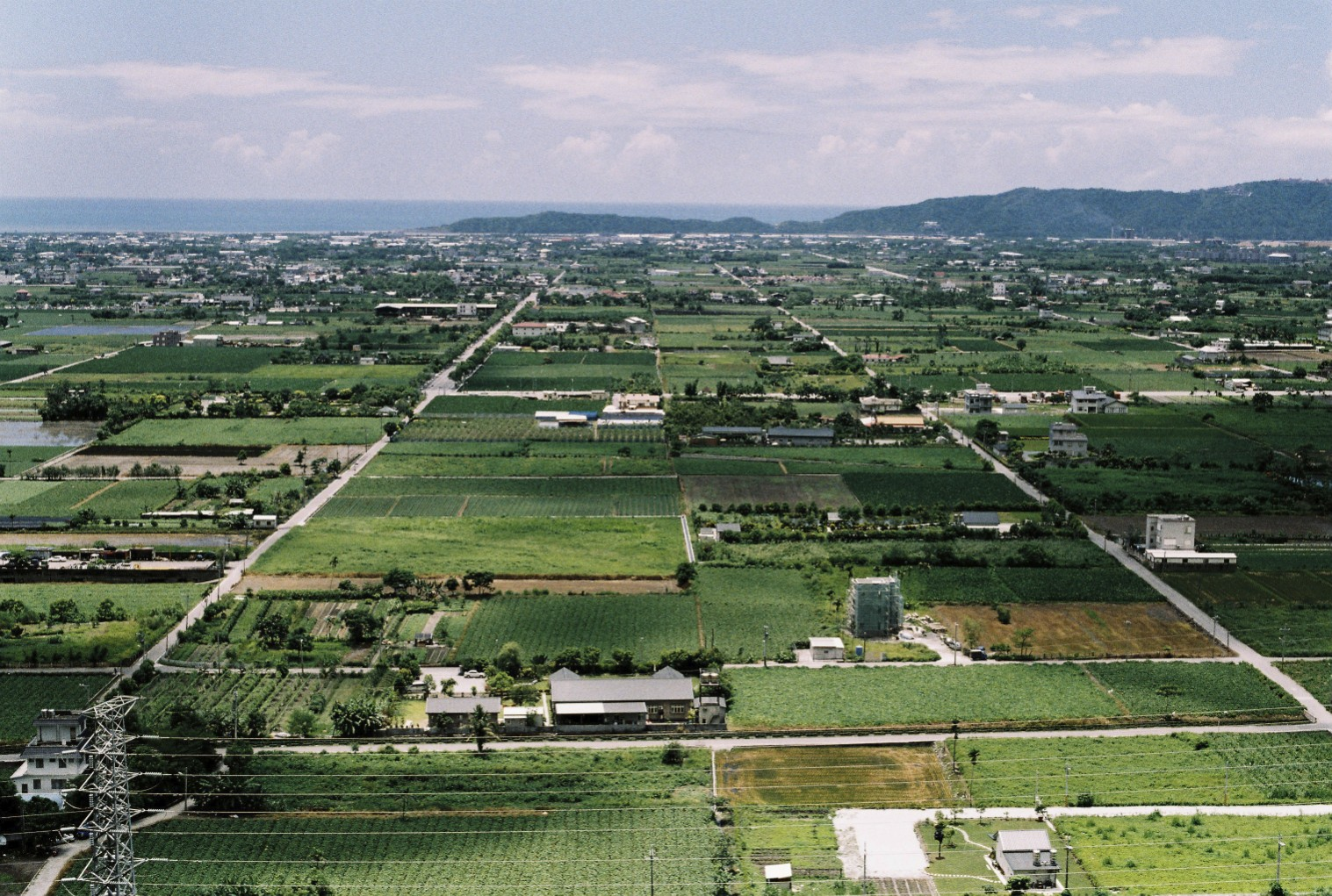

- Coordinates: 23°57′0″N 121°34′20″E
- Country: Taiwan
- Region: Eastern Taiwan

Government
  - Type: Township

Area
  - Total: 65.2582 km^{2} (25.1963 sq mi)

Population (February 2023)
  - Total: 82,840
- Time zone: UTC+8 (CST)
- Post code: 973
- Subdivision: 18 Villages
- Website: www.ji-an.gov.tw

Ji'an Township (Chinese: 吉安鄉; pinyin: Jí'ān Xiāng; Pe̍h-ōe-jī: Kiat-an-hiong; Hakka: Kit-ôn-hiông), is a rural township in Hualien County, Taiwan. It has 18 villages and a population of 83,750 inhabitants.

Ji'an is the second most populous place in Hualien County after Hualien city). The township has mountainsides, a seashore and a wide alluvial plain. The main inhabitants include Hoklo, Hakka, and Aboriginal peoples. The economy is flourishing in areas of agriculture, commerce and industry, and is deeply connected with the adjacent city Hualien city.

== History ==
Ji'an was first settled by the aboriginal Amis people and was called Cikasuan, meaning a flourishing timber land in the Amis language. Han Chinese settlers arrived in the 1850s and called the area Chhit-kha-chhuan (七腳川). The original Amis inhabitants allied themselves with the Qing dynasty and against the Sakizaya and Kavalan people during the Takobowan incident in 1878. During Japanese rule, the Amis guarded the area for the Japanese authorities, against the Truku people. The Amis were underpaid for their services, and organized an uprising, after which the Japanese removed them from the area. Subsequently, the Governor-General of Taiwan encouraged Japanese to immigrate the regions of Hualien and Taitung and established a village here called Yoshino (吉野) in 1910. In 1937, it was reformed and administered by Karenkō Prefecture. In 1948 after the Kuomintang takeover, to reduce the Japanese flavor of the name, it was renamed as the current Ji'an Township.

== Geography ==
The township is located at the Huadong Valley. It has subtropical monsoon and humid climate with summer average temperature of 27.3°C (81°F) and winter average temperature of 17.3°C (63°F).

== Administrative divisions ==
Yongan, Taichang, Qingfeng, Jian, Fuxing, Nanhua, Gancheng, Yongxing, Daoxiang, Nanchang, Yichang, Beichang, Shengan, Renli, Tungchang, Renan, Renhe and Guanghua Village.

== Tourist attractions ==
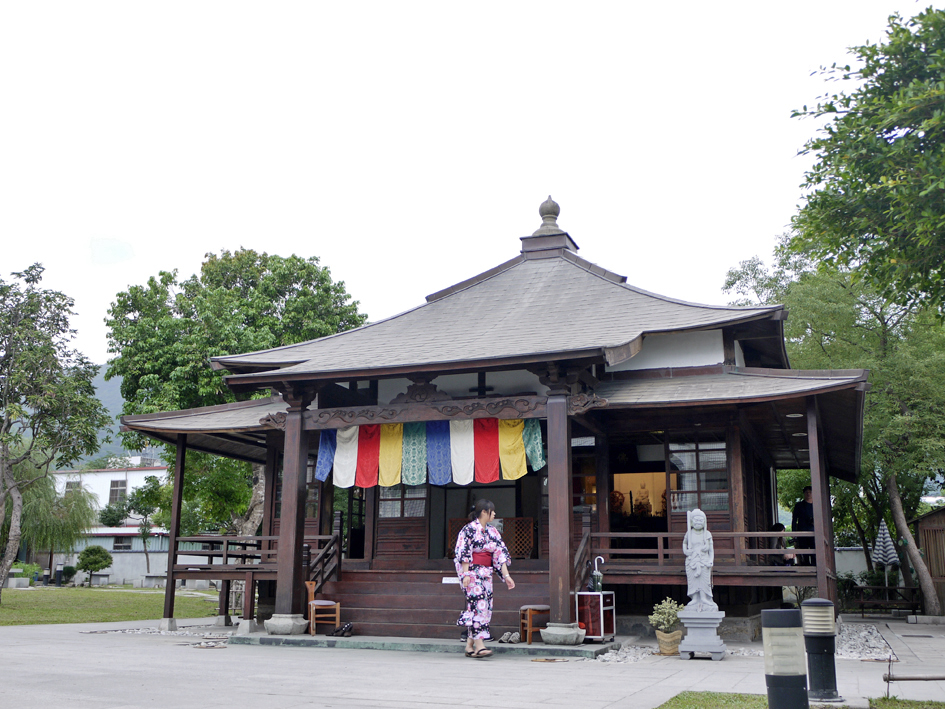
Cingsio Temple

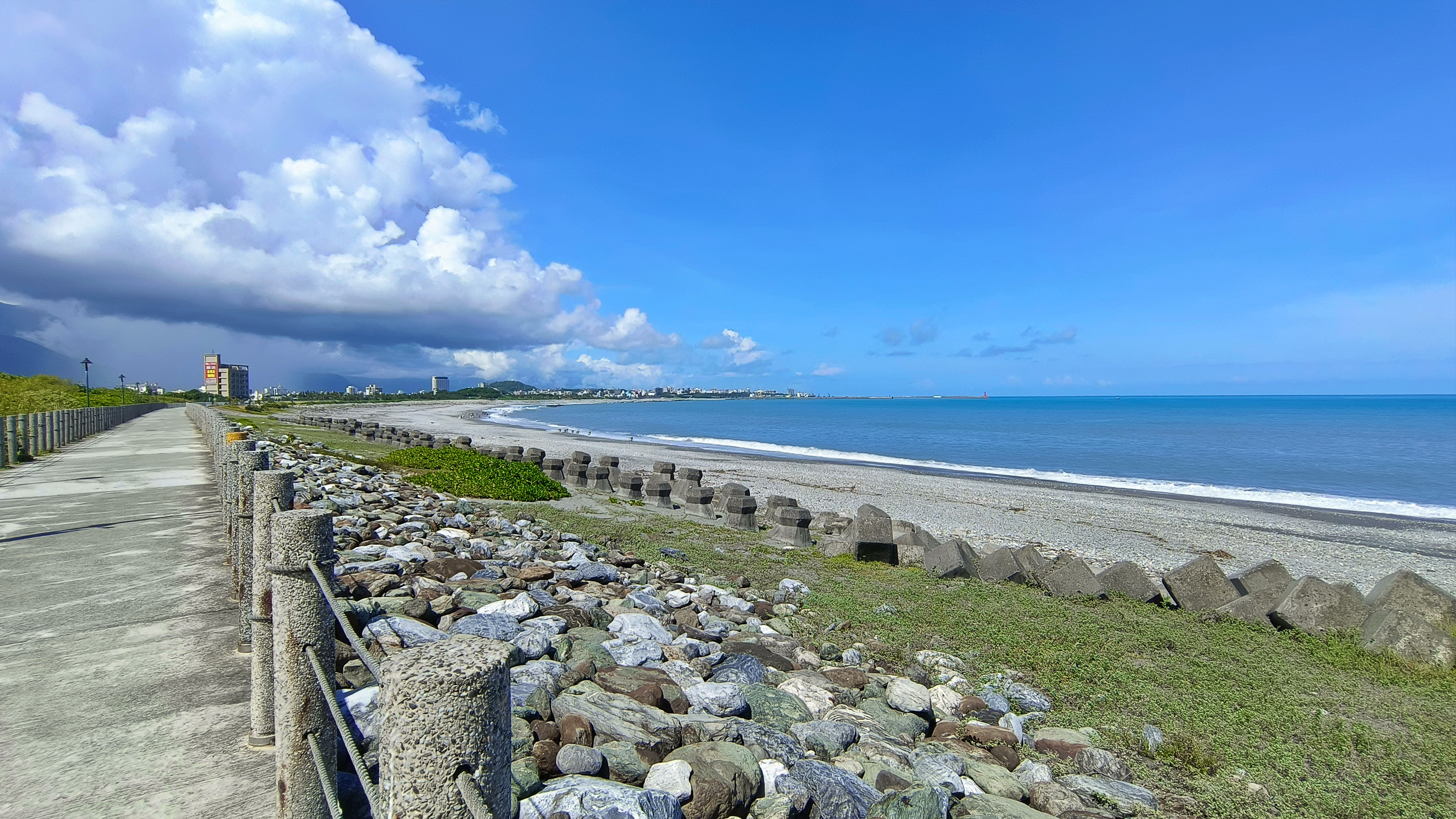
Huaren Seawall

- A-mei Civilization Village
- Big River Praise
- Cingsio Temple
- Spoondrift
- Tulip Garden
- Nan Pu Green Forest Park
- Maple Forest Trail
- Chi Jiue Chuan Bicycle Trail

== Transportation ==
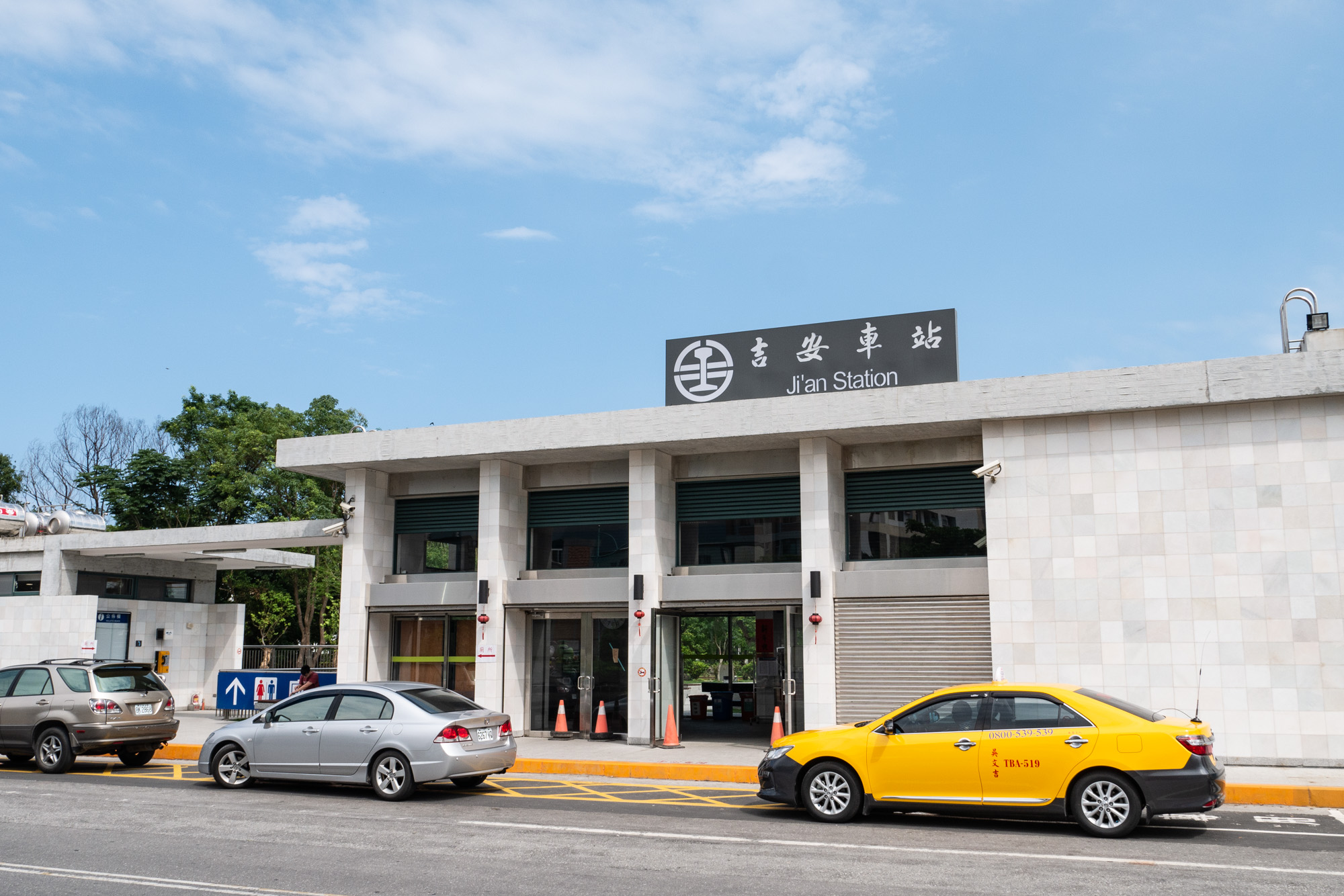
Ji'an Station

=== Rail ===
- TR Ji'an Station (Hwa-tung Line)

=== Road ===
- Provincial Highway No.9
- Provincial Highway No.11
- Provincial Highway No.11C
- County Road No. 193
