= Pinghe railway station =

Railway station in Shoufeng, Hualien County, Taiwan

Pinghe Station 平和車站
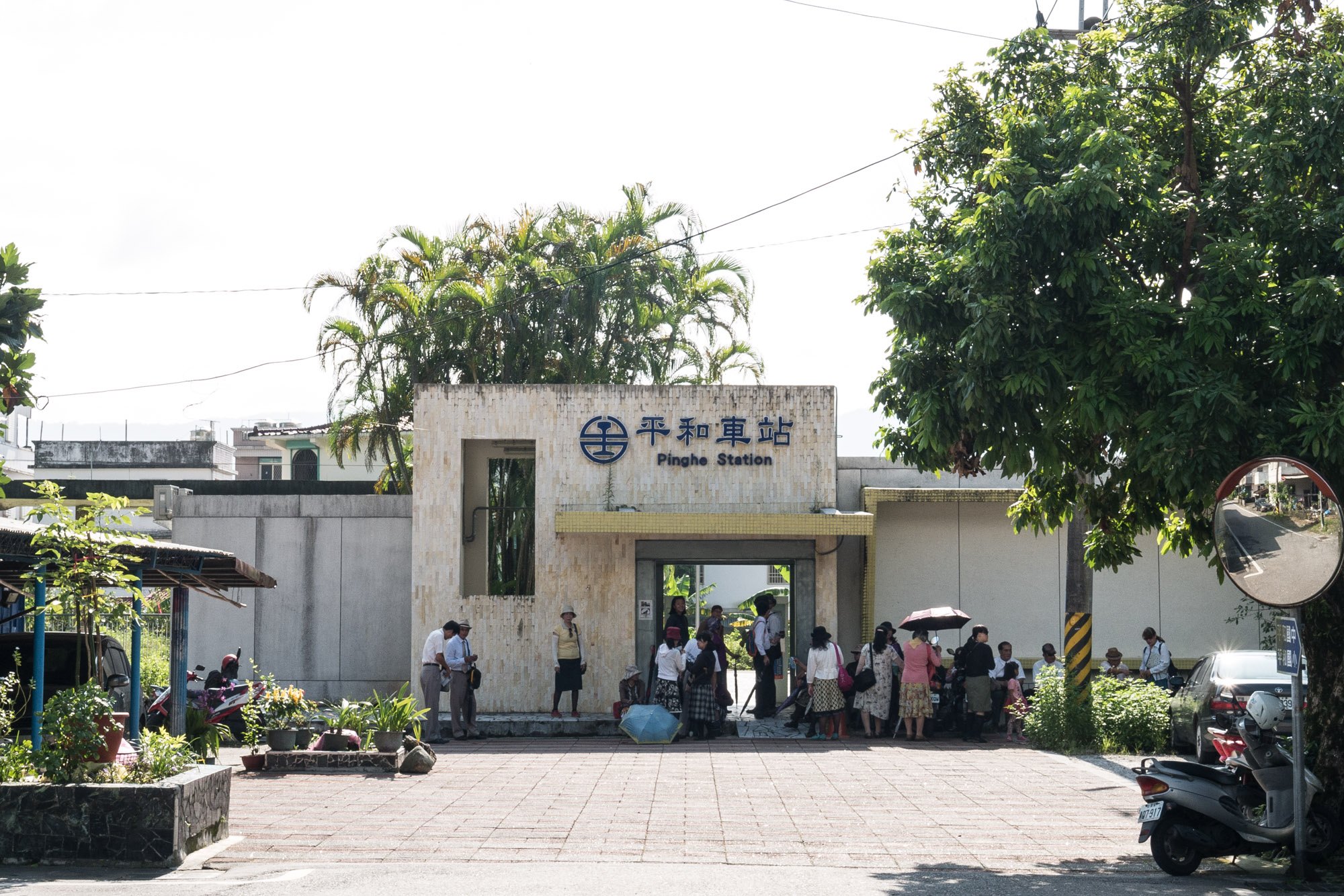

General information
- Location: Shoufeng, Hualien County, Taiwan
- Coordinates: 23°52′57.7″N 121°31′14.1″E
- System: Train station
- Owner: Taiwan Railway Corporation
- Operator: Taiwan Railway Corporation
- Line: Taitung
- Train operators: Taiwan Railway Corporation

History
- Opened: 20 April 1934

Passengers
- 20 daily (2024)

Services
Preceding station	Taiwan Railway	Following station
Zhixue towards Badu	Eastern Trunk line	Shoufeng towards Taitung
Location

Pinghe (traditional Chinese: 平和車站; simplified Chinese: 平和车站; pinyin: Pínghé chēzhàn) is a railway station on Taiwan Railway Taitung line located in Shoufeng Township, Hualien County, Taiwan.

== History ==
The station was opened on 20 April 1934.

== See also ==
- List of railway stations in Taiwan
