= Fengbin =

Rural township in Hualien County, Taiwan

Fengbin Township 豐濱鄉 Toyohama
- Rural township
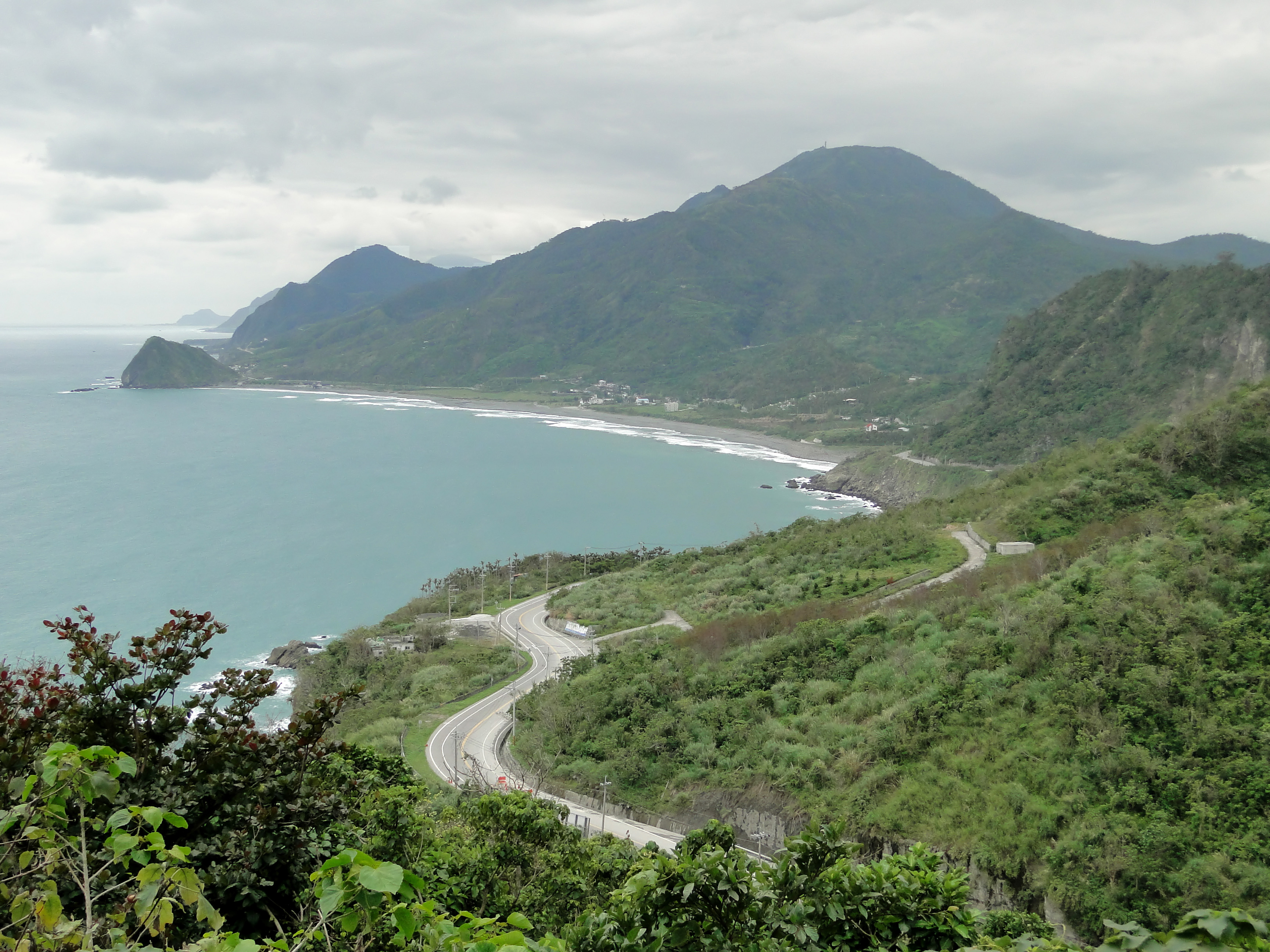

- Fengbin Township in Hualien County

- Location within Taiwan
- Coordinates: 23.591055°N 121.503794°E
- Country: Taiwan
- Province: Taiwan
- County: Hualien

Area
  - Total: 162.4 km^{2} (62.7 sq mi)

Population (February 2023)
  - Total: 4,310
  - Density: 26.5/km^{2} (68.7/sq mi)
- Website: http://www.feng-bin.gov.tw/bin/home.php

Fengbin Township

Chinese name
- Chinese: 豐濱鄉
- Hanyu Pinyin: Fēngbīn Xiāng
- Wade–Giles: Feng^{1}-pin^{1} Hsiang^{1}
- Pha̍k-fa-sṳ: Fûng-pîn-hiông
- Hokkien POJ: Hong-pin-hiong

Amis name
- Amis: Fakong

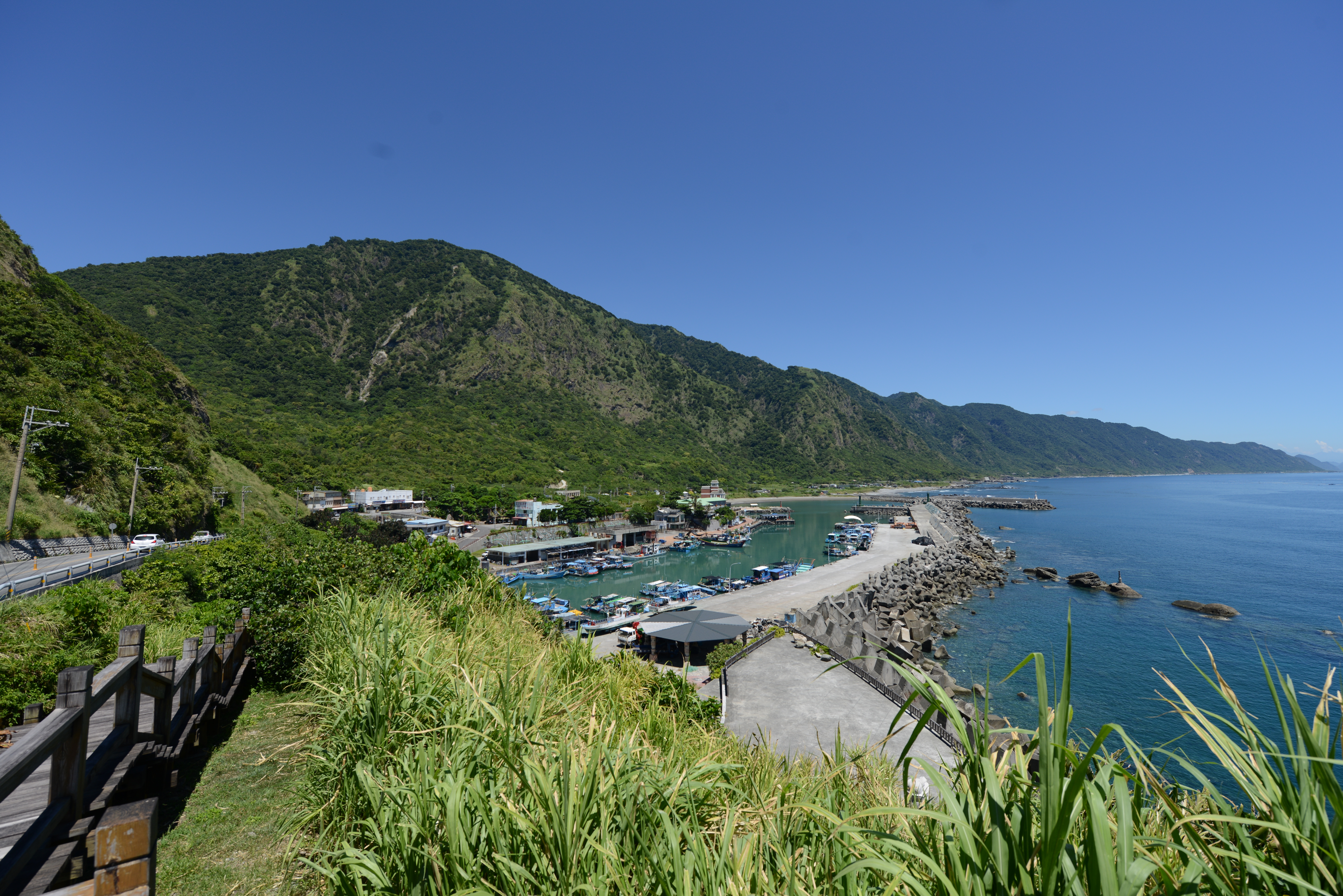
Shitiping Port

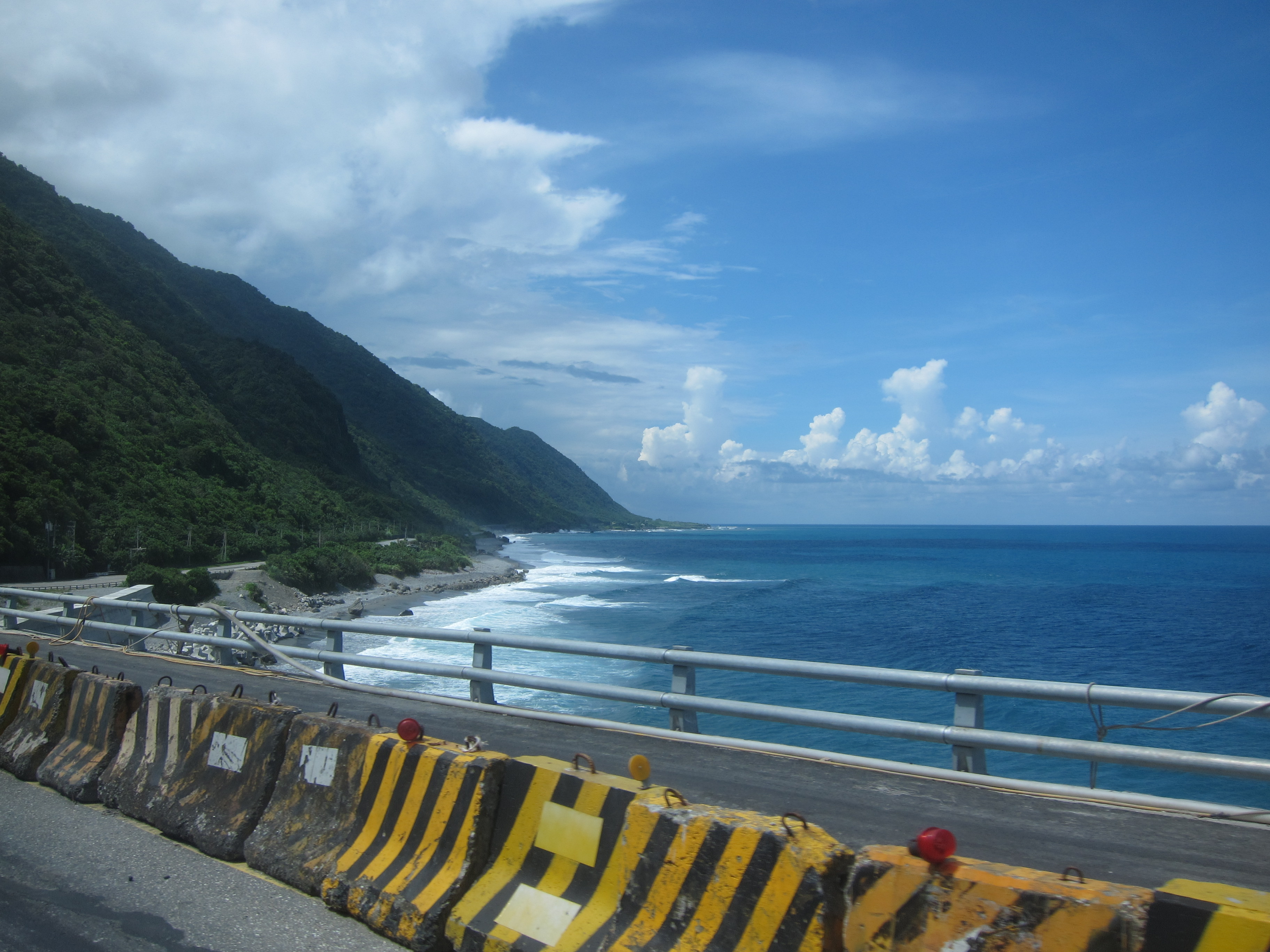
Hualien-Taitung Coastal Highway passing through Fengbin Township

Fengbin Township is a rural township located in Hualien County, Taiwan, bordering Taitung County. The Pacific Ocean lies to the east and the Hai'an Range to the west.

It has the smallest population in Hualien County with around 4,310 inhabitants. The population consists of the indigenous Amis, Kavalan and Sakizaya peoples.

== Administrative divisions ==
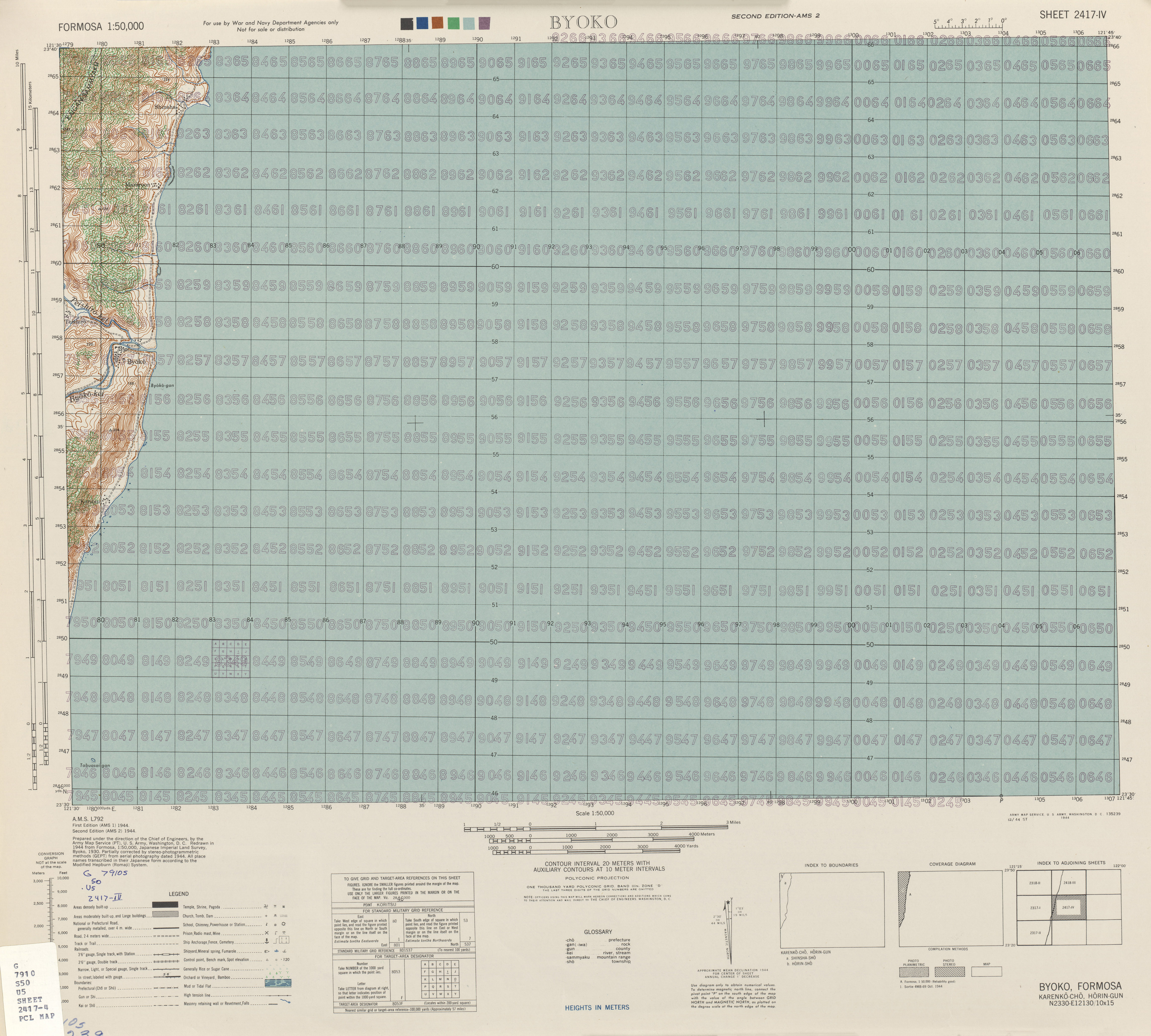
Map of Fengbin (labeled as Byōtō) and surrounding area (1944)

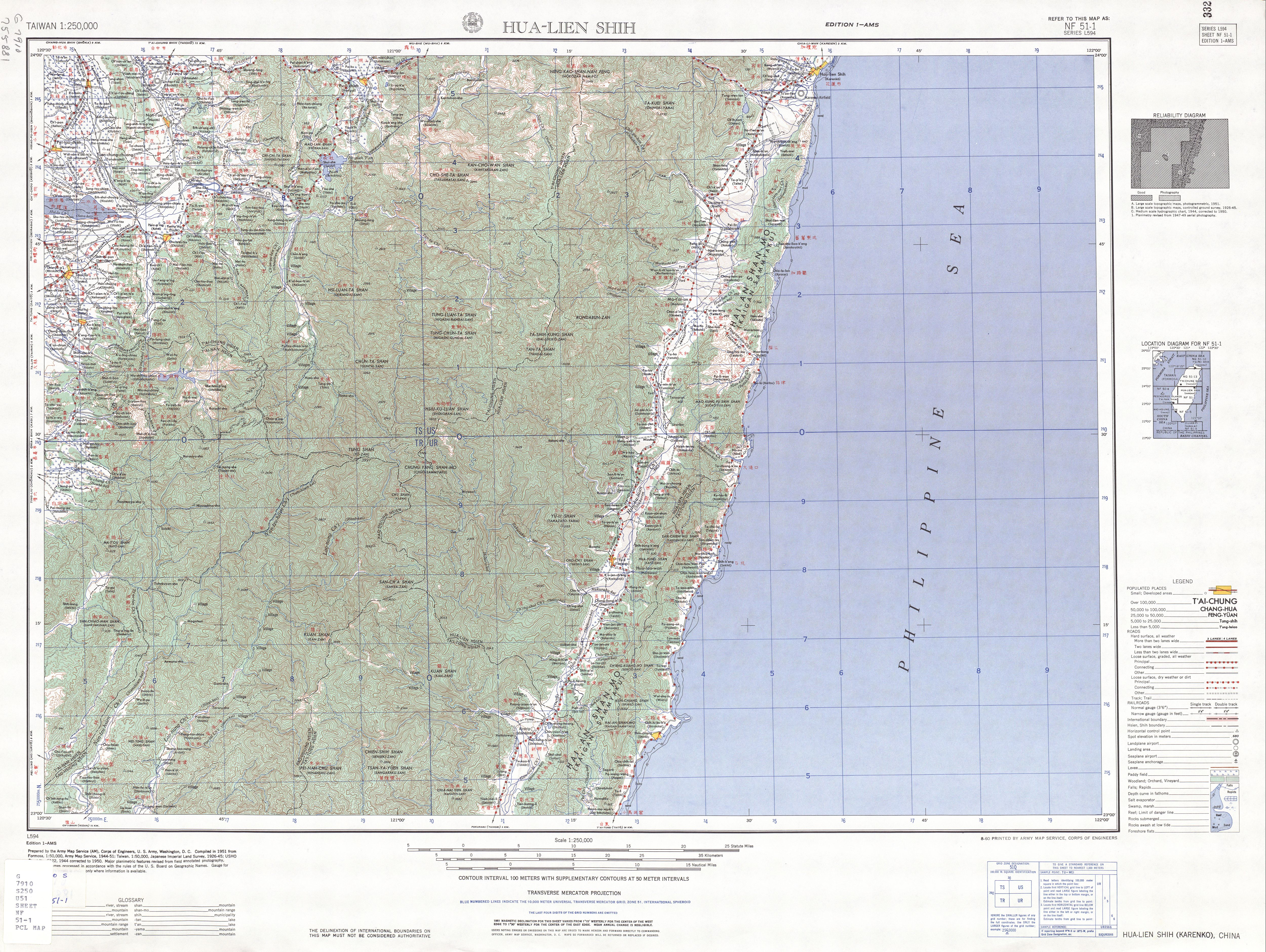
Map including Fenglin (labeled as Mao-kung (Byōtō) 猫公) (1951)

- Jingpu Village
- Gangkou Village
- Fengbin Village
- Xinshe Village
- Jici Village

== Tourist attractions ==
- Taiwan East Coast National Scenic Area
- Xiuguluan River Rafting
- Fengbin Tropic of Cancer Marker
- Jici seaside resort
- Chenghong Bridge Recreation Area
- Shitiping Scenic Area
- Shitiping Port Whale Watching

== Transportation ==
- Provincial Highway No. 11
- Provincial Highway No. 11A
