= Farglory Ocean Park =

Water theme park in Shoufeng, Hualien County, Taiwan

Farglory Ocean Park 遠雄海洋公園
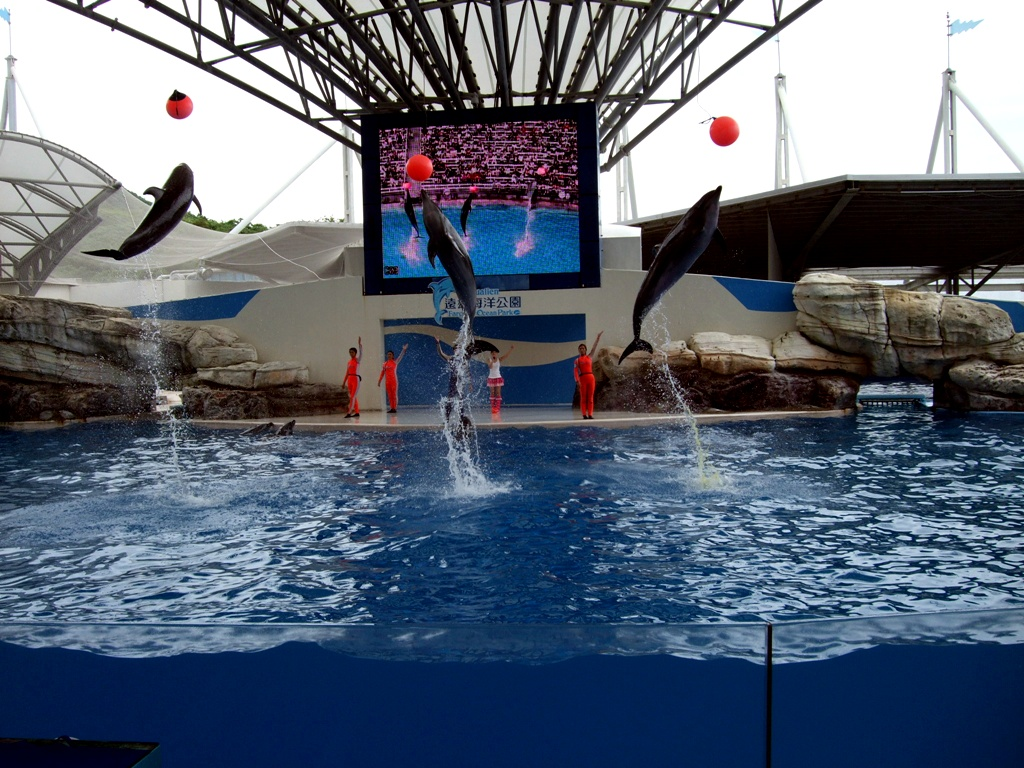
- Interactive map of Farglory Ocean Park 遠雄海洋公園
- Location: Shoufeng, Hualien County, Taiwan
- Coordinates: 23°54′04″N 121°36′05″E
- Theme: water theme park
- Opened: December 2002
- Area: 51 hectare
- Website: Official website

The Farglory Ocean Park (Chinese: 遠雄海洋公園; pinyin: Yuǎnxióng Hǎiyáng Gōngyuán) or Hualien Ocean Park is a water theme park in Yanliao Village, Shoufeng Township, Hualien, Taiwan. It is the first marine theme park in Taiwan.

== History ==
The construction of the theme park started in April 1999 and was completed and opened in December 2002 with a total cost of US$160 million.

== Architecture ==
The theme park spans over an area of 51 hectares, which are generally divided into the marine park and aquarium. The main amusement zones are the Brighton by the Sea, Crystal Castle, Discovery Island, Dolphin Lagoon, Harbor Square, Main Street, Mariner's Cove, and Underwater Kingdom. It also features a cable car.

== Attractions ==
- Dolphin Show
- Fly across the Ocean
- Pirate of El Dorado

== Transportation ==
The park is accessible southeast from Ji'an Station of Taiwan Railway.

== See also ==
- List of tourist attractions in Taiwan
