= Zhixue railway station =

Railway station located in Hualien, Taiwan

Zhixue Station 志學車站
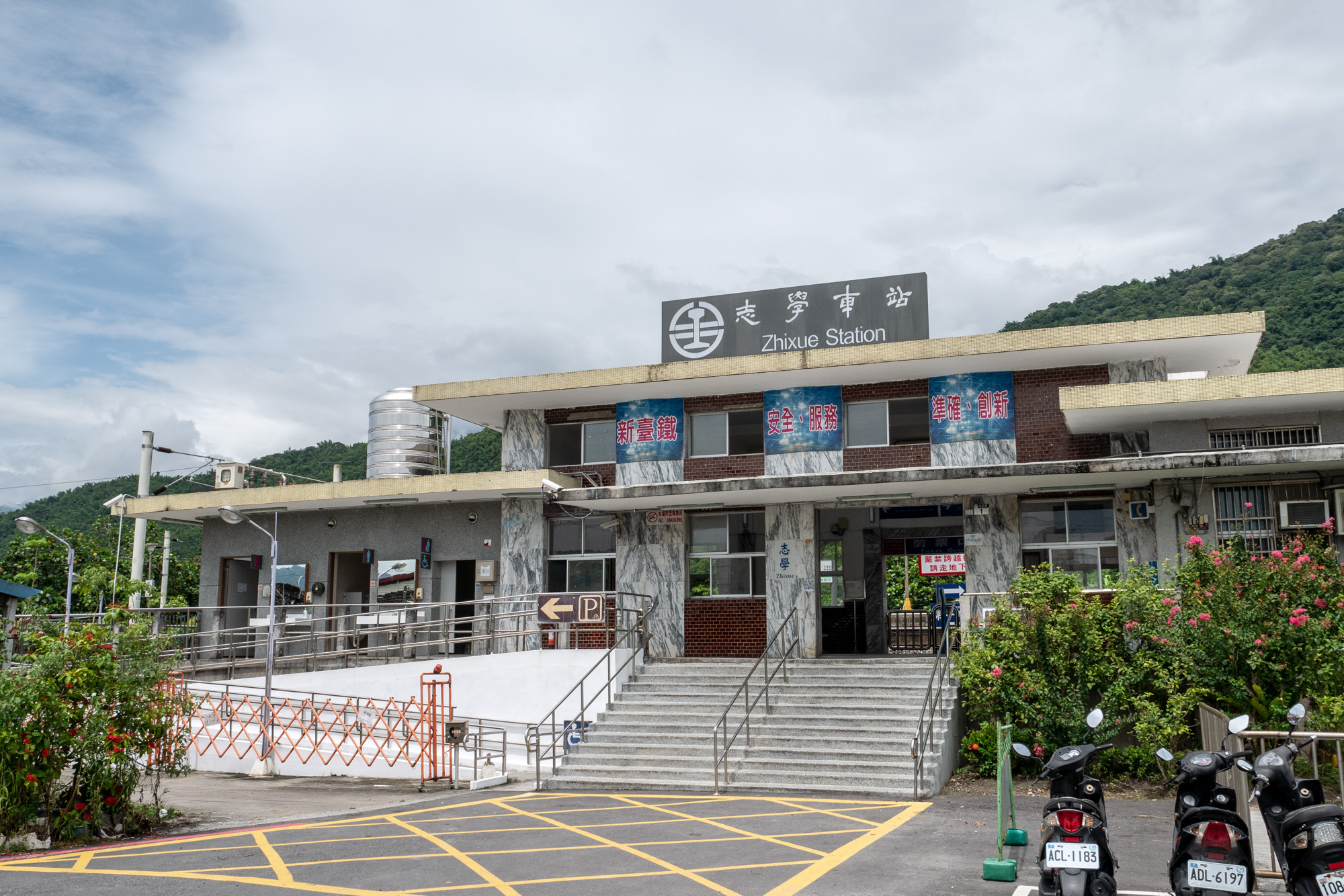
- Station entrance

Chinese name
- Traditional Chinese: 志學車站
Transcriptions
Standard Mandarin
- Hanyu Pinyin: Zhìxué Chēzhàn
- Bopomofo: ㄓˋ ㄒㄩㄝˊ ㄔㄜ ㄓㄢˋ

General information
- Location: Shoufeng, Hualien County, Taiwan
- Coordinates: 23°54′27.3″N 121°31′45.7″E
- System: Taiwan Railway railway station
- Line: Taitung line
- Distance: 12.4 km to Hualien
- Platforms: 2 island platforms

Construction
- Structure type: At-grade

Other information
- Station code: 043

History
- Opened: 25 September 1911

Passengers
- 2017: 112,563 per year
- Rank: 148

Services
Preceding station	Taiwan Railway	Following station
Ji'an towards Badu	Eastern Trunk line	Pinghe towards Taitung
Location

Zhixue railway station (Chinese: 志學車站; pinyin: Zhìxué Chēzhàn) is a railway station located in Shoufeng Township, Hualien County, Taiwan. It is located on the Taitung line and is operated by the Taiwan Railway.

== Surrounding area ==
- National Dong Hwa University
