= Shoufeng railway station =

Railway station in Shoufeng, Hualien County, Taiwan

Shoufeng Station 壽豐車站
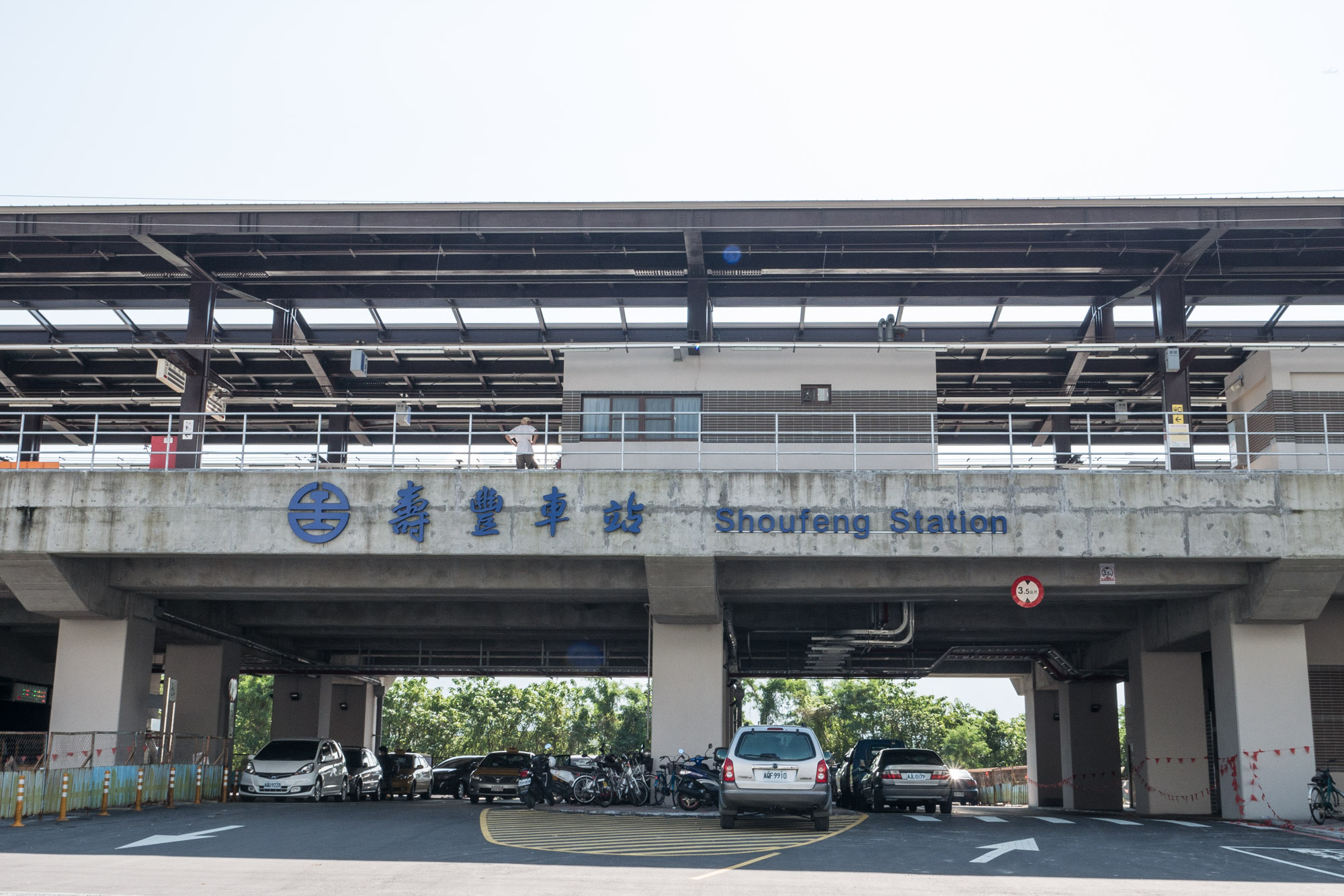

General information
- Location: Shoufeng, Hualien County, Taiwan
- Coordinates: 23°52′08.0″N 121°30′38.8″E
- System: Train station
- Owner: Taiwan Railway
- Operator: Taiwan Railway
- Line: Hualien–Taitung
- Train operators: Taiwan Railway Corporation

History
- Opened: 16 December 1910

Passengers
- 697 daily (2024)

Services
Preceding station	Taiwan Railway	Following station
Pinghe towards Badu	Eastern Trunk line	Fengtian towards Taitung
Location

Shoufeng (traditional Chinese: 壽豐車站; simplified Chinese: 寿丰车站; pinyin: Shòufēng Chēzhàn) is a railway station on Taiwan Railway Hualien–Taitung line located in Shoufeng Township, Hualien County, Taiwan.

== History ==
The station was opened on 16 December 1910.

== See also ==
- List of railway stations in Taiwan
