= Taitung line =

Railway line in Taiwan

Taitung Line

Overview
- Native name: 臺東線
- Owner: Taiwan Railway Corporation
- Termini: Hualien; Taitung
- Stations: 27

Service
- Type: Passenger/freight rail
- Operator(s): Taiwan Railway Corporation

History
- Opened: 25 March 1926

Technical
- Line length: 150.9 km (93.8 mi)
- Number of tracks: 2
- Track gauge: 3 ft 6 in (1,067 mm)
- Electrification: 25 kV/60 Hz Catenary
- Operating speed: 130 km/h (81 mph)

The Taitung line(Chinese: 臺東線; pinyin: Táidōng Xiàn; Pe̍h-ōe-jī: Tâi-tang Soàⁿ), also known as the Hua-Tung line (Chinese: 花東線; pinyin: Huādōng Xiàn; Pe̍h-ōe-jī: Hoa-tang Soàⁿ), is the southern section of the Eastern line of Taiwan Railway. The line starts at the Hualien station and ends at the Taitung station. It is 161.5 km long, including the main segment of 155.7 km between Hualien and Taitung.

The coastal branch lines of Hualien and Taitung were discarded after the broadening plan in 1982. The broadcasts of the station names on Taitung line are made in five languages: Mandarin, Taiwanese Hokkien, Hakka, English, and Amis. The Taitung line is the only line in Taiwan where broadcasts are made in the Amis language.

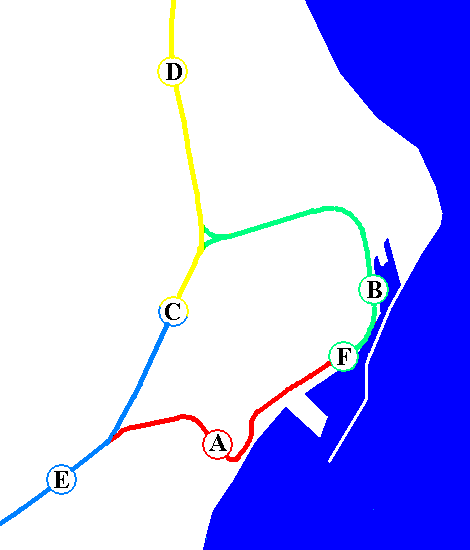
Outline map near Hualien, stations: A: Hualien (former), B: Hualien Port, C: Hualien, D: Beipu, E: Ji'an, F: Meilun Lines: Yellow: North-Link Line Blue:Hualien–Taitung Line Green: Hualien Port line Red: Hualien Port line (former)

== History ==
The north segment from Karenkō (花蓮港, now Hualien City) to Poshiko (璞石閣 ポシコ, then Tamazato, now Yuli) was built in 1909 and completed in 1917. The south segment from Hinan (卑南, then Taitō, now Taitung City) to Rirō (里巄, now Guanshan) was opened in 1919 by the Taitō Development Company (臺東開拓株式會社).

In 1922, the Taitō Development Company bought the railroad from Karenkō to Tamazato and named it the "Taitō North line", while the south segment from Taitō to Rirō was named the "Taitō South line."

The construction of the connecting railway between Tamazato to Rirō began in 1921 and completed in 1926, after which the total length of the line from Karenkō (Hualien City) to Taitō (Taitung City) was 171.8 km.

In 1966, the Kuang-Hua Express (光華號), utilizing diesel multiple units, started service on the line, and greatly shortening the travel time from Hualien to Taitung from 6–7 hours to 3–4 hours.

Its gauge was changed from 2 ft 6 in (762 mm) narrow gauge to 3 ft 6 in (1,067 mm) gauge in 1982 and connected with North-link line, after which the old Hualien Station was abandoned and replaced by the Hualien railway station that is used now. The site of old Hualian Station was eventually turned into Dongdamen Night Market in 2015, while the disused right of way has been partially turned into a pedestrian area.

In 2007, the Environmental Protection Administration gave the line a conditional pass for an electrification project, which would boost the operating speed from 110 km/h to 130 km/h. In 2009, construction began on electrification work, with NT$15.5 billion set aside for the project. Electrification work was completed in late 2013, with the inauguration of electric services taking place in late June 2014.

The section between Nanping and Wanrong railway stations was to be upgraded from a single-track railway to a dual-track railway and was expected to be completed by December 2020. With the existing double-track sections from Shoufeng to Nanping railway station and from Wanrong to Guangfu railway stations, it was expected that service frequency could be improved, shortening wait times.

On 12 October 2020, the Ministry of Transport has approved and intends to carry out upgrading works on the Taitung line to ensure that the entire line is double-tracked. As 69% of the line is still currently single-tracked, the project is expected to shorten wait times by up to 90 minutes with up to 16 more train services each day. Some trips can be reduced by up to 50 minutes. With an increase of 17,000 passengers per day, the dual-track railway project is expected to cost NT$25.429 billion, which will be completed 7 years after the environmental impact assessment and comprehensive planning are approved.

The Railway Bureau has stated that the project will be carried out in 2 phases. Phase 1 will include the sections north of Yuli (Hualien - Shoufeng, Guangfu - Ruisui and Sanmin - Yuli) and the section between Taitung and Zhiben and is expected to be completed by 2026. Phase 2 will include the remaining sections of the line and is expected to be completed by 2027.

== Electrification of the Hualien-Taitung line ==
Together with the electrification of the Hualien-Taitung line, the following stations were upgraded.

- General reconstruction
  - Completed - Zhixue, Pinghe, Fengtian, Nanping, Fenglin, Wanrong, Guangfu, Dafu, Fuyuan, Ruisui, Sanmin, Yuli, Dongli, Dongzhu, Fuli, Chishang, Haiduan, Guanshan, Ruihe, Ruiyuan, Luye, Shanli, Taitung
- Elevated station
  - Under construction - Hualien
  - Under planning - Ji’an
  - Completed - Shoufeng
- Underground station
  - Completed - Linrong Shin Kong

== Stations ==
Name	Chinese	Taiwanese	Hakka	Amis	Dist. (km)	Transfers and notes	Location	
Hualien	花蓮	Hoa-liân	Fâ-lièn	Kalingko	0.0	→ North-link line	Hualien	Hualien; County
Ji'an	吉安	Kiat-an	Kit-ôn	Yoshino	3.4		Ji'an	Hualien; County
Zhixue	志學	Chì-ha̍k	Chṳ-ho̍k	Cihak	12.4		Shoufeng	Hualien; County
Pinghe	平和	Pêng-hô	Phìn-fò	Ci’adetuman	15.3		Shoufeng	Hualien; County
Shoufeng	壽豐	Siū-hong	Su-fûng	Rinahem	17.2		Shoufeng	Hualien; County
Fengtian	豐田	Hong-tiân	Fûng-thièn	Telu’	19.9		Shoufeng	Hualien; County
Linrong Shin Kong	林榮新光	Lîm-êng Sin-kong	Lìm-yùng Sîn-kông		26.1		Fenglin	Hualien; County
Nanping	南平	Lâm-pêng	Nàm-phìn	Kiku	28.3		Fenglin	Hualien; County
Fenglin	鳳林	Hōng-lîm	Fung-lìm	Cingaroan	32.5		Fenglin	Hualien; County
Wanrong	萬榮	Bān-êng	Van-yùng	Molisaka	37.3		Fenglin	Hualien; County
Guangfu	光復	Kong-ho̍k	Kông-fu̍k	Fata’an	42.9		Guangfu	Hualien; County
Dafu	大富	Tāi-hô	Thai-fu	Yamato	50.6		Guangfu	Hualien; County
Fuyuan	富源	Hù-goân	Fu-ngièn	Pa’ilasen	53.6		Ruisui	Hualien; County
Ruisui	瑞穗	Sūi-sūi	Lui-sui	Kohkoh	62.8		Ruisui	Hualien; County
Sanmin	三民	Sam-bîn	Sâm-mìn	Takay	72.1		Yuli	Hualien; County
Yuli	玉里	Gio̍k-lí	Ngiu̍k-lî	Posko	83.1		Yuli	Hualien; County
Dongli	東里	Tang-lí	Tûng-lî	Pasai	89.8		Fuli	Hualien; County
Dongzhu	東竹	Tang-tek	Tûng-chuk	Talampo	95.7		Fuli	Hualien; County
Fuli	富里	Hù-lí	Fu-lî	Kumpuu	101.9		Fuli	Hualien; County
Chishang	池上	Tî-siōng	Chhṳ̀-sông	Fanaw	108.8		Chishang	Taitung; County
Haiduan	海端	Hái-toan	Gói-tôn	Haitutuan	114.4		Guanshan	Taitung; County
Guanshan	關山	Koan-san	Koân-sân	Takofan	120.9		Guanshan	Taitung; County
Ruihe	瑞和	Suī-hô	Lui-fò	Pakala’ac	128.3		Luye	Taitung; County
Ruiyuan	瑞源	Suī-goân	Lui-ngièn	Efong	131.1		Luye	Taitung; County
Luye	鹿野	Lo̍k-iá	Lu̍k-yâ	Parayabay	136.6		Luye	Taitung; County
Shanli	山里	San-lí	Sân-lî	Kalito’od	142.8		Beinan	Taitung; County
Taitung	臺東	Tâi-tang	Thòi-tûng	Posong	150.9	→ South-link line	Taitung	Taitung; County
