= Shoufeng =

Coordinates: 23°52′N 121°31′E

Shoufeng Township 壽豐鄉 Kotobuki
- Rural township
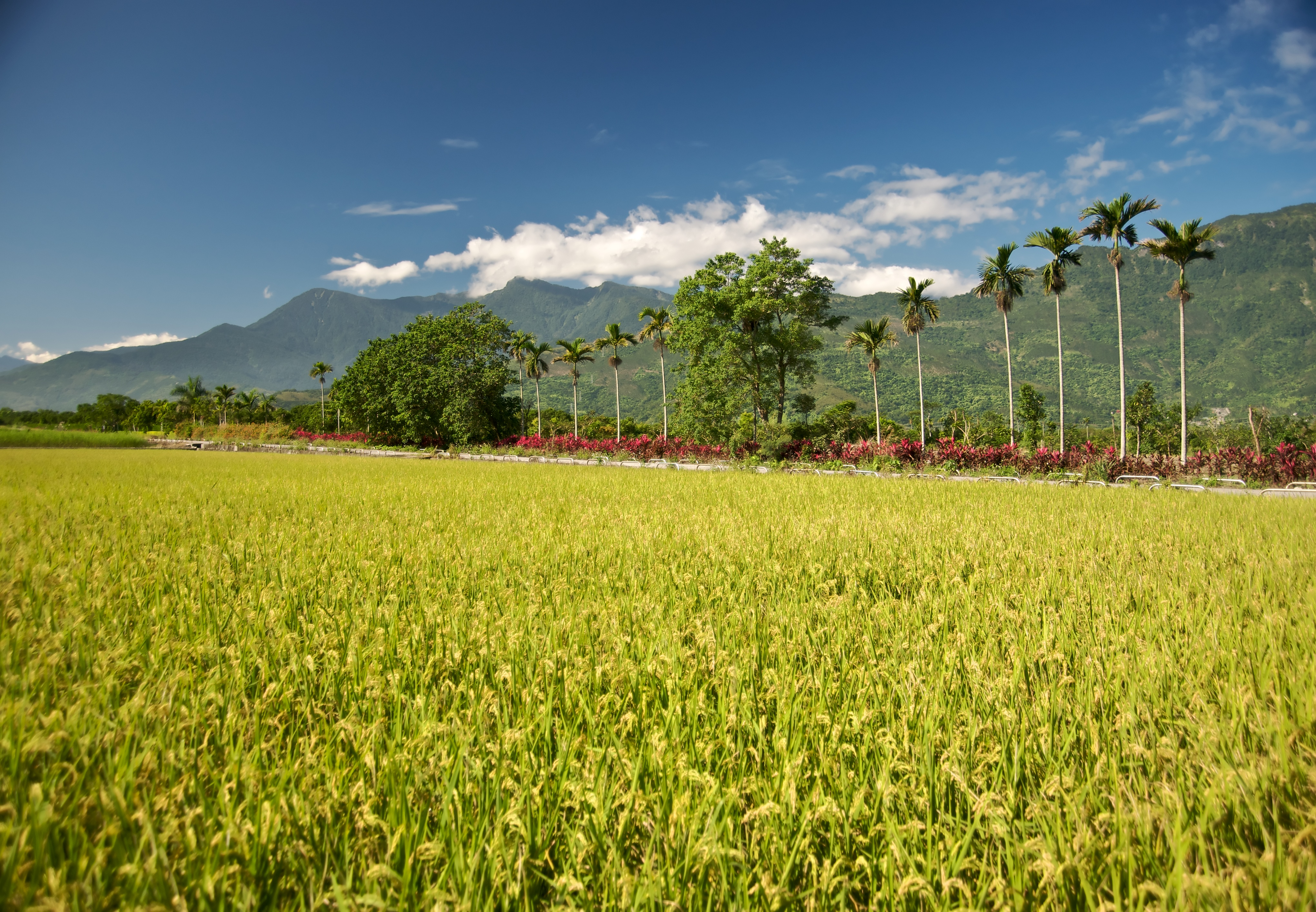
- Rice Paddy with the Coastal Mountain Range in the background

- Shoufeng Township in Hualien County
- Location: Hualien County, Taiwan

Area
  - Total: 218 km^{2} (84 sq mi)

Population (March 2023)
  - Total: 17,106
  - Density: 78.5/km^{2} (203/sq mi)

Shoufeng Township

Chinese name
- Chinese: 壽豐鄉
- Hanyu Pinyin: Shòufēng Xiāng
- Wade–Giles: Shou^{4}-feng^{1} Hsiang^{1}
- Pha̍k-fa-sṳ: Su-fûng-hiông
- Hokkien POJ: Siū-hong-hiong

Amis name
- Amis: Rinahem

Shoufeng Township is a rural Township in Hualien County, Taiwan. The township sits in the north segment of East Rift Valley between Taiwan's Central Range and Coastal Mountain Range near the Pacific Ocean. The Township is best known as home to National Dong Hwa University (NDHU), a national research university and famous tourist attraction in Eastern Taiwan, where is Taiwan's representative university town.

== Geography ==
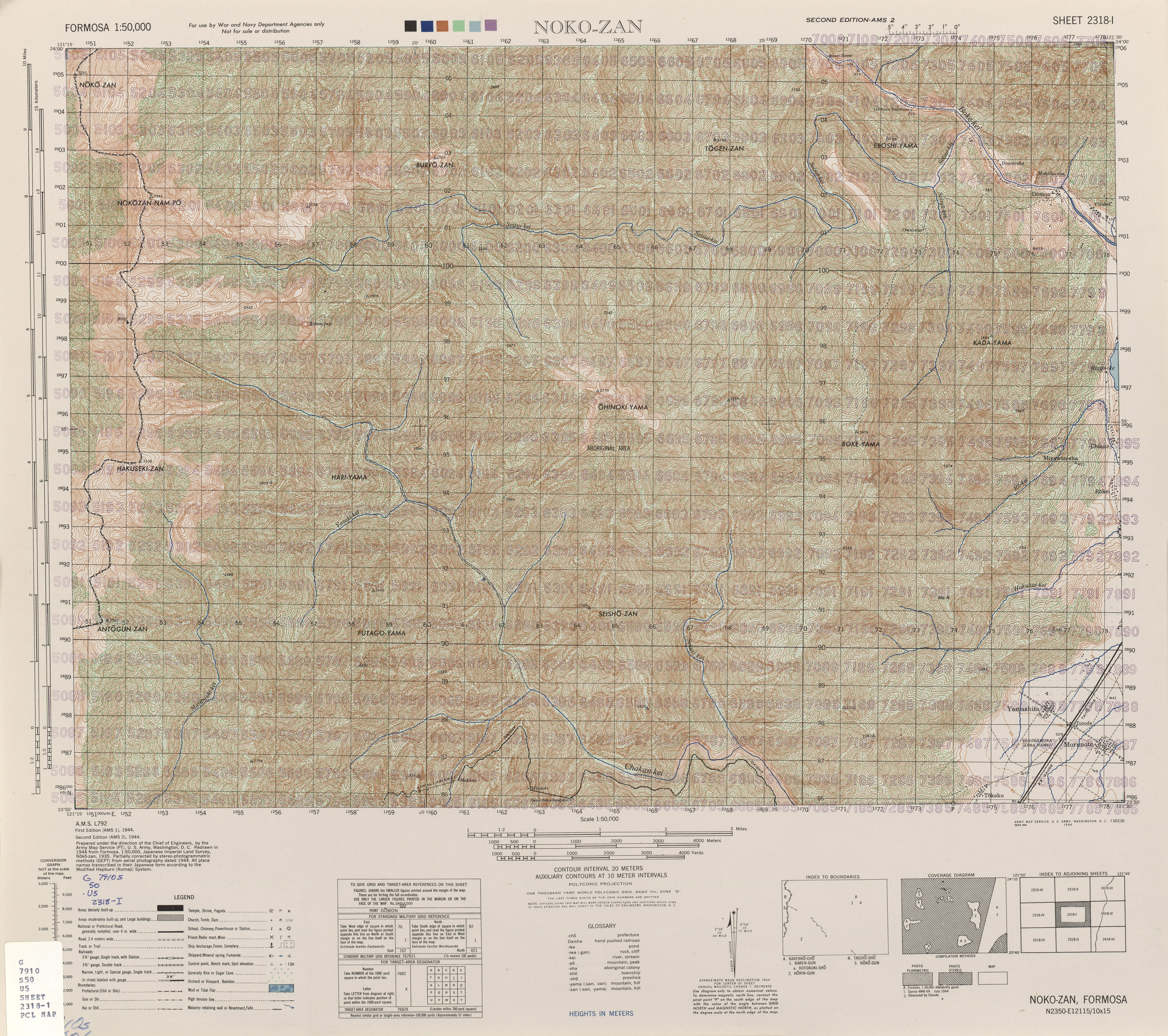
Map of western Shoufeng area (1944)

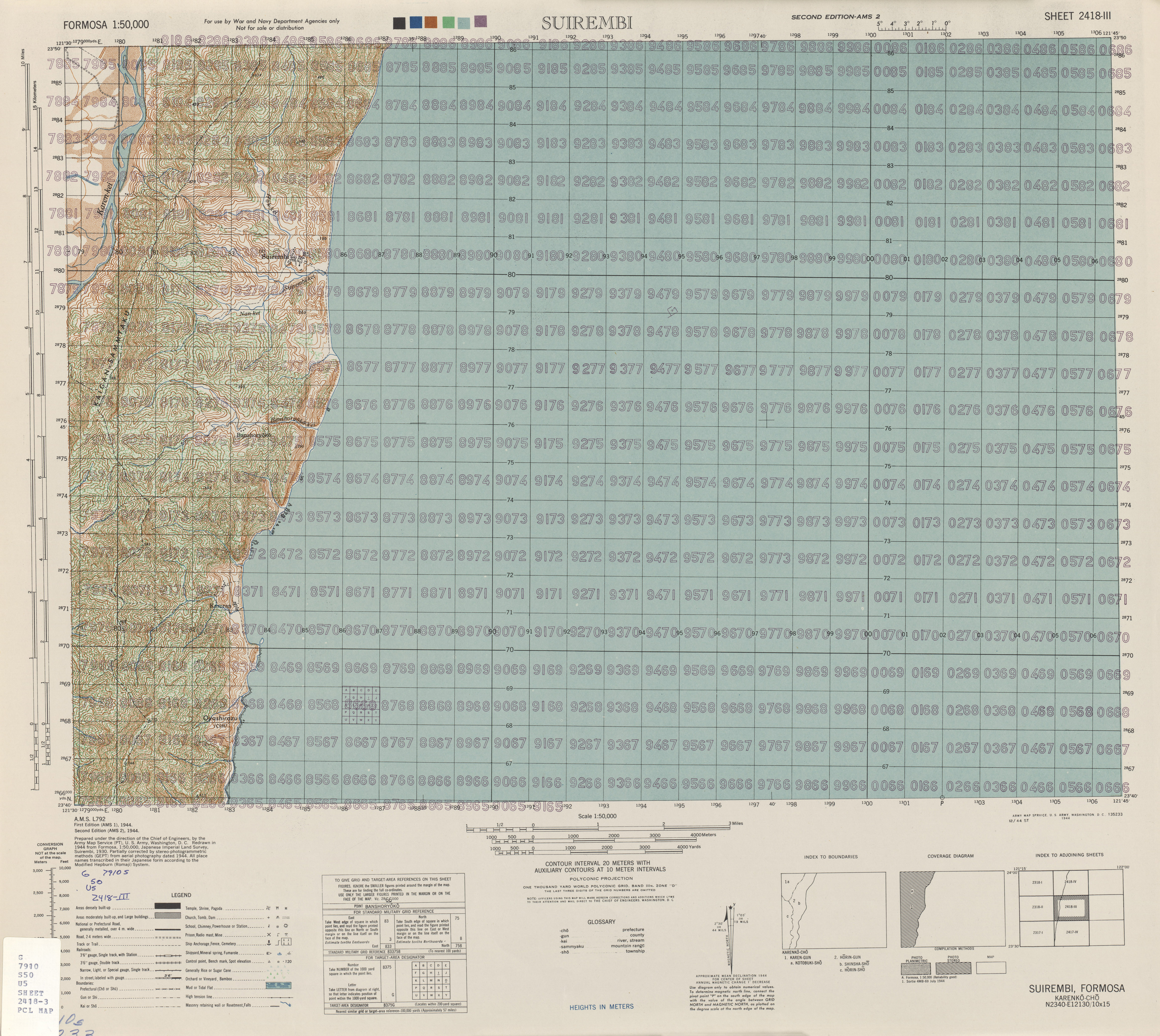
Map of southern Shoufeng area (1944)

A large part of the township is located centered on the Huadong Valley north of where the Shoufeng River empties into the Hualien River. The township extends eastward over the Hai'an Range to the Pacific Ocean in the east.

== Administrative divisions ==
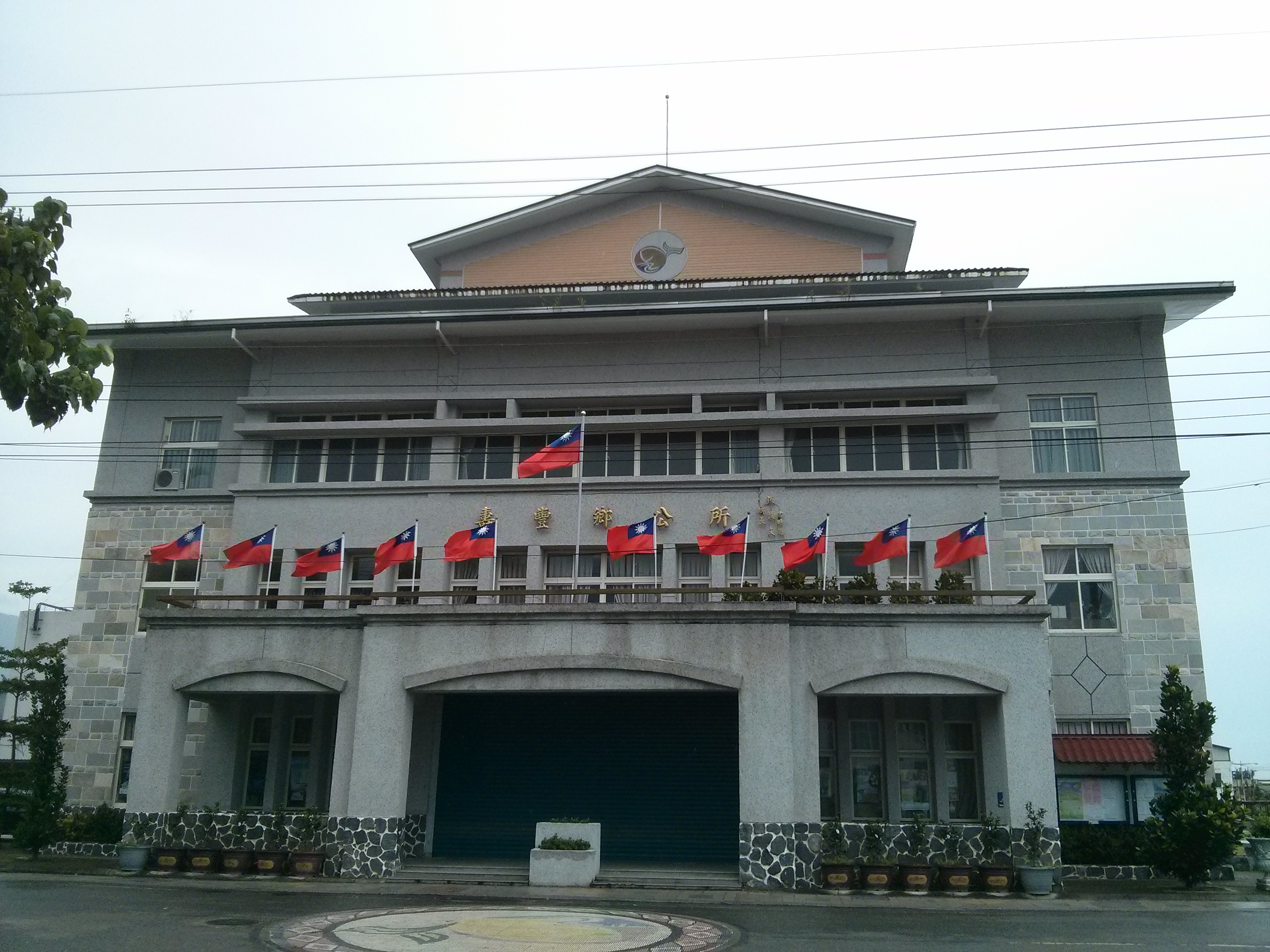
Shoufeng Township Office

The township comprises 15 villages: Chinan, Fengli, Fengping, Fengshan, Gonghe, Guangrong, Mizhan, Pinghe, Shoufeng, Shuhu, Shuilian, Xikou, Yanliao, Yuemei and Zhixue.

== Demographics ==
It has 17,106 inhabitants in 7,376 households.

== Education ==
=== Higher education ===
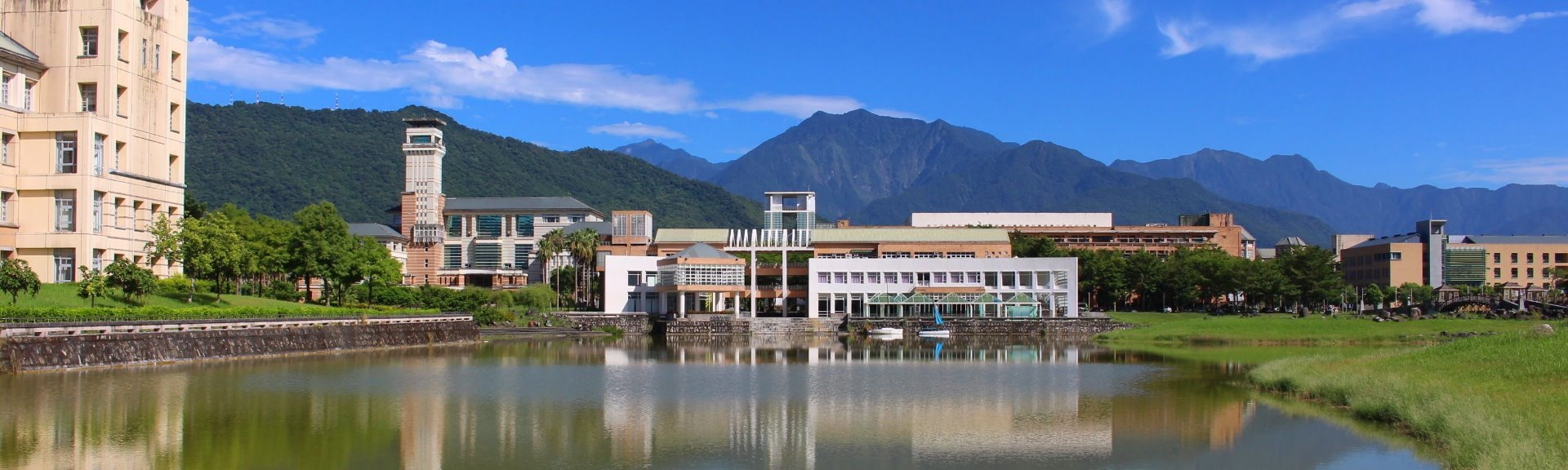
National Dong Hwa University Campus View

The National Dong Hwa University dominates the township of Shoufeng, providing the township with its distinctive college-town character. University buildings are located in the north of the township and the campus is directly adjacent to the Zhixue Street, Papaya Creek Delta, and Zhixue Railway Station.

=== Mandarin education ===
- National Dong Hwa University Chinese Language Center

== Tourist attractions ==
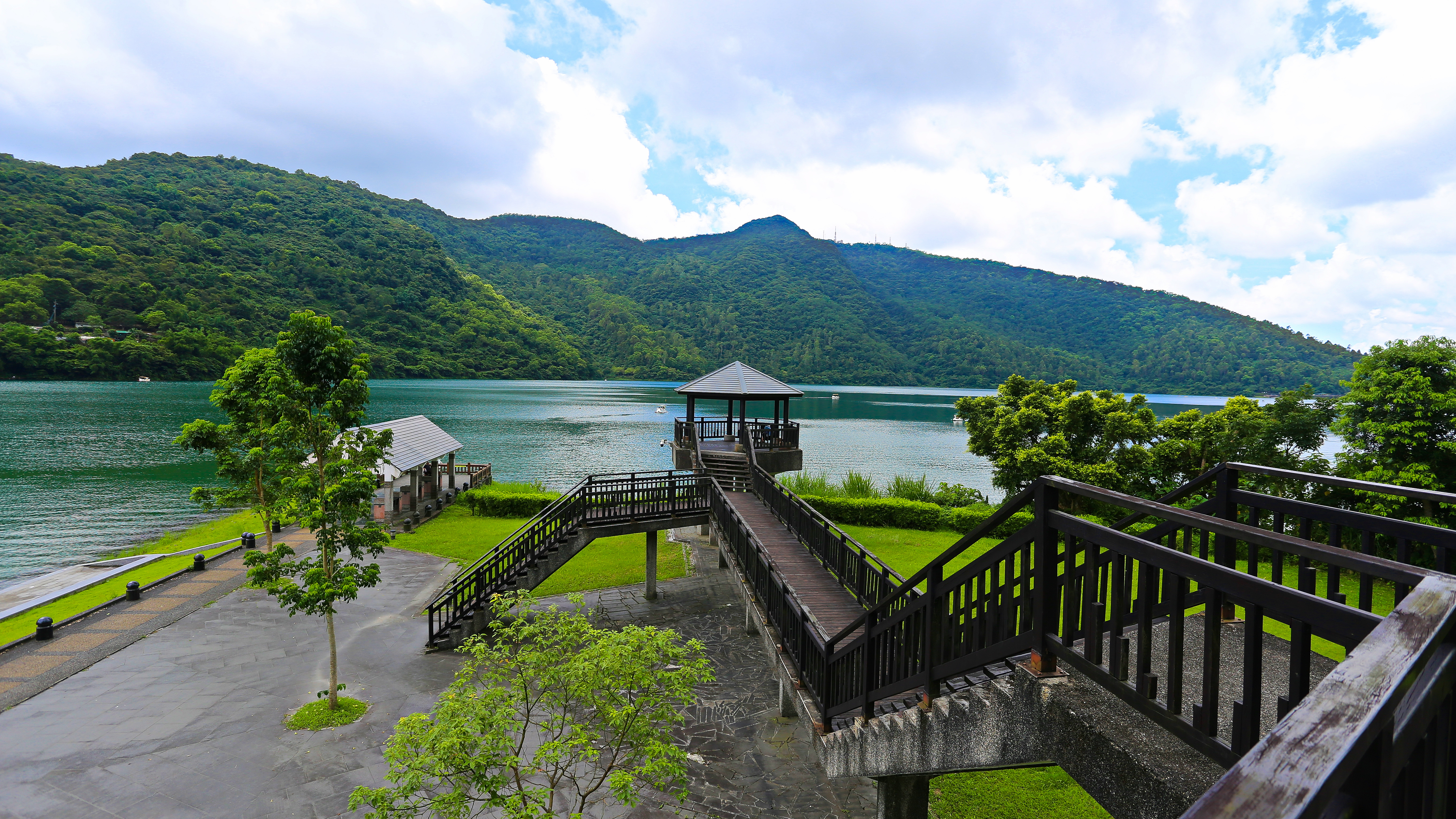
Liyu Lake

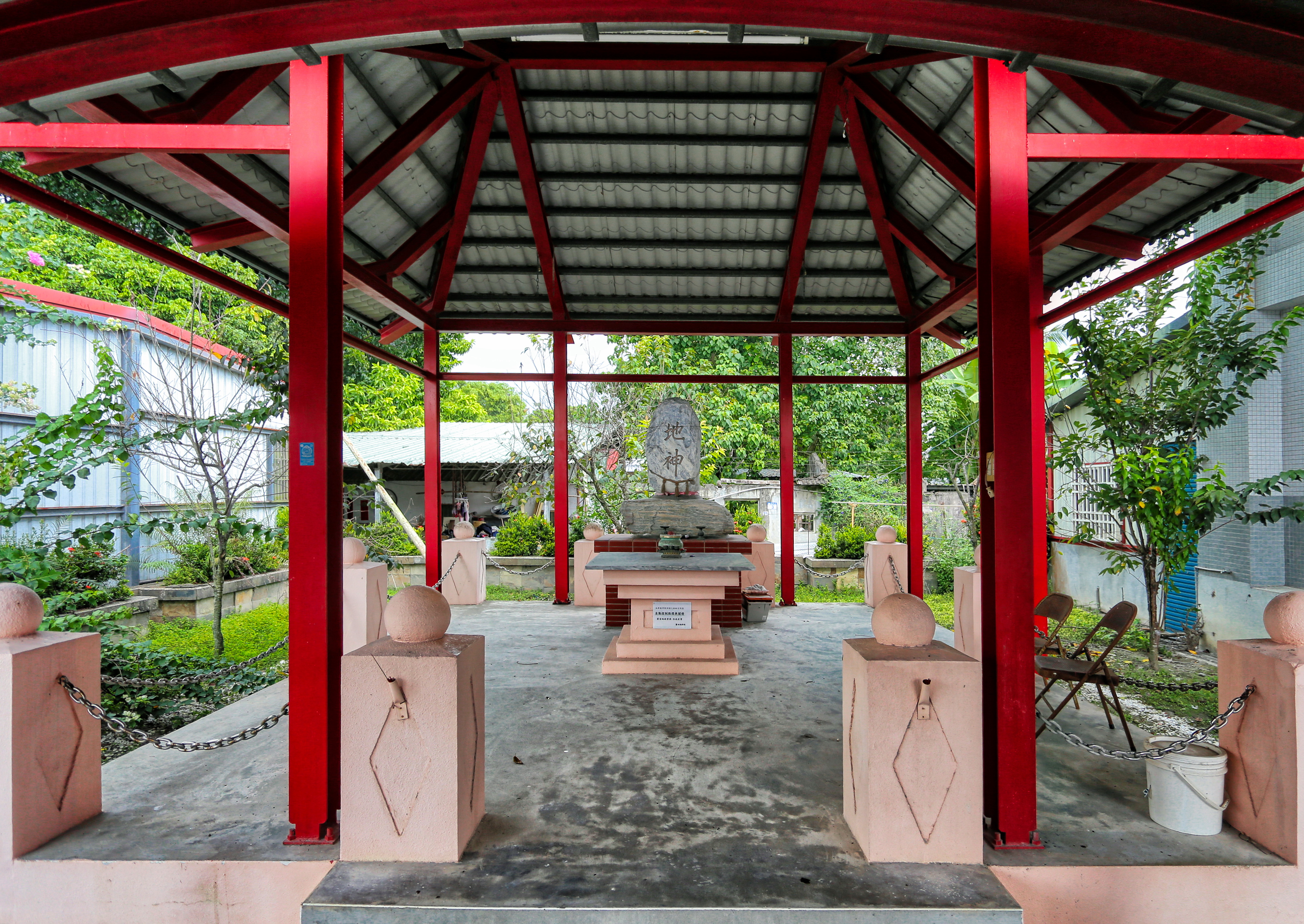
Land Deity

- Taroko National Park
- East Rift Valley National Scenic Area
- East Coast National Scenic Area
- Liyu Lake
- Honan Temple
- Niushan Hunting Reserved Area
- Lichuan Fishing Farm
- Farglory Ocean Park
- Chihnan National Forest
- Fengtian Immigrant Village

== Transportation ==
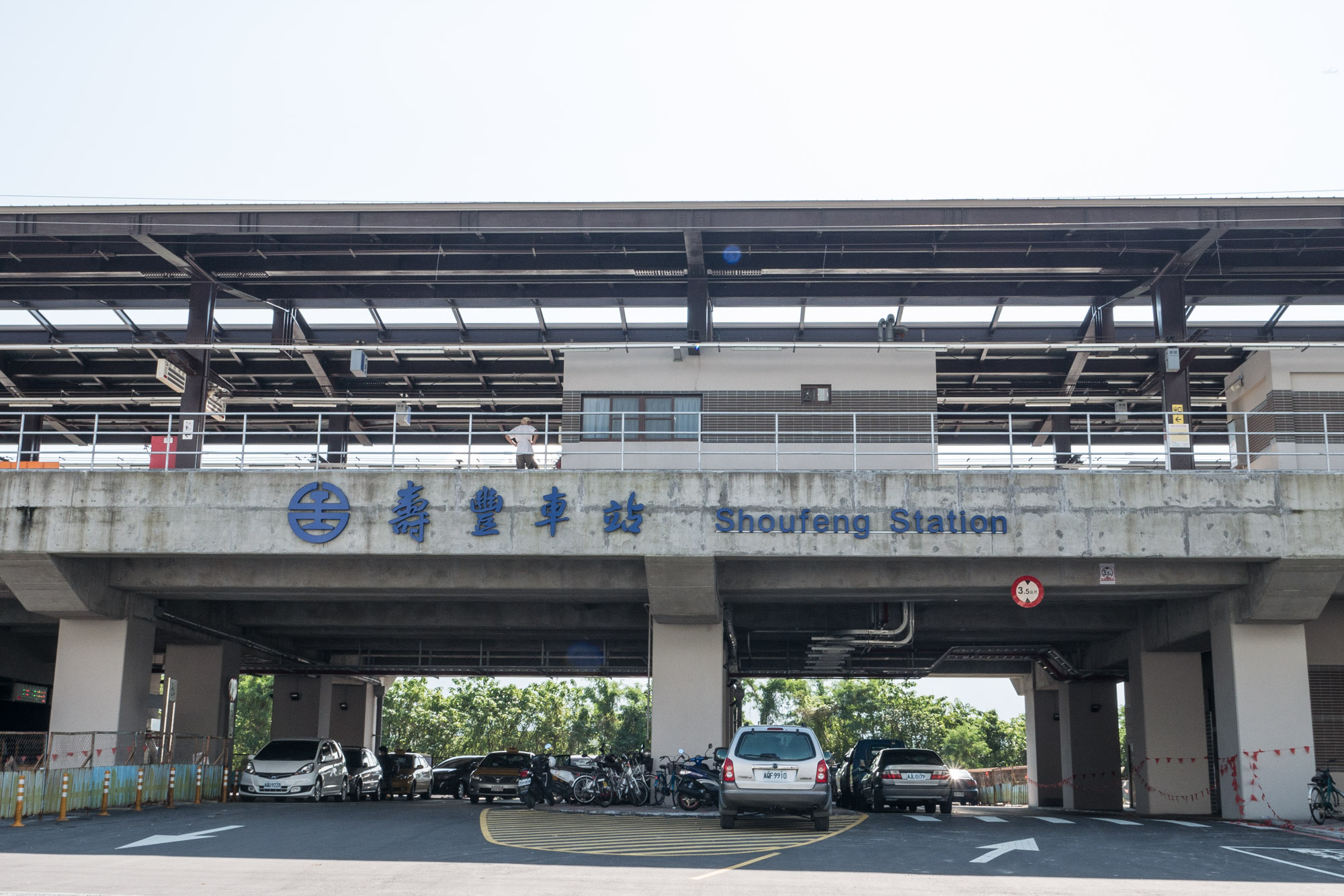
Shoufeng Station on the Hualien–Taitung Line

Taiwan Railway stations on the Taitung line in Shoufeng include:

- Zhixue Station
- Pinghe Station
- Shoufeng Station
- Fengtian Station

Highways in Shoufeng include:

- Provincial Highway 9, a north-south route through the Huadong Valley
- Provincial Highway 9C, (9丙), a north-south alternative route to PH 9
- Provincial Highway 11, a north-south route along the Pacific coast
- Provincial Highway 11C (11丙), a north-south route connecting National Dong Hwa University with PH 9 and PH 11.
- County Road 193, along the east bank of the Hualien River
