= Ji'an railway station (Taiwan) =

Railway station located in Hualien, Taiwan

Ji'an Station 吉安車站
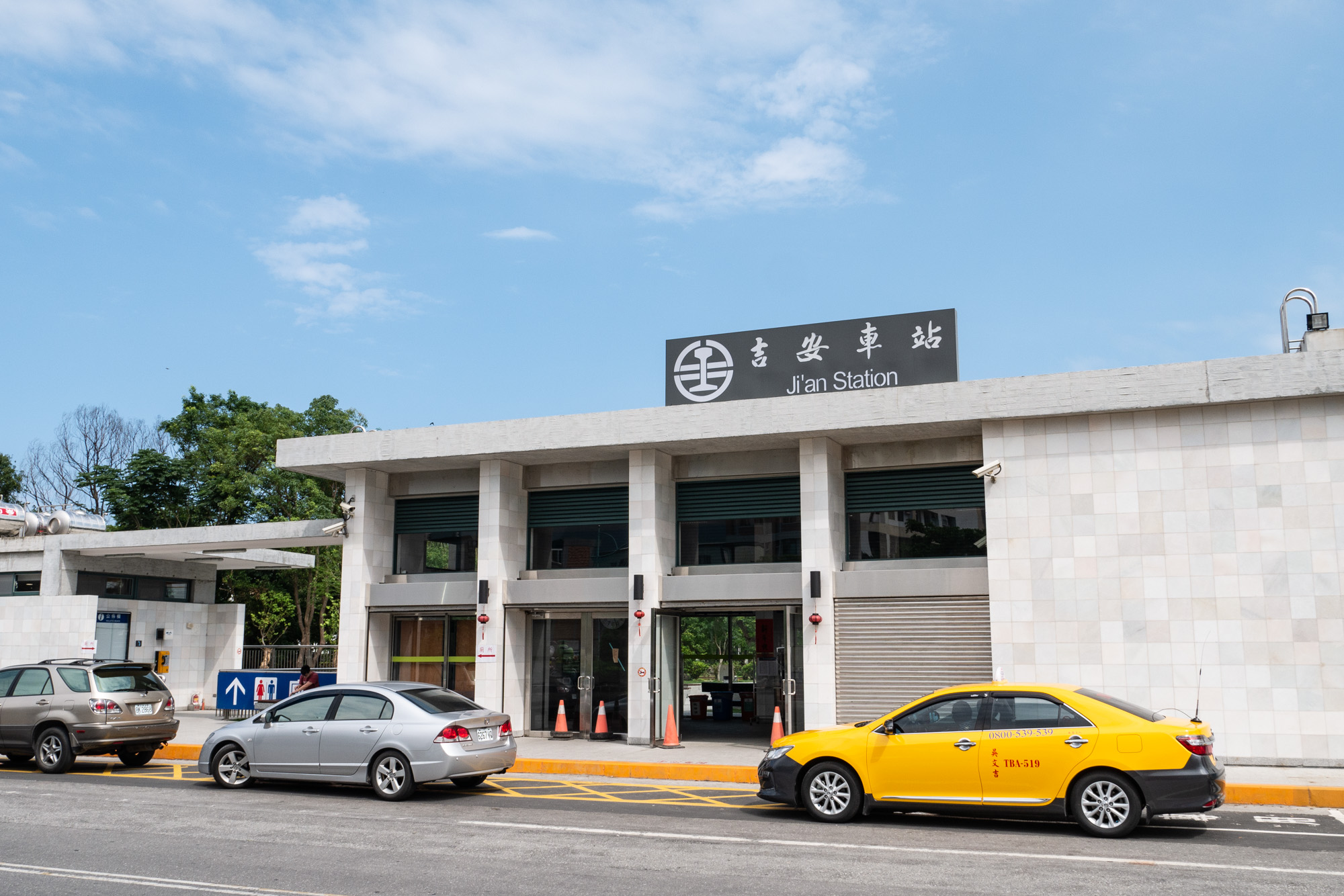

Chinese name
- Traditional Chinese: 吉安車站
Transcriptions
Standard Mandarin
- Hanyu Pinyin: Jíān Chēzhàn
- Bopomofo: ㄐㄧˊ ㄢ ㄔㄜ ㄓㄢˋ

General information
- Location: Ji'an, Hualien County; Taiwan
- Coordinates: 23°58′05.2″N 121°34′57.6″E
- System: Taiwan Railway railway station
- Line: Taitung line
- Distance: 3.4 km to Hualien
- Platforms: 1 island platform 1 side platform

Construction
- Structure type: At-grade

Other information
- Station code: 043

History
- Opened: 29 January 1914

Passengers
- 2017: 135,034 per year
- Rank: 142

Services
| Preceding station | Taiwan Railway | Following station |
|---|---|---|
| Hualien towards Badu | Eastern Trunk line | Zhixue towards Taitung |
Location

Ji'an railway station (Chinese: 吉安車站; pinyin: Jíān Chēzhàn) is a railway station located in Ji'an Township, Hualien County, Taiwan. It is located on the Taitung line and is operated by the Taiwan Railway.
