= Wuling (mountain pass) =

Mountain Pass in Ren'ai, Taiwan

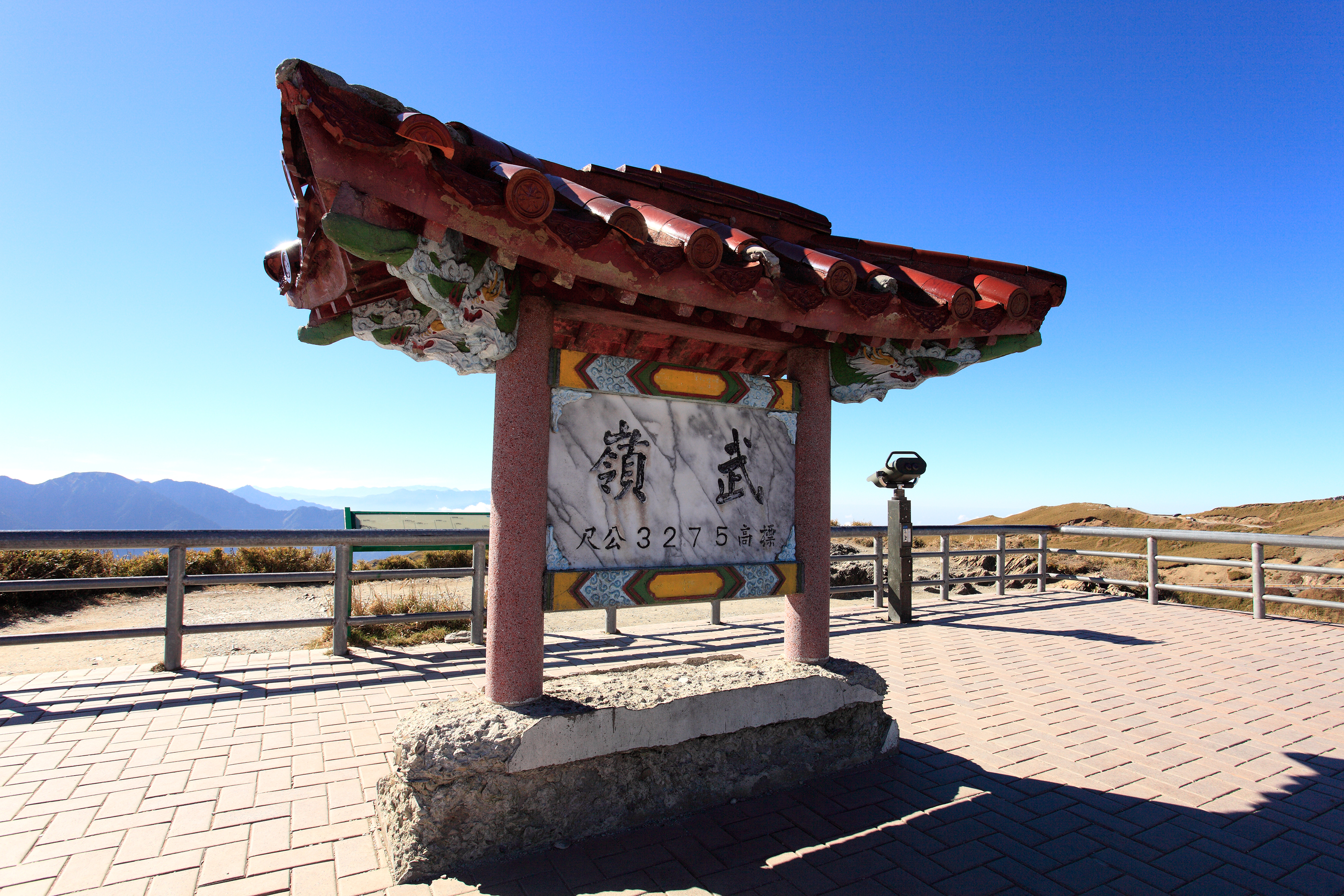
- Sign on the observation deck

- Location within Taiwan
- Elevation: 3,275 metres (10,745 ft)
- Traversed by: Provincial Highway 14A

Third Approach
- Location: Ren'ai, Nantou, Taiwan
- Range: Central Mountain Range
- Coordinates: 24°08′14″N 121°16′33″E

Wuling (Chinese: 武嶺; pinyin: Wǔlǐng, el 3275 m), formerly known as Sakuma Pass (佐久間峠, Sakuma-tōge), is a mountain pass located in Ren'ai, Nantou, Taiwan, transversing the Central Mountain Range near the peak of Hehuanshan within Taroko National Park. It is the highest paved road in elevation in Taiwan.

== History ==
Originally, a trail was built by the Atayal people at the same location. During the Japanese occupation of Taiwan, the Governor-General of Taiwan, Sakuma Samata, ordered the construction of a road through the same trail as part of the Five years plan to governing aborigines to better transport supplies in the Truku War. The pass was named "Sakuma Pass" in the general's honor.

After the change of governance to the Kuomintang, the Nationalist government continued to work on the highway. Chiang Kai-shek visited the highway, renaming the site as "Wuling". Since the Central Cross-Island Highway is closed due to typhoon damage, Wuling became the only route in the area transversing the Central Mountain Range.

== Recreation ==
Wuling is a popular destination for road cycling. The three possible routes include:

- From the east (85 km, 3,215 m elevation): Beginning in Taroko Gorge, the route follows Highway 8 to Dayuling, where the route turns south to the peak. Regarded as the toughest route of the three.
- From the west (53 km, 2,800 m elevation): Beginning in Puli, Nantou, the route follows Highway 14 and 14A through Qingjing Farm.
- From the north (62 km, 2,300 m elevation): Beginning in Wuling Farm, the route follows Highway 7A to Lishan, where it takes Provincial Highway 8 to Dayuling, then 14A to the peak.

Many races are held to ride to Wuling, most notably the Taiwan KOM Challenge, a non-UCI sanctioned race beginning in Qixingtan Beach and following the eastern route. The 107 km race is regarded as an intense climb within the cycling community, with Grand Tour winner Vincenzo Nibali commenting: "I've never ridden such a long and hard climb before in my entire life."

Wuling is also a popular stargazing and bird-watching location. Common birds include the Taiwan rosefinch, white-whiskered laughingthrush, and collared bush robin.

== Gallery ==
View of Wuling from the peak of Hehuanshan

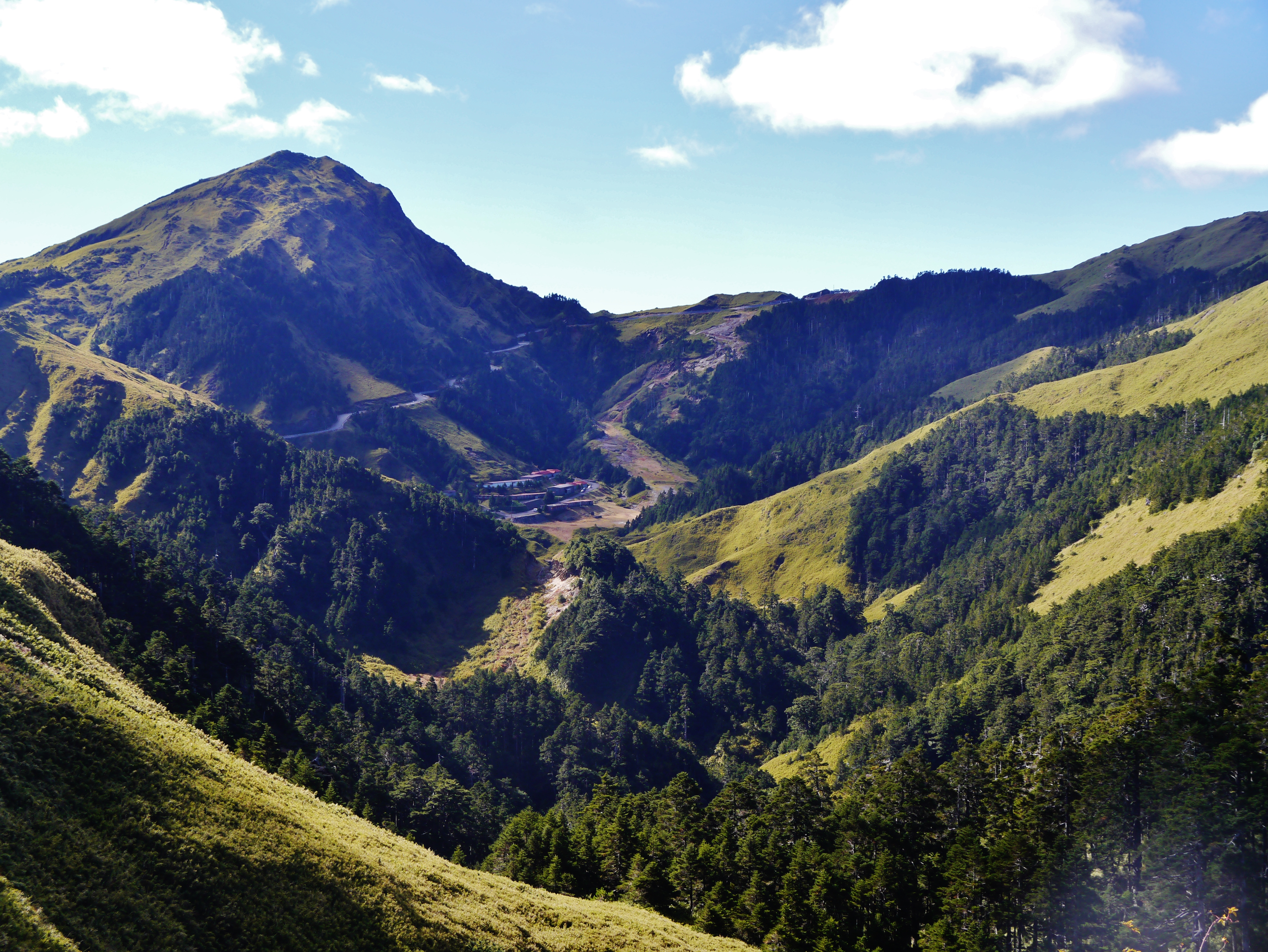
View of Wuling from Mt. Shimen to the north

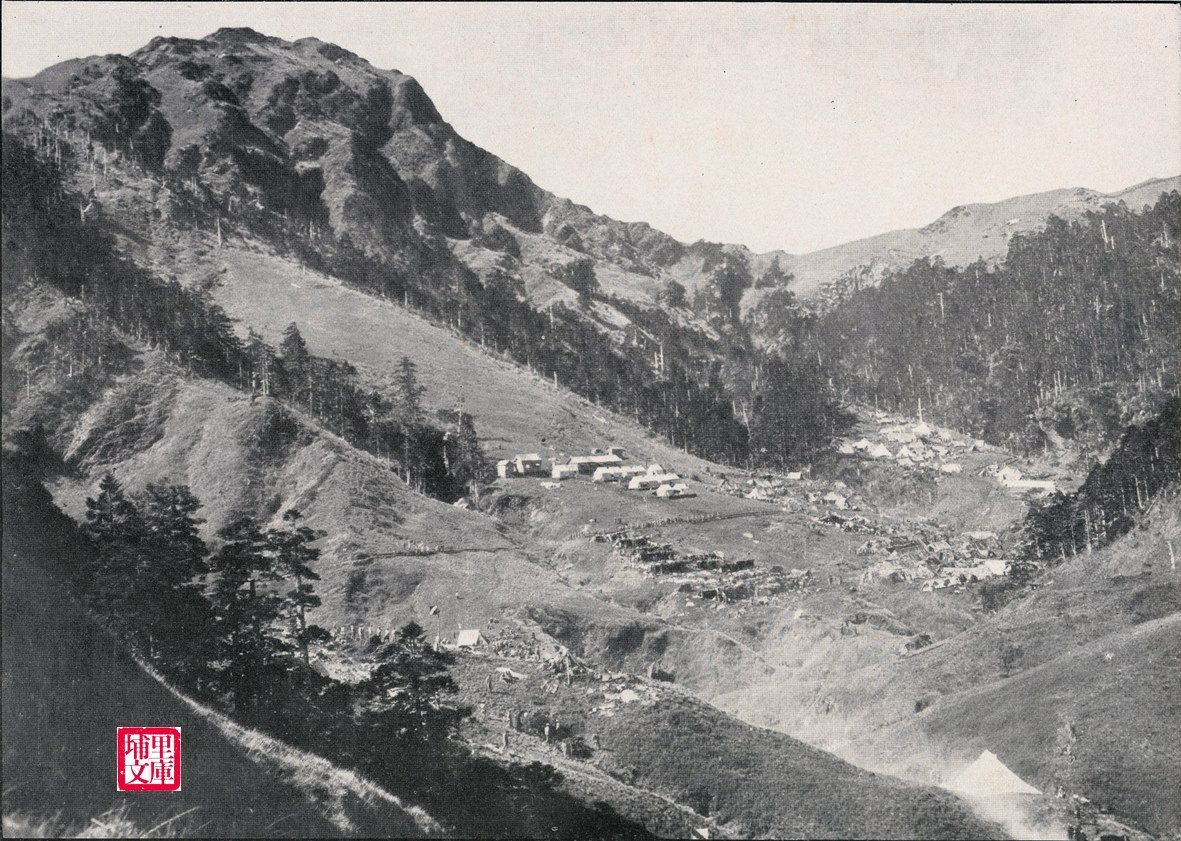
A Japanese camp near Wuling during the Truku War

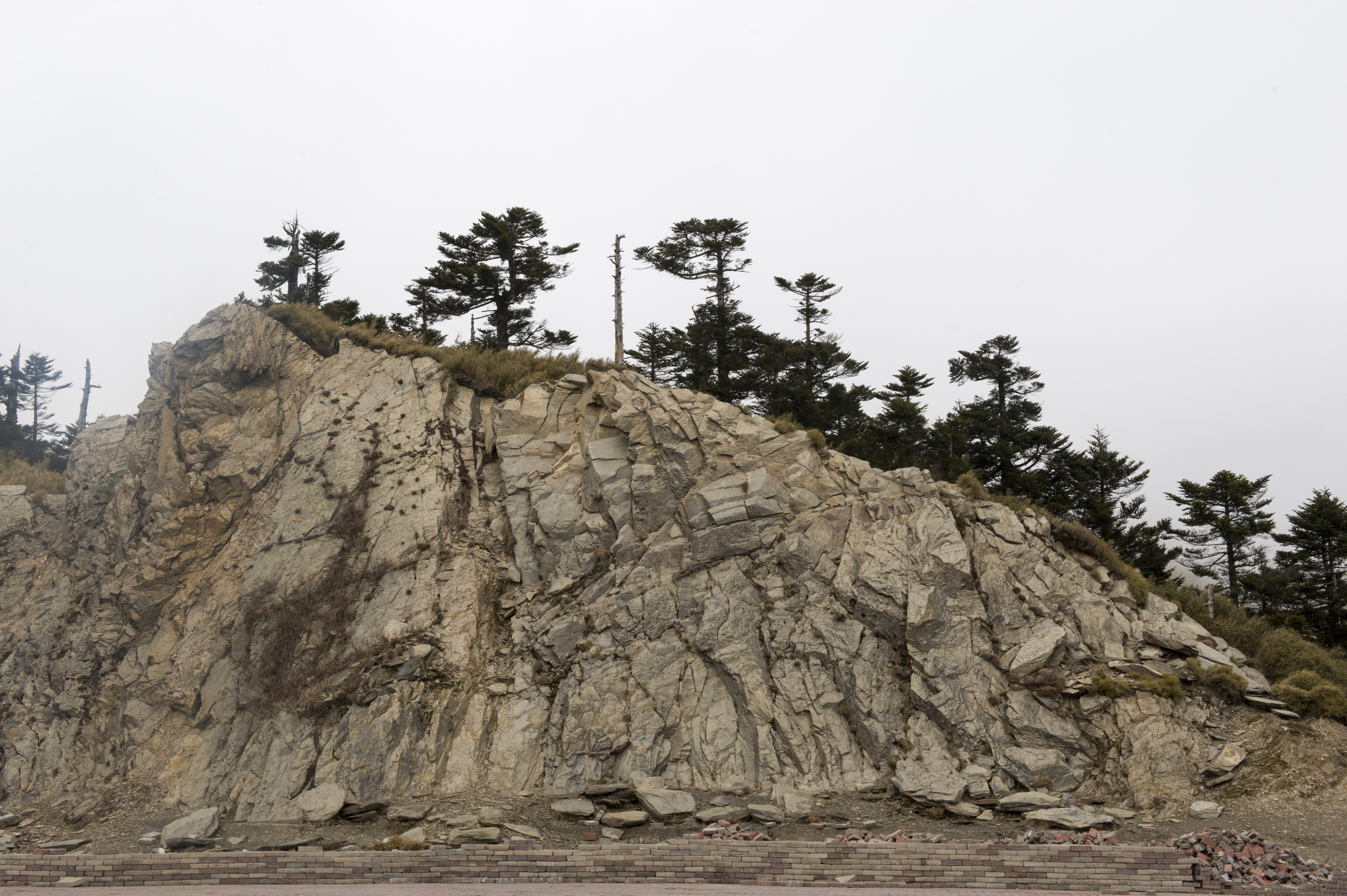
Rock formation at Wuling
