= June 2017 Taiwan rainstorm =

Weather event in Taiwan

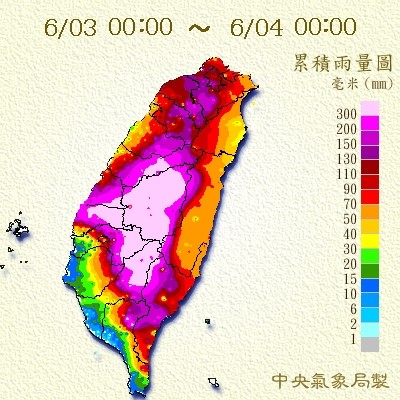
Total rainfall map of a typical Meiyu front in Taiwan (June 3–4)

The June 2017 Taiwan rainstorm was a severe weather event that affected Taiwan during the first week of June 2017, bringing prolonged heavy rainfall across much of the island. The storm resulted in three deaths, two missing persons, and 35 injuries, while 3,971 residents were evacuated from affected areas. The disaster caused an estimated NT$271.15 million in damage to agricultural production and public infrastructure, with Nantou County suffering the most severe losses. In response, the Taiwanese authorities placed approximately 30,000 military personnel on standby for disaster relief and emergency operations. Later that month, Taiwan was affected by another episode of heavy rainfall associated with the seasonal Meiyu (plum rain) front, resulting in a second rainstormevent in June.

== Causes and effects ==
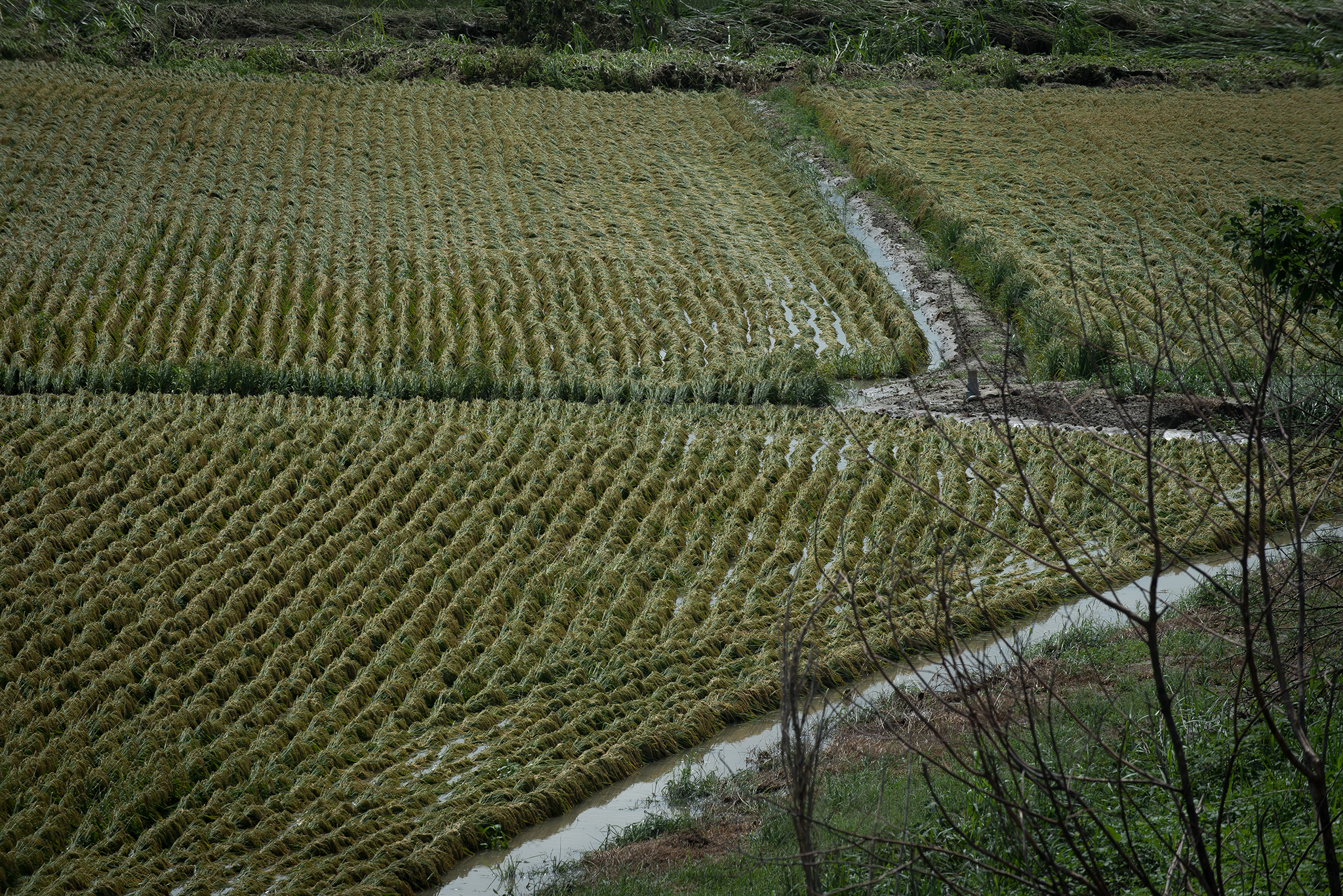
Agricultural losses in Chiayi County.

In late May 2017, a Meiyu front, combined with a southwest airflow, affected Taiwan. A strong convective system that had developed along the island's northern coast gradually expanded southward, leading to the rainstorm event.The Central Weather Bureau of Taiwan stated that the event was associated with a “typical Meiyu front”. The agency warned that localized severe weather could occur ahead of the front, including thunderstorms, strong wind gusts, and hail.The China Meteorological Administration also issued a yellow rainstorm warning and a blue convective weather warning signal for areas affected by the system.

On 1 June, rainfall associated with the southwesterly airflow developed over the mountainous regions of central and southern Taiwan. During the early hours of 2 June, the Meiyu front reached northern Taiwan. Between 02:00 and 12:00, the heaviest rainfall was concentrated in the Taipei, New Taipei, and Keelung areas. Later that night, heavy rain shifted to the mountainous regions of central and southern Taiwan, where intense precipitation continued from 22:00 on 2 June until 07:00 on 3 June. Numerous weather stations recorded rainfall totals that met the criteria for extremely heavy rain. On 3 June, the front stalled over central Taiwan before gradually moving northward after nightfall, bringing persistent rainfall to the mountainous regions of northern and central Taiwan. By 4 June, the southwesterly airflow had weakened and rainfall intensity decreased significantly. During the event, several locations in northern, central, and southern Taiwan recorded record short-duration rainfall intensities. The maximum three-hour accumulated rainfall exceeded 210 mm in both Sanzhi District, New Taipei City, and Caoling, Yunlin County, while cumulative rainfall in the Nantianchi area of Kaohsiung reached 1,446 mm.

== Disaster situation ==
On 1 June, the Central Weather Bureau released a rainfall forecast map indicating that showers or thunderstorms were expected in various parts of Taiwan from 2 to 3 June, with a possibility of rainfall reaching Level 1 or higher. The bureau also forecast that, under the influence of a stationary front, showers or thunderstorms would continue across the island on 4 and 5 June, with a risk of localized heavy rain or torrential rainfall. As the front approached Taiwan, the Water Resources Agency of the Ministry of Economic Affairs activated a Level 2 Emergency Response Team under the Central Emergency Operation Center at 1:00 p.m. on 2 June. The agency reported that 13 townships and districts in New Taipei and Keelung had reached the Level 1 flood warning threshold. In addition, local emergency operation centers were established in 11 counties and cities.

Heavy rainfall caused a transmission tower at Nuclear Power Plant No. 1 in New Taipei to collapse, resulting in a power supply failure and the malfunction of Unit 2. The following day, the Central Weather Bureau reported that the front was moving southward and advised residents in central and southern Taiwan to remain alert for heavy rainfall. On 4 June, flash floods occurred in parts of central and southern Taiwan. In Xinyi Township, Nantou County, the foundations of five houses were washed away, causing the buildings to topple into a river. In Kaohsiung, rising river levels destroyed 12 houses in flood-affected areas.

By 6 June, the Directorate General of Highways of the Ministry of Transportation and Communications and the Soil and Water Conservation Bureau of the Council of Agriculture had recorded a total of 71 landslide sites. These were located along Provincial Highways 2, 7, 8, 14, and 21. The landslides caused traffic disruptions on the affected highways. A total of 498 streams with potential debris-flow hazards were placed under red alert, while 315 were placed under yellow alert. The affected agricultural area totaled 6,130 hectares. The Public Construction Commission of the Executive Yuan stated that if municipal and county governments exhausted their disaster preparedness funds for the year, they could apply to the Executive Yuan for assistance with the reconstruction of public facilities in accordance with the Measures for Handling Disaster Relief Funds for Local Governments at All Levels for Major Natural Disasters. The commission also stated that an on-site inspection and review mechanism would be initiated as part of the assistance process.

== Subsequent events ==
In response to the severe damage caused by the rainstorm, the governments of New Taipei, Taichung, Changhua County, Nantou County, Yunlin County, Chiayi County, and Kaohsiung provided cash relief and low-interest loans to affected residents.

=== Delayed announcements of work and school suspensions ===
Following heavy rainfall in New Taipei during the morning of 2 June, the city government announced the suspension of work and classes in Shimen District at approximately 8:00 a.m. Similar measures were subsequently announced for Jinshan and Sanzhi districts around two hours later, followed about an hour afterward by Danshui, Wanli, and Bali districts. The timing of the announcements drew criticism from residents, many of whom commented on the New Taipei City Government's official Facebook page, My New Taipei City, that the notices had been issued too late. In response, New Taipei Mayor Eric Chu stated that, during future heavy rainfall events, district chiefs and school principals would be authorized to make timely decisions and assume responsibility for suspending work and classes when necessary.

In Nantou County, County Magistrate Lin Ming-chen announced the suspension of work and classes at 7:00 a.m. on 3 June, a decision that also generated public criticism. Lin later stated that he would instruct the personnel department and other relevant agencies to closely monitor weather conditions, improve the timing of future suspension announcements, and address public concerns.

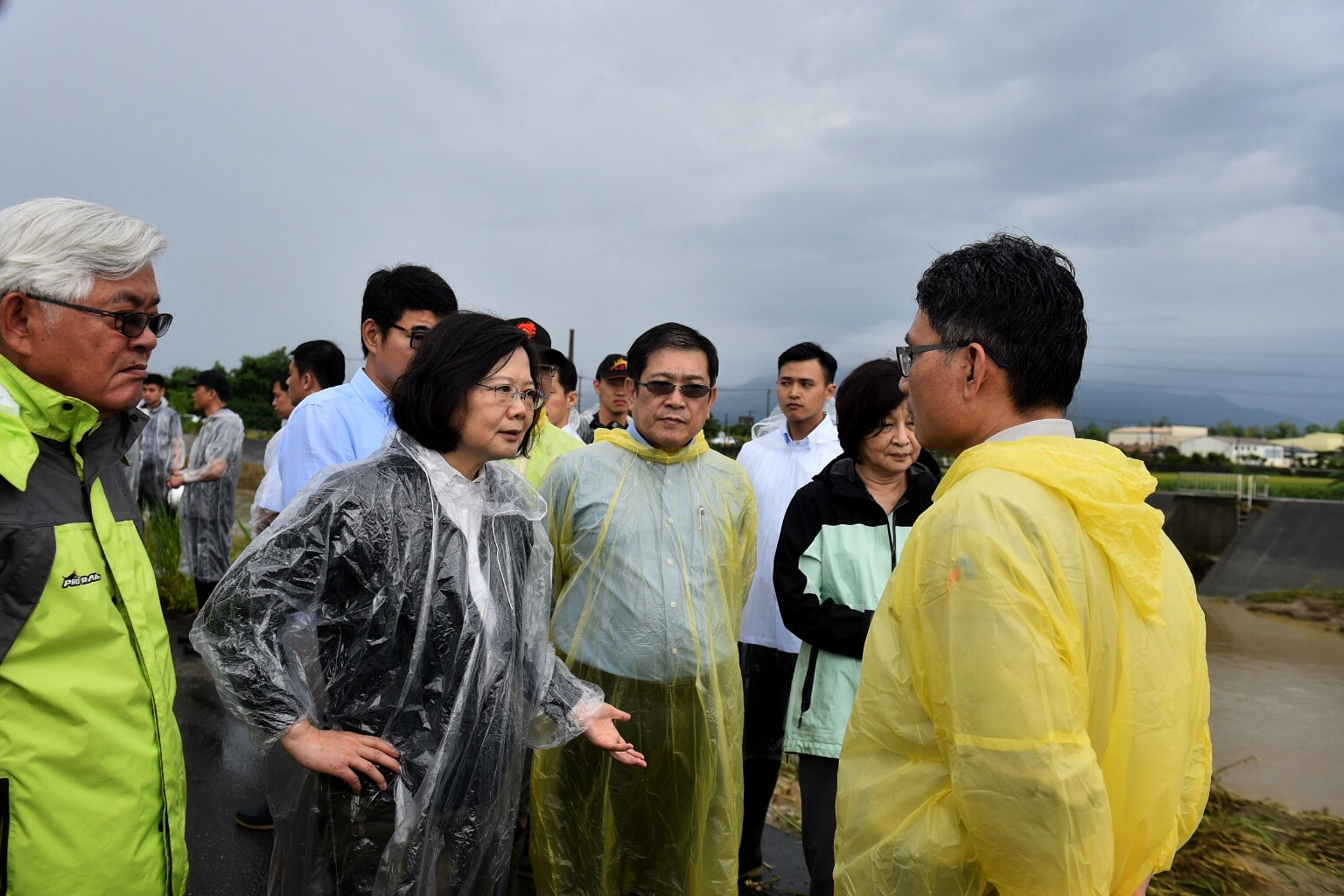
On June 4, President Tsai Ing-wen inspected flood control measures at Shiniu Creek and Dahukou in Yunlin County.

=== Executive Yuan's Forward-Looking Infrastructure Development Program ===
In April 2017, the Executive Yuan approved the Forward-Looking Infrastructure Development Program, a national infrastructure initiative intended to promote investment and support economic development through the construction and improvement of public infrastructure. During the rainstorm, Premier Lin Chuan inspected disaster-affected areas in New Taipei and Keelung. He faced criticism from some residents, who argued that inadequate levee management had contributed to flooding in local communities. Lin stated that water environment issues within the Forward-Looking Infrastructure Development Program should be re-evaluated.Democratic Progressive Party legislator Huang Wei-che argued that only NT$72 billion of the program's budget had been allocated to river improvement and regional drainage projects in counties and cities, and called for additional funding for such projects. Chan Chien-teng, director of the Soil and Water Conservation Ecological Engineering Research Center at National Cheng Kung University, stated that the severe damage caused by the seasonal rains in numerous counties and cities fell outside the scope of the program's original planning. He suggested that adjustments to the program were necessary to reduce the risk of similar disasters in the future.

Wu Hongmou stated that only 53 percent of county- and city-administered river and regional drainage improvement projects had been completed, leaving 47 percent unfinished. He argued that these figures demonstrated the need for continued investment in water environment infrastructure projects. When President Tsai Ing-wen visited Yunlin County on 2 June to inspect the disaster situation, she stated that previous water management plans had limitations and shortcomings. Tsai said that the central government should provide greater support to counties and cities with limited financial resources and would instruct relevant agencies to make flexible use of the competitive funding allocated under the Forward-Looking Infrastructure Development Program. During an inspection visit to Keelung on 4 June, Tsai stated that responsibility for managing the Dawulun River rested with the local government but added that the central government would assist jurisdictions facing financial constraints. She also noted that the program allowed flexibility in the allocation of funds and pledged support for the construction of flood detention facilities.

=== Equipment failures and engineering problems ===
Following the rainstorm, an employee of the New Taipei City Water Resources Bureau told local media that the New Taipei City Government’s flood warning system had been inoperative since November 2016. According to the employee, the system was unable to issue rainfall alerts, rendering rainfall warning functions at pumping stations ineffective. In response, the New Taipei City Water Resources Bureau stated that it would provide a more comprehensive explanation regarding the operation of the flood warning system.

During the rainstorm, Chen Kunxin, chief of Jianguo Village in Keelung, observed that a drainage channel on Lide Road was not functioning properly. Following an inspection, he reported that one side of the channel had been blocked. The Keelung District Prosecutors Office subsequently announced that, in order to safeguard public safety and property, it would conduct a separate investigation into the matter. The case was to be investigated on suspicion of offenses related to public endangerment. A major road collapse also occurred near the main shrine area of Zhongzheng Park in Keelung, leaving the roadway severely damaged and distorted. After inspecting the site, Keelung City Councilor Chen Dongcai stated that the collapsed retaining wall contained no reinforcing steel bars and that the asphalt pavement did not meet the required thickness. The Engineering Office of the Keelung City Government stated that, in order to restore access for local residents as quickly as possible, construction had begun on a temporary 4-metre-wide roadway along the outer side of the roadside drainage channel adjacent to the collapsed slope. The temporary road was to be built using H-shaped steel beams and liner plates and was expected to be completed within ten days.

=== Waste disposal problem ===
The rainstorm washed large quantities of polystyrene used in aquaculture and discarded oyster racks onto shore, resulting in the accumulation of marine debris along the coastlines of Annan, Anping, and South districts in Tainan. The Tainan Environmental Protection Bureau conducted a three-day cleanup operation, removing more than 2,400 kilograms of waste, including approximately 600 kilograms of polystyrene.

Large amounts of driftwood and debris were also reported in the coastal waters of Keelung's North Coast and Northeast Coast regions, with the greatest accumulation occurring at Badouzi Fishing Port. By noon on 7 June, approximately 3 tonnes of waste had been removed.

Following the rainstorm, several rivers in Taiwan overflowed their banks. Chen Chung-hsien, director of the Fifth River Management Office, inspected the flooded area of Sanguang Village and agreed to complete dredging work on privately owned sections of the Shiniu Creek channel in Douliu, Yunlin County, within one week. He also pledged to carry out emergency repairs to a breached earthen embankment.

Similarly, dredging operations were undertaken in the Dawulun River in Keelung, which had also overflowed during the rainstorm. The work was carried out with assistance from the Keelung Environmental Protection Bureau and the Republic of China Armed Forces, while the Keelung City Engineering Office began removing accumulated sediment on 8 June.

Afterward, Keelung City Councilor Lu Mei-ling criticized the city government's handling of the river. She stated that she had repeatedly urged the government to dredge the Dawulun River following previous flooding incidents during the three-year tenure of Mayor Lin Yu-chang, but that no action had been taken. Lu also called on Lin to issue an apology to local residents.

== Explanation ==
1. “Typical Meiyu front” refers to the Meiyu front lingering near Taiwan, and the front is accompanied by strong southwest winds or southwest airflow. This weather pattern is prone to continuous storms.

== See ==
- Heavy rains in Taiwan in mid-June 2017
