= Dayuling =

Mountain pass in Xiulin, Hualien, Taiwan

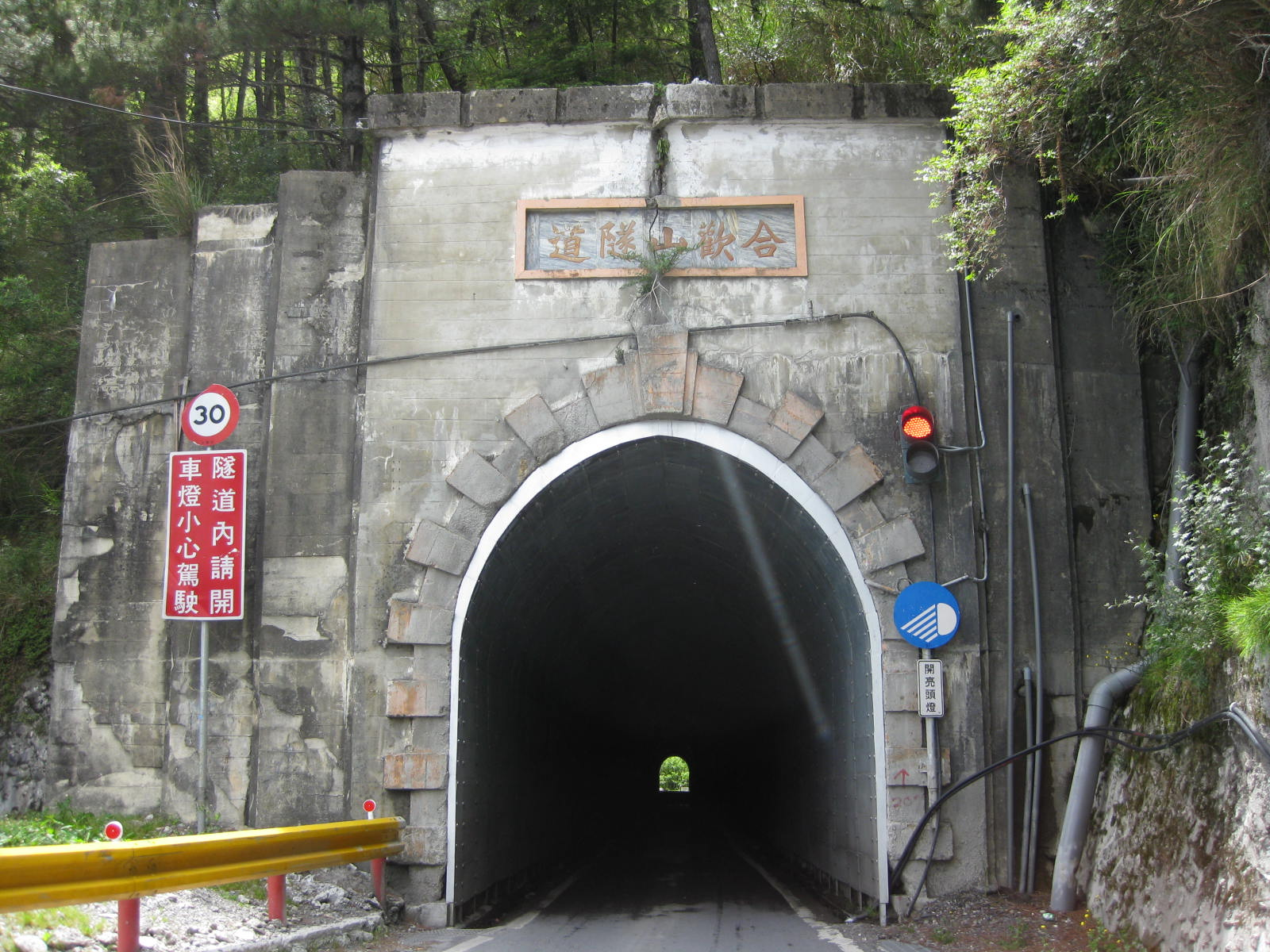
- Hehuanshan Tunnel

- Location within Taiwan
- Elevation: 2,565 metres (8,415 ft)
- Traversed by: Provincial Highway 8 Provincial Highway 14A

Third Approach
- Location: Xiulin, Hualien, Taiwan
- Range: Central Mountain Range
- Coordinates: 24°10′51″N 121°18′36″E

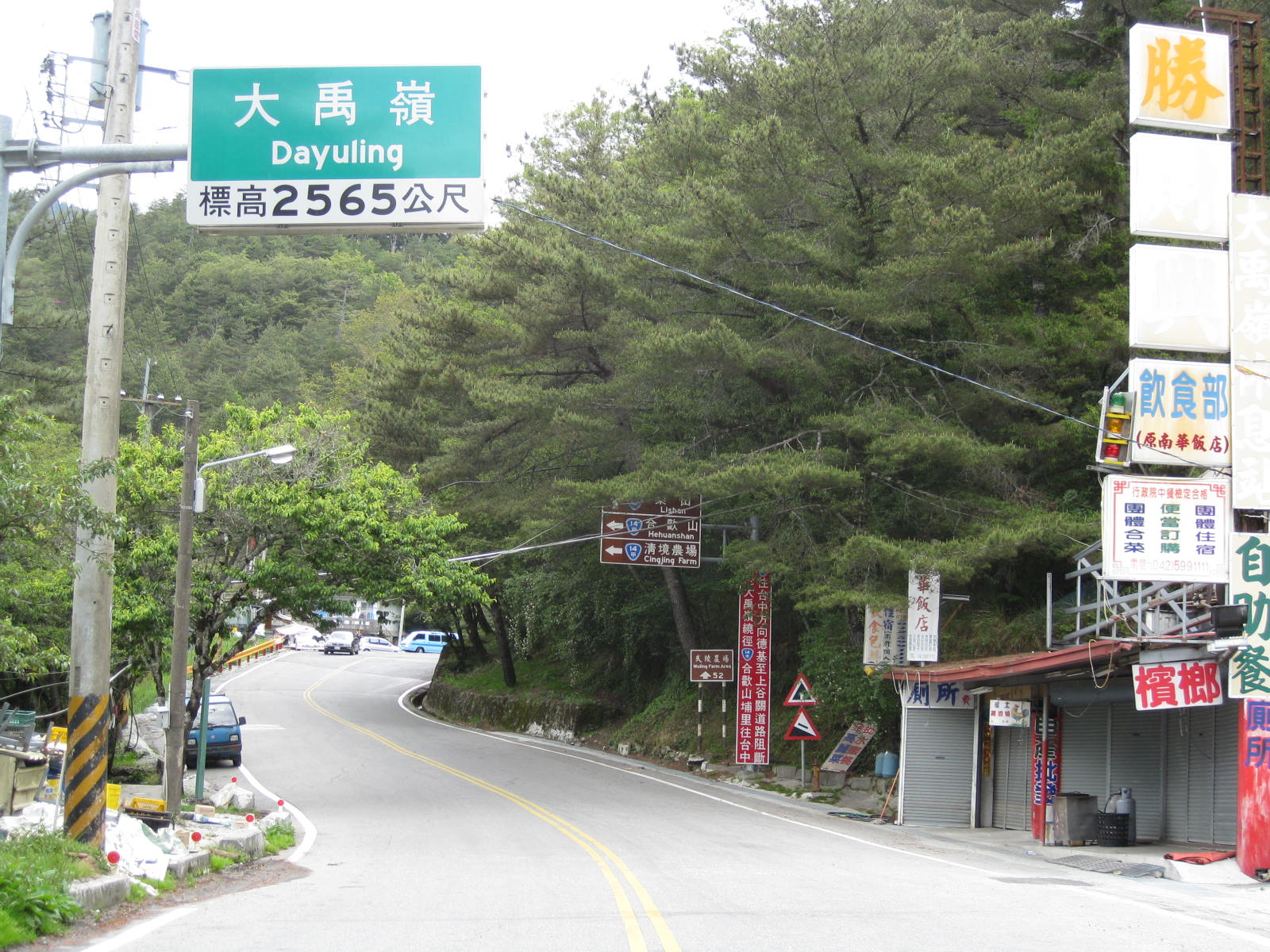
Stores at Dayuling

Dayuling (Chinese: 大禹嶺; pinyin: Dàyǔlǐng, el. 2565 m), formerly Hehuan Pass (Chinese: 合歡埡口; pinyin: Héhuān Yàkǒu), is a mountain pass in Taiwan transversing the Central Mountain Range between Hehuanshan and Mt. Bilu (畢祿山), within Taroko National Park. Administratively, it is located in Xiulin, Hualien County, near the border with Nantou County.

== Description ==
Dayuling is located at the intersection of Central Cross-Island Highway and Provincial Highway 14A. As the highest point of the Central Cross-Island Highway, Dayuling is typically considered as the dividing point of the highway into its west and east sections. To the west, the highway passes through a short one-way tunnel known as the Hehuanshan Tunnel (合歡山隧道) before descending to Lishan. To the east, the highway passes through Tianxiang before dropping into Taroko Gorge. Meanwhile, Highway 14A branches away to the south, climbing to its peak at Wuling.

Dayuling's surrounding area is known for its high-altitude agriculture, producing high-mountain tea, apples, and peaches.

== History ==
Originally, a trail was built by the Atayal people passed near Dayuling. During the Japanese occupation of Taiwan, the Governor-General of Taiwan, Sakuma Samata, ordered the construction of a road through the same trail as part of the five years plan to governing aborigines to better transport supplies in the Truku War.

After the change of power to the Kuomintang, the Nationalist government began building the Central Cross-Island Highway between 1956 and 1960. Chiang Kai-shek visited the pass in 1958, renaming the site as "Dayuling" after the story of Great Flood of Gun-Yu (Gun-Yu is alternatively known as Dayu) as a reference to the difficult construction.

== Geology ==
Dayuling is located within a stratum known as the Dayuling Formation (大禹嶺層), a subset of the Bilu Formation (畢祿山層). The stratum was first identified by geologist Zhaoxia Chen (陳肇夏) in 1979. The 2,200 meter thick layer is composed of slate, phyllite, and quartzite. Nummulite fossils were found near Dayuling, the first in Taiwan. Due to the foliation of the rock, the construction of Hehuanshan Tunnel at Dayuling proved to be difficult and prone to collapse.
