= Hehuanshan =

Mountain in central Taiwan

Mount Hehuan 合歡山
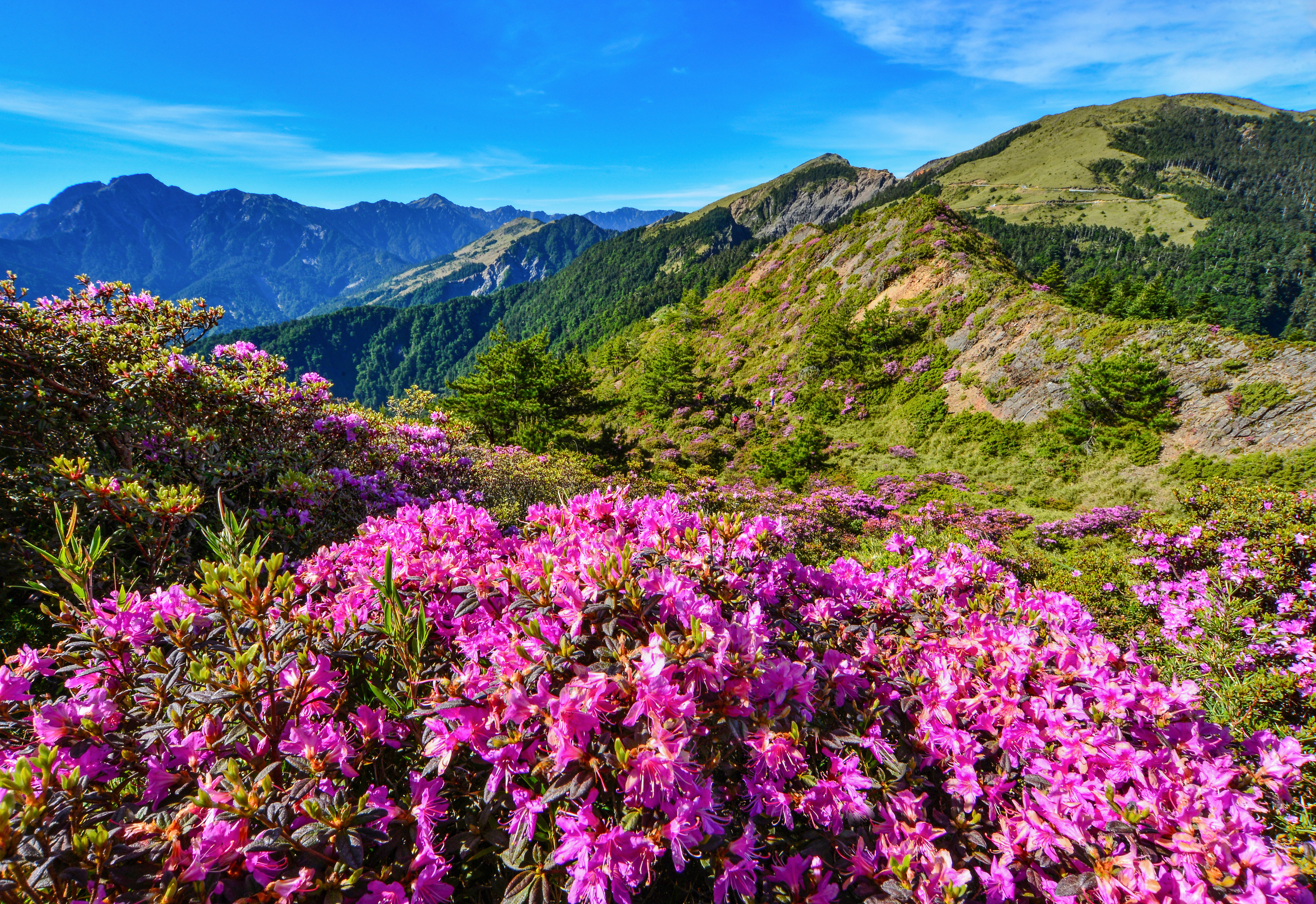

Highest point
- Elevation: 3,422 m (11,227 ft)
- Listing: 100 Peaks of Taiwan
- Coordinates: 24°10′53″N 121°16′53″E

Geography
- Location: Nantou and Hualien counties, Taiwan
- Parent range: Central Mountains

Hehuanshan (Chinese: 合歡山; pinyin: Héhuān Shān; Pe̍h-ōe-jī: Ha̍p-hoan-soaⁿ; also called Joy Mountain or Mount Hehuan) is a 3,416-metre-high (11,207 ft) mountain in Central Taiwan. The peak lies on the border of Nantou and Hualien counties and is located within the far west of Taroko National Park. Hehuanshan is a popular destination in central Taiwan as the trail to the summit is wide, paved, and gradual, and only takes around 1.5 hours round-trip yet offers 360 degree views above the surroundings. The 3,421-metre east peak and 3,422-metre north peak of Hehuanshan are both higher than the main peak. Hehuanshan was established as Taiwan's first national forest recreation area and is one of the most accessible mountains in Taiwan for tourists.

Hehuanshan is part of the Central Mountain Range.

== Recreation ==
Snow, rare in the rest of Taiwan, is relatively common on Hehuanshan during the winter months. Highway 14 leads to Wuling, a saddle between the main peak and the east peak of Hehuanshan. At 3,275 metres (10,745 ft), Wuling is the highest point in Taiwan that is accessible by road. From Highway 14, a trail leads to the summit of the main peak. At the summit, there is a weather station.

In addition to hiking, Hehuanshan is a popular location for stargazing and was declared an International Dark Sky Park in 2019.

Popular trails in the Hehuan mountain range include the East Peak, North Peak, West Peak and Mount Shimen.

== History ==
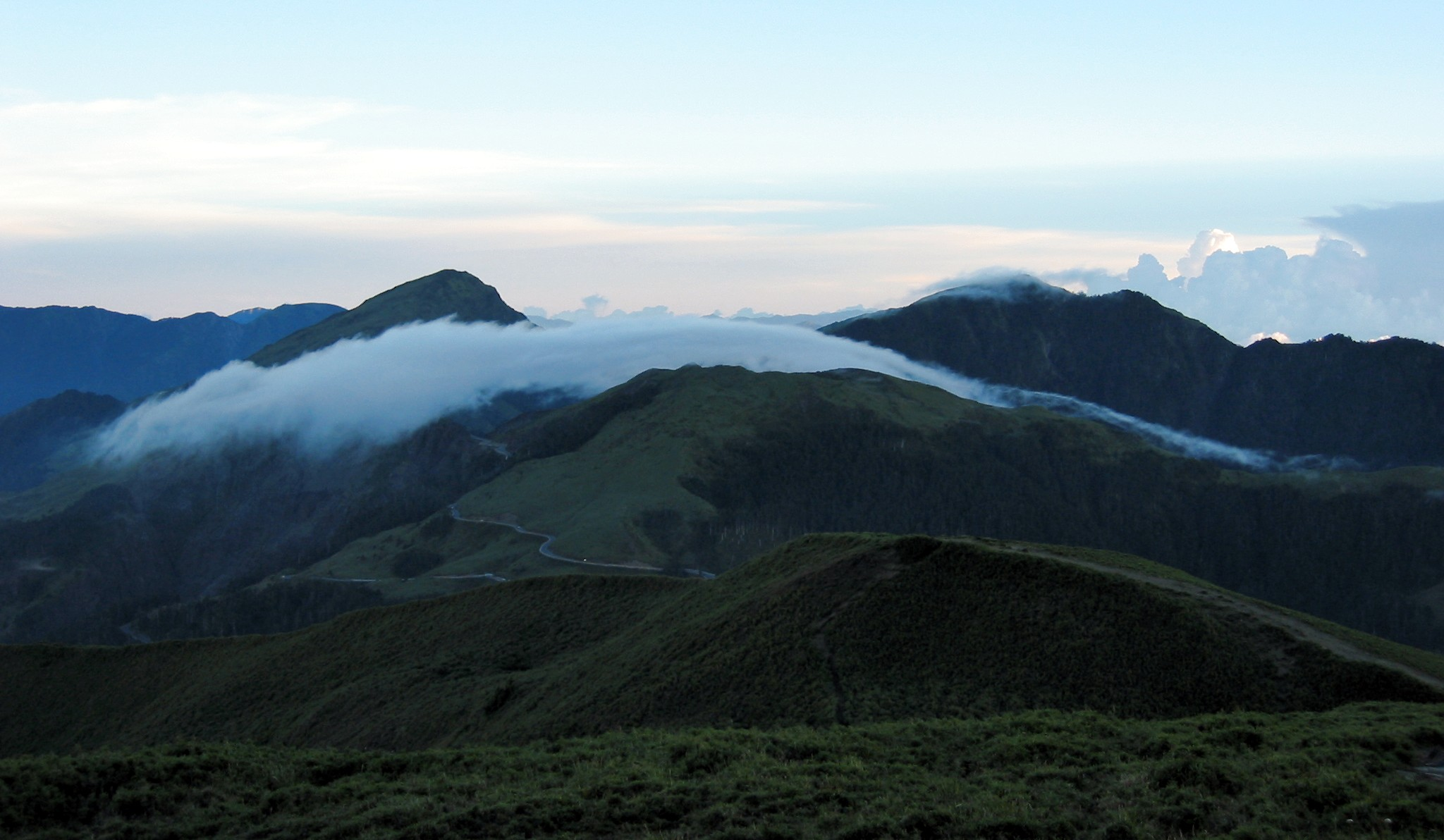
Hehuanshan East and Main Peak at sunset from North Peak

In March 1913, Japanese surveyor Yasushi Noro attempted to scale Hehuanshan to conduct a survey of the area. However, he turned back after 89 Taiwanese members of his team died in a storm. This was the deadliest mountaineering disaster in Taiwanese history. Noro ascended Hehuanshan in October 1913 and completed the survey, which helped Japanese forces in the Truku War.

In the past, a military training area was built within proximity of Hehuanshan. The mountain range also features the remains of a ski lift, reportedly used by Taiwan's elite during the martial law period and inaccessible to most people. The unreliability of snowfall has meant that the ski lift was abandoned years ago. Remains of the ski lift mechanism are still visible to hikers on the east peak trail.

== Highway 14 ==
Highway 14 connects Puli, through Wushe (Ren-ai), and Qingjing Farm to Wuling. The narrow and winding road is considered a dangerous and difficult road. The road is often clogged in winter, when many locals travel up the mountain to see snow.

Highway 14 is currently the only available road crossing the Central Mountain Range via the famous Taroko Gorge. The Central Cross-Island Highway, which crossed the mountains north of Hehuanshan, was damaged during the September 21, 1999 earthquake and closed indefinitely.

== See also ==
- List of mountains in Taiwan
