= Provincial Highway 18 (Taiwan) =

Provincial highway in Taiwan

Provincial Highway 18
- 台18線
- Alishan Highway

Route information
- Maintained by Directorate General of Highways
- Length: 108.559 km (67.455 mi)

Major junctions
- West end: Taibao, Chiayi
- Nat 3 in Zhongpu, Chiayi
- East end: Prov 21 in Xinyi, Nantou

Location
- Country: Taiwan

Highway system
- Highway system in Taiwan
← Prov 17	→ Prov 19

Taiwan Provincial Highway No. 18 is a highway between Taibao in Chiayi County to Provincial Highway No. 21 at Tatajia (Tataka) in Yushan National Park. It is also called the New Central Cross-Island Highway (新中橫公路) and Alishan Highway(阿里山公路). The highway connects Chiayi City and the rest of Western Taiwan to Alishan National Scenic Area and Yushan National Park. The overall length of the highway is 108.559 km.

== Route description ==
The highway begins in front of Chiayi HSR station in Taibao City as HSR Avenue, which connects the station with downtown Chiayi City. The highway continues eastbound as it leaves Chiayi City for Alishan. In Zhongpu the highway has a junction with Freeway 3. The road then passes through Fanlu and Zhuqi before reaching Alishan Township, home to the popular tourist destination of Alishan National Scenic Area and Alishan Forest Railway. The highway then continues eastbound through the Alishan mountains and enters Yushan National Park, before ending at the junction of PH 21 in Tatajia, located near the foot of Yushan, the highest mountain in Taiwan.

The highway was initially planned to extend to Yuli, Hualien as a part of the New Central Cross-Island Highway. Due to environmental concerns, however, most of the segment extending from Tatajia to Hualien was never built. In 2006, the plan was formally abandoned. The only segment that was completed, between Zhuoxi, Hualien and Yuli, was merged into PH 30 as of 2007.

== See also ==
- Highway system in Taiwan
- Provincial Highway 7, the Northern Cross-Island Highway
- Provincial Highway 8, the Central Cross-Island Highway
  - Provincial Highway 14
- New Central Cross-Island Highway
  - Provincial Highway 21
- Provincial Highway 20, the Southern Cross-Island Highway
