= Southern Cross-Island Highway =

Road in Taiwan

Provincial Highway 20
- 台20線
- Southern Cross-Island Highway

Route information
- Maintained by Directorate General of Highways
- Length: 208.3 km (129.4 mi)

Major junctions
- West end: Central Tainan City
- Nat 8 in Xinhua
- East end: Prov 9 in Guanshan, Taitung

Location
- Country: Taiwan

Highway system
- Highway system in Taiwan
← Prov 19	→ Prov 21

The Southern Cross-Island Highway (Chinese: 南橫公路; pinyin: Nán Héng Gōnglù), also known as Provincial Highway No. 20, links Tainan City on the west coast to Taitung City on the east coast, on the southern section of the island of Taiwan. The road is 209 kilometres (130 mi) long.

From west to east, the road passes through the townships of Sinhua, Yujing, Jiasian, and then the aboriginal communities of Taoyuan, Meishan, and Lidao.

The highest point of the road, Yakou, is 2,722 m (8,930 ft) above sea level. The section from Meishan to Yakou Tunnel lies within Yushan National Park. Before crossing the Central Mountain Range, the road follows the Laonong River Valley for a considerable distance.

The road, considered one of South Taiwan's major tourist attractions, is sometimes damaged by landslides, especially during the wet summer months. The route was cut through the mountains in the early 1970s, but the highest sections were not properly surfaced until 1992.

This highway and its 50-metre (160 ft) surrounding used to have mountain entry control so visitors had to pay a low fee to get Class B mountain entry permits (入山許可證). The mountain entry control is no longer in effect so mountain entry permits are no longer required.

== Typhoon damage and reconstruction ==
The highway was badly damaged by Typhoon Morakot in 2009, with landslides washing away entire sections, and has been closed ever since. Since then there have been continuous reconstruction works. In 2012 heavy rainfall caused further damage. The reopening of the entire length was not expected until end of April 2022, and that deadline was met with long queues after reopening.

== Gallery ==
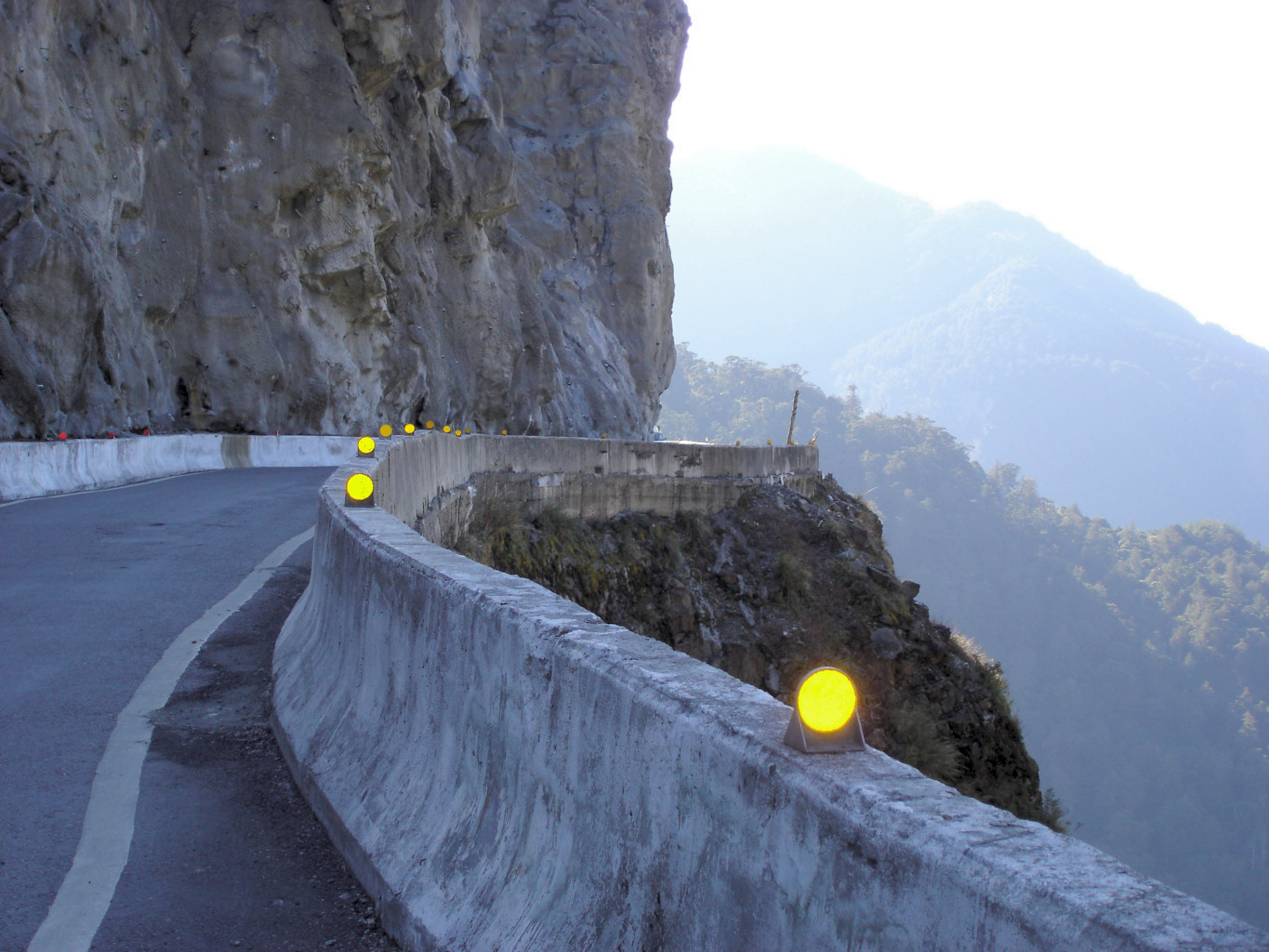
Southern Cross-Island Highway

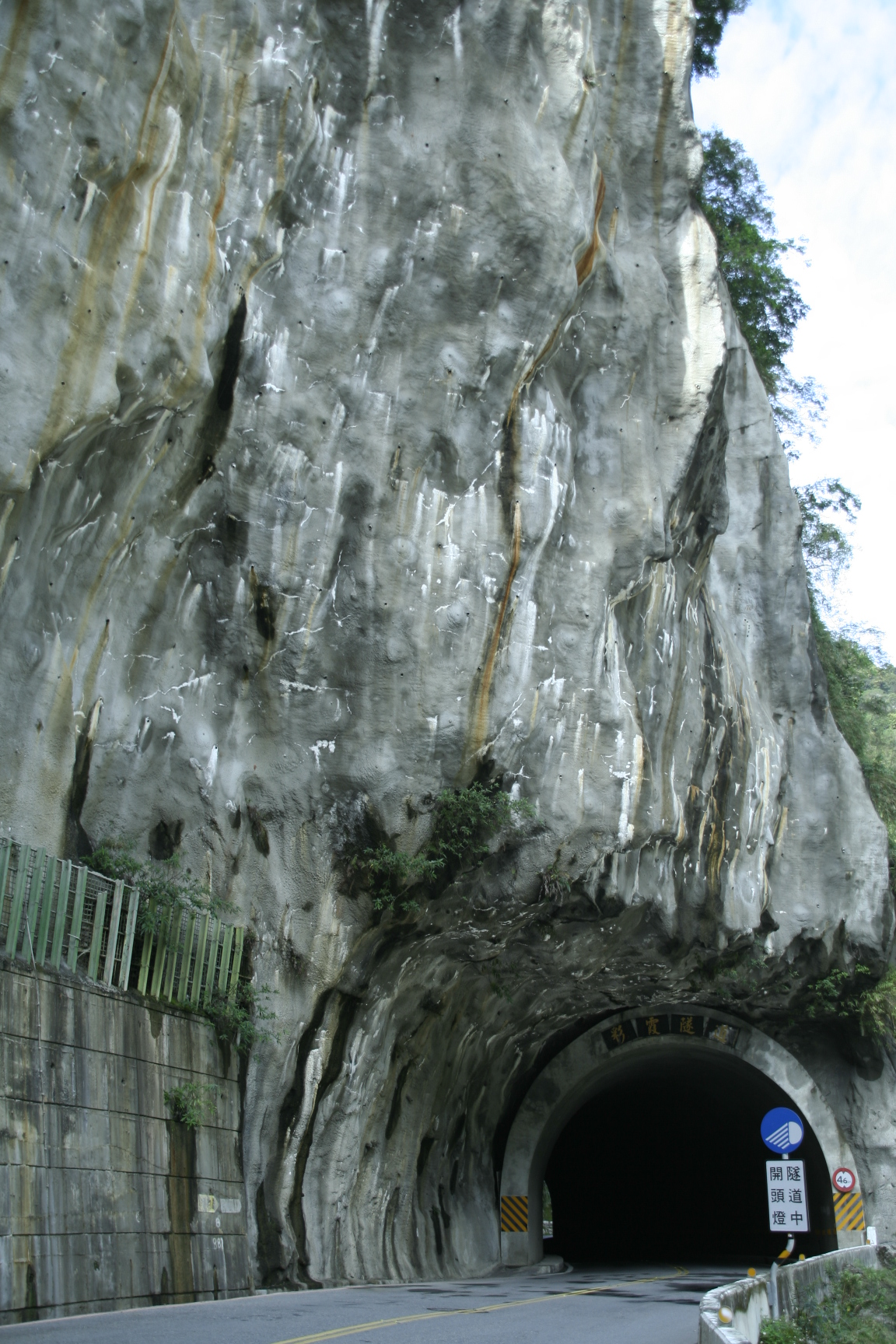
A Tunnel on the Southern Cross-Island Highway

== See also ==
- Highway system in Taiwan
- Provincial Highway 7, the Northern Cross-Island Highway
- Provincial Highway 8, the Central Cross-Island Highway
  - Provincial Highway 14
- New Central Cross-Island Highway
  - Provincial Highway 18
  - Provincial Highway 21

== Sources ==
- Derek Lee, 2004. A highway less traveled. Taipei Times
