= High-mountain tea =

Taiwanese oolong tea

Gaoshan tea
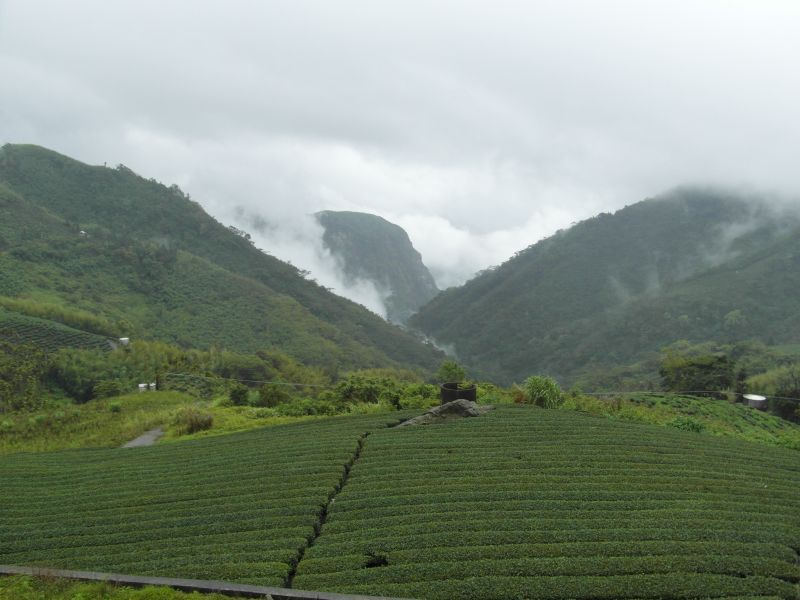
- Type: Oolong
- Other names: Kao-shan tea High mountain tea
- Origin: Taiwan
- Quick description: Light Oolong varieties with sweet, milky flavors and floral aromas

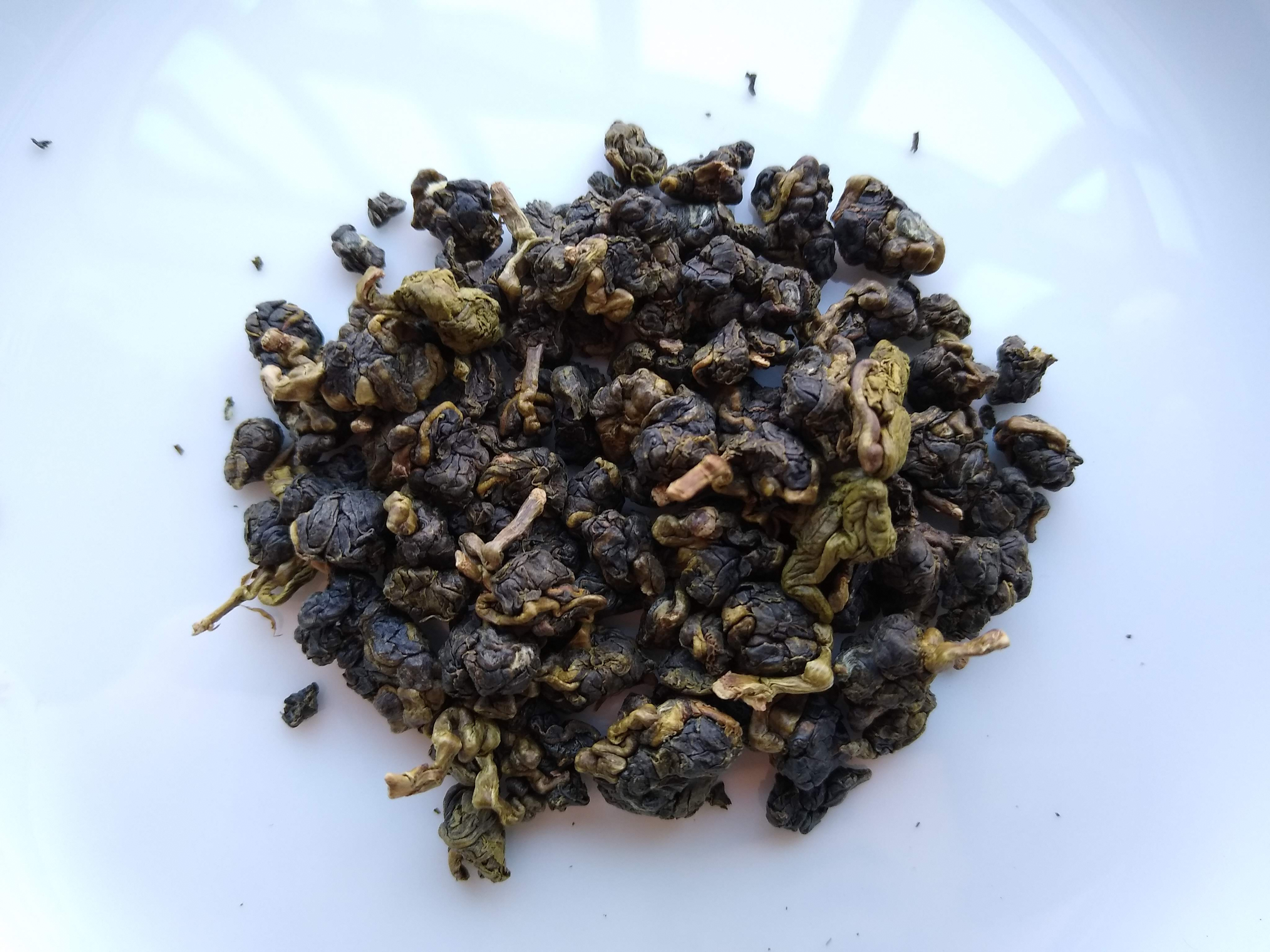
Gaoshan tea

High-mountain tea or gaoshan tea (Chinese: 高山茶; pinyin: gāoshān chá; pronounced [káʊ.ʂán ʈʂʰǎ]) refers to several varieties of Oolong tea grown in the mountains of central Taiwan. It is grown at altitudes higher than 1,000 metres (3,300 ft) above sea level, and includes varieties such as Alishan, Dayuling, Yu Shan, Wushe, and Lishan. The high humidity and natural precipitation in the high mountain ranges of Nantou and Chiayi Counties make the region a suitable environment for growing tea plants. High Mountain green teas can be characterized as tender, green, and sweet, with certain production processes also revealing notes of chestnut. Generally, high mountain teas are high sweet, high fresh, and low bitterness, making it more appealing to consumers. The fermentation process that removes the harsh ingredients allows the tea to taste flavorful.

== Production ==
Gaoshan tea leaves are usually hand harvested, and grow slowly due to the thin air in high altitudes. Hence, the yield of gaoshan tea is relatively low every year. There are two kinds of gaoshan tea based on the season: winter gaoshan is harvested during late October, and spring gaoshan is harvested during the middle of June.

It takes about 36 to 40 hours to process a batch of gaoshan tea. If weather allows, the handplucked leaves are spread on top of a tarp, where they develop aromas such as jasmine, rose and geranium. The tea is folded to bruise the leaf for oxidation and is then transferred to another tray to ferment and wither for eight hours. It is then packaged as "handkerchief tea", where farmers emphasize on the quality of the tea rather than the quantity.
