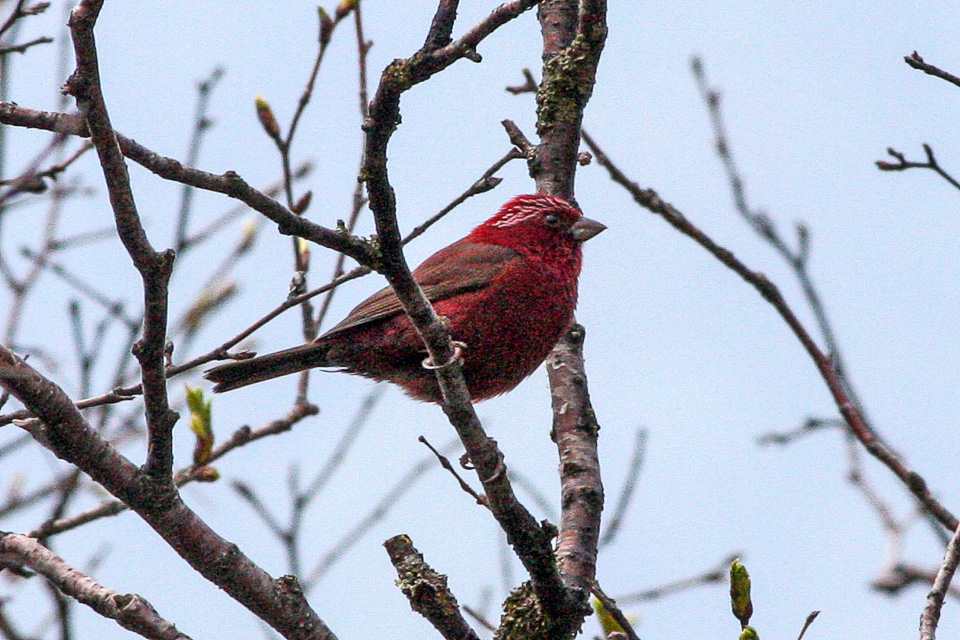

Conservation status
- Least Concern (IUCN 3.1)

Scientific classification
- Kingdom: Animalia
- Phylum: Chordata
- Class: Aves
- Order: Passeriformes
- Family: Fringillidae
- Subfamily: Carduelinae
- Genus: Carpodacus
- Species: C. vinaceus

Binomial name
- Carpodacus vinaceus Verreaux, 1871

= Vinaceous rosefinch =

Species of bird

The vinaceous rosefinch (Carpodacus vinaceus) is a species of finch in the family Fringillidae.

It is found in Nepal, China and far northern Myanmar. Its natural habitats are temperate forests and subtropical or tropical dry forests.

The Taiwan rosefinch is often considered a subspecies.

== Food ==
It feeds mainly upon small worms and seeds. It will sometimes pick through trash piles to find food, hence the nickname "Garbage Bird".

== Appearance ==
The Vinaceous Rosefinch is a medium-sized finch. The male is a dark crimson with brownish-black tail and wings, while the female is olive-brown with black spots.
