= National Freeway 6 =

Road in Taiwan

National freeway 6
- Shuishalian Freeway (水沙連高速公路)

Route information
- Maintained by Taiwan Area National Freeway Bureau
- Length: 37.6 km (23.4 mi)
- Existed: 21 March 2009–present

Major junctions
- West end: Nat 3 in Wufeng District
- East end: Prov 14 in Puli

Location
- Country: Taiwan

Highway system
- Highway system in Taiwan
← Nat 5	→ Nat 7

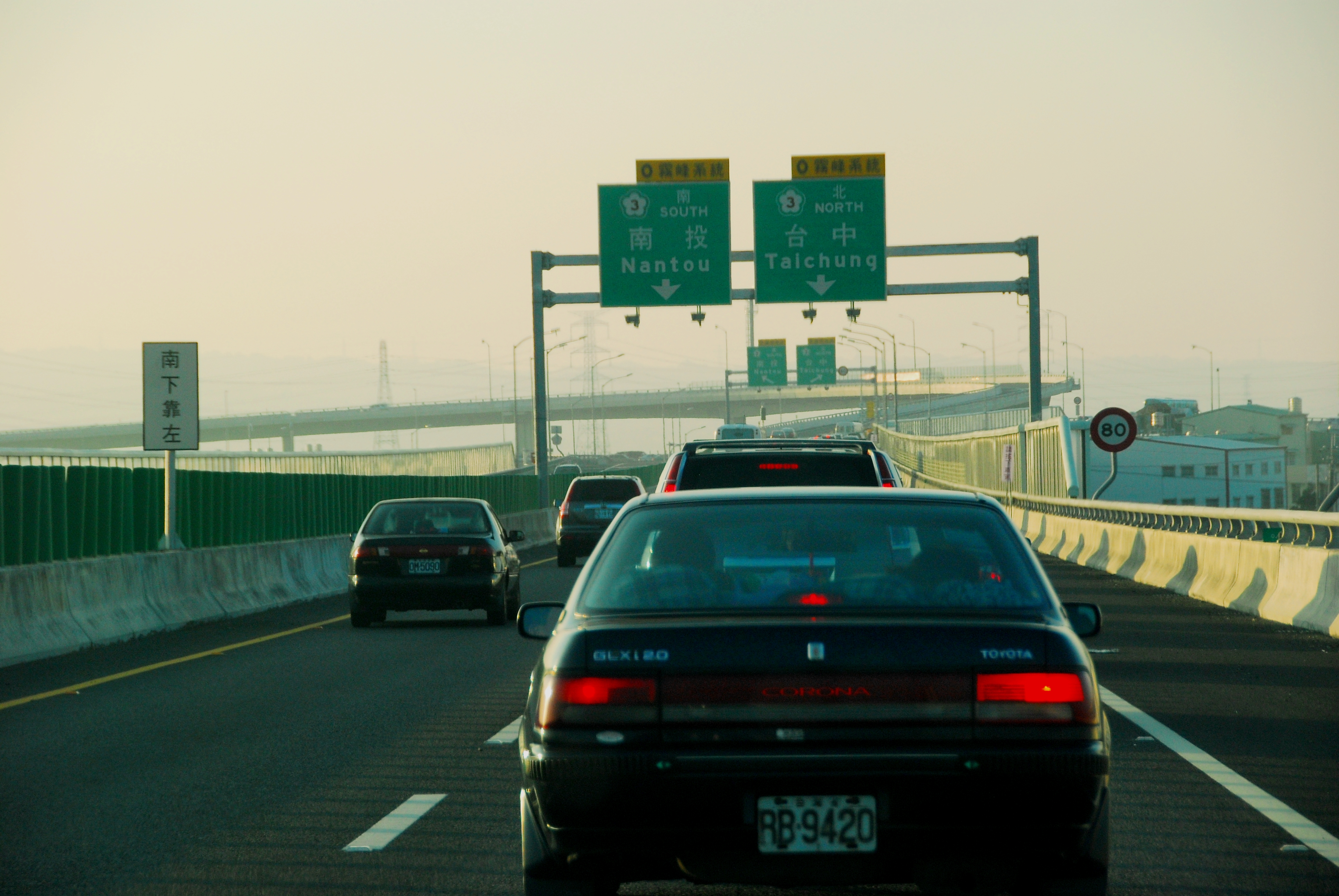
Freeway 6

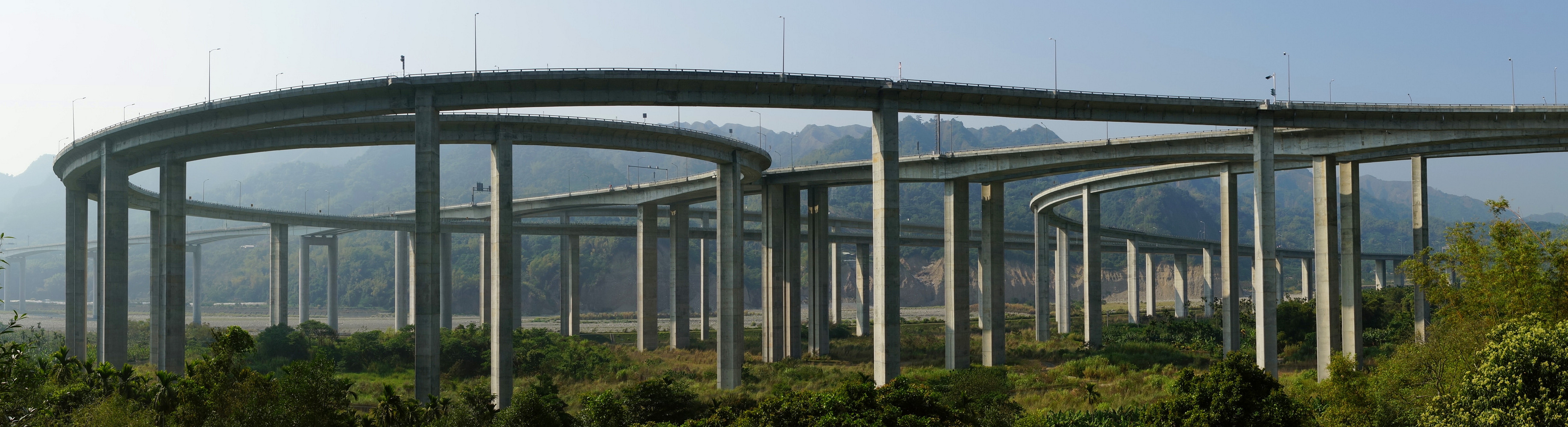
Guoxing Interchange

National freeway 6, also known as Shuishalian Freeway or Central East-West Freeway, is a freeway between Wufeng, Taichung and Puli, Nantou, and all of the main line was already open to traffic on 21 March 2009. The freeway runs parallel with provincial highway 14 for most of its length.

== Length ==
The length is about 37.6 km between Wufeng, Taichung and Puli, Nantou.

== Exit List ==
County	Location	km	mi	Exit	Name	Destinations	Notes
Taichung City	Wufeng	0.0	0.0	0	Wufeng System	Nat 3	
Taichung City	Wufeng	3.0	1.9	3	Jiuzheng	Prov 3 – Wufeng, Caotun	Westbound exit and eastbound entrance
Nantou	Caotun	5.0	3.1	5	East Caotun	Prov 14 – Caotun	
Nantou	Guoxing	17.0	10.6	17	Guoxing	Prov 14 – Guoxing	
Nantou	Guoxing	25.0	15.5	25	Beishan	Prov 14 – Guoxing, Puli	Eastbound exit and westbound entrance
Nantou	Puli	29.0	18.0	29	Ailan	Prov 14 – Yuchi, Puli	
Nantou	Puli	34.0	21.1	34	Puli	Prov 21 – Guoxing, Puli	Eastbound exit and westbound entrance
Nantou	Puli	37.0	23.0	37		Prov 14 – Puli, Wushe	
1.000 mi = 1.609 km; 1.000 km = 0.621 mi

== Background ==
Its construction began on 25 March 2004. On 27 January 2008, the main line between Ailan IC and Puli terminal was open to traffic. Then, the main line between Wufeng JCT and East Caotun IC, and the East Caotun connection way were open to traffic on 27 December 2008. The other part of main line between east Caotun IC and Ailan IC was already open to traffic on 21 March 2009. Afterwards, Guoxing IC was open to traffic on 22 October 2009. Then, Jiuzheng IC was open to traffic on 31 January 2011. Beishan IC was completed on 21 November 2013.

There is a plan to extend the route further east to Hualien City. However, it is economically impractical, because the cost of building this stretch of highway crossing over the Central Mountain Range is too high for it to only service people from Central Taiwan to Hualien.

== See also ==
- Highway system in Taiwan
