= Provincial Highway 21 (Taiwan) =

Provincial highway in Taiwan

Provincial Highway 21
- 台21線

Route information
- Maintained by Directorate General of Highways
- Length: 144.385 km (89.717 mi)

Major junctions
- North end: Prov 8 in Dongshi, Taichung City
- Nat 6 in Puli
- South end: Prov 18 in Xinyi, Nantou

Location
- Country: Taiwan

Highway system
- Highway system in Taiwan
← Prov 20	→ Prov 22

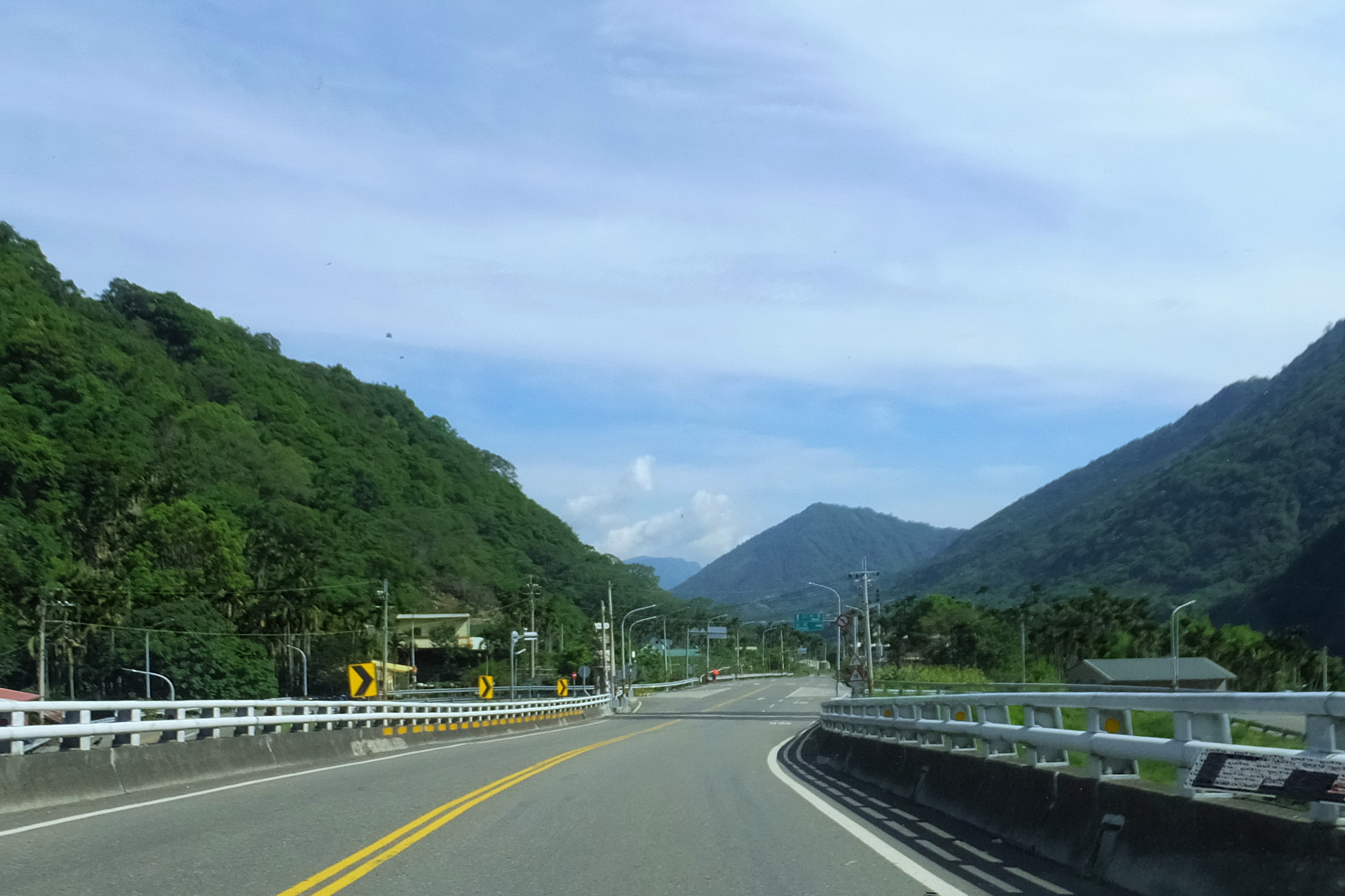
Highway 21

Taiwan Provincial Highway No. 21 is a Provincial Highway in Taiwan that begins at Tianleng (天冷), Dongshi District, Taichung City, at the intersection with Provincial Highway No. 8 (Central Cross-Island Highway), and ends at Tataka(塔塔加), where it is connected with Provincial Highway No. 18 (New Central Cross-Island Highway) in Yushan National Park. It is the primary highway to Sun Moon Lake, a popular tourist destination. The total length is 145 km.

A southern segment of the highway became Provincial Highway 29 in 2014. The segment was from Namasia to Linyuan in Kaohsiung City, and ran along the Cishan River(旗山溪) as well as the Gaoping River(高屏溪). The road between Tataka and Namasia was not built due to environmental and ecological issues.

== Route ==
Provincial Highway No. 21 begins at Dongshi District, Taichung City, then passes through Guoxing, Puli, Yuchih, Sun Moon Lake, Shuili, Xinyi, and ends in Tataka. Its length is 144.385 km.

The highway is a part of Fengpu Highway (豐埔公路) that runs from Fengyuan to Puli. The segment from Puli to Sun Moon Lake is a part of Zhongtan Highway (中潭公路), which connects downtown Taichung with the lake. The segment from Sun Moon Lake to Tataka is a part of the unfinished New Central Cross-Island Highway (新中橫公路). The cross-island highway plan was formally abandoned due to environmental concerns.

== Branch Line ==
The only branch line is named as Provincial Highway No. 21A, which is around the east side of Sun Moon Lake in Yuchih, Nantou County. Its length is 20.833 km.

== See also ==
- Highway system in Taiwan
- Provincial Highway 7, the Northern Cross-Island Highway
- Provincial Highway 8, the Central Cross-Island Highway
  - Provincial Highway 14
- New Central Cross-Island Highway
  - Provincial Highway 18
- Provincial Highway 20, the Southern Cross-Island Highway
