= Provincial Highway 14 (Taiwan) =

Provincial highway in Taiwan

Provincial Highway 14
- 台14線

Route information
- Maintained by Directorate General of Highways
- Length: 98.993 km (61.511 mi)

Major junctions
- West end: Prov 1 in Changhua
- Nat 3 in Caotun, Nantou; Nat 6 in Guoxing, Nantou and Puli, Nantou
- East end: Ren'ai, Nantou

Location
- Country: Taiwan

Highway system
- Highway system in Taiwan
← Prov 13	→ Prov 15

Provincial Highway 14 is an east–west highway that connects Changhua City in Changhua County with Ren'ai, an aboriginal township in Nantou County. The highway is known as Zhongtan Highway (中潭公路) from Caotun to Puli, and Puwu Highway from Puli to Ren'ai. The total length is 99.0 kilometers.

== Route description ==
The highway begins at the intersection of Provincial Highway 1 in Changhua City. The route continues eastbound towards the rural township of Fenyuan and enters Nantou County. After passing through the junctions of Freeway 3 and Provincial Highway 63, the highway enters downtown Caotun and becomes Zhongtan Highway. The stretch of highway between Caotun and Puli runs parallel to Freeway 6. In Puli the highway has a brief concurrency with Provincial Highway 21 before the latter turns southbound. Right before leaving Puli, the highway turns from a 4-lane to a 2-lane road. The route continues towards the mountainous aboriginal township of Ren'ai. In Ren'ai the highway passes through Wushe and Lushan Hot Spring. After passing through Lushan, the highway turns into a narrow 1-lane road before ending at Tunyuan (Tnpara), the western entrance of Nenggao Cross-ridge Historic Trail (能高越嶺古道), a historic route connecting between Nantou and Hualien.

The stretch between Lushan and Tunyuan, as well as the Nenggao Cross-ridge Historic Trail, require special permits to access. A planned extension of the highway to Xiulin, Hualien was unfinished due to environmental and economic concerns. In 2009, the extension plan was formally abandoned.

== Spur routes ==
- Provincial Highway 14A: The highway begins at its parent route in Wushe, a village in Ren'ai, Nantou, and ends at Provincial Highway 8 in Dayuling in Xiulin, Hualien. The highway provides access to the tourist attractions of Cingjing Farm and Hehuanshan, including the highest paved road in Taiwan at Wuling. The total length is 41.533 km.
- Provincial Highway 14B: The highway begins at its parent route in Fenyuan, Changhua, and ends at Provincial Highway 3 in Nantou City. The highway connects the cities of Changhua and Nantou. The total length is 18.29 km.
- Provincial Highway 14C: The highway is an alternate route that is located entirely in Changhua City. The total length is 2.882 km.
- Provincial Highway 14D: The highway begins at its parent route in Fenyuan, Changhua, and ends at Provincial Highway 3A in Nantou City. The highway is an alternate route between the cities of Changhua and Nantou. The total length is 10.156 km.

== See also ==
- Highway system in Taiwan
- Provincial Highway 7, the Northern Cross-Island Highway
- Provincial Highway 8, the Central Cross-Island Highway
- New Central Cross-Island Highway
  - Provincial Highway 18
  - Provincial Highway 21
- Provincial Highway 20, the Southern Cross-Island Highway
