= Central Cross-Island Highway =

Highway system in Taiwan

Provincial Highway 8
- 台8線
- Central Cross-Island Highway (中部橫貫公路)

Route information
- Maintained by Directorate General of Highways
- Length: 189.8 km (117.9 mi)

Major junctions
- West end: Prov 3 in Dongshi, Taichung
- East end: Prov 9 in Xincheng, Hualien

Location
- Country: Taiwan

Highway system
- Highway system in Taiwan
← Prov 7	→ Prov 9

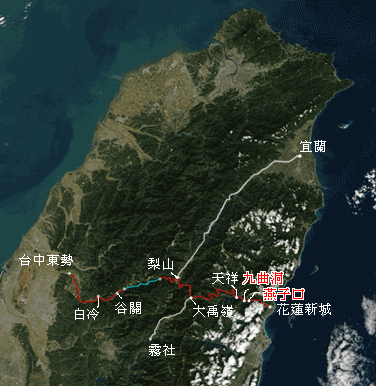
Central Cross-Island Highway (in red and blue). The route colored blue is permanently closed due to earthquake and typhoon damage.

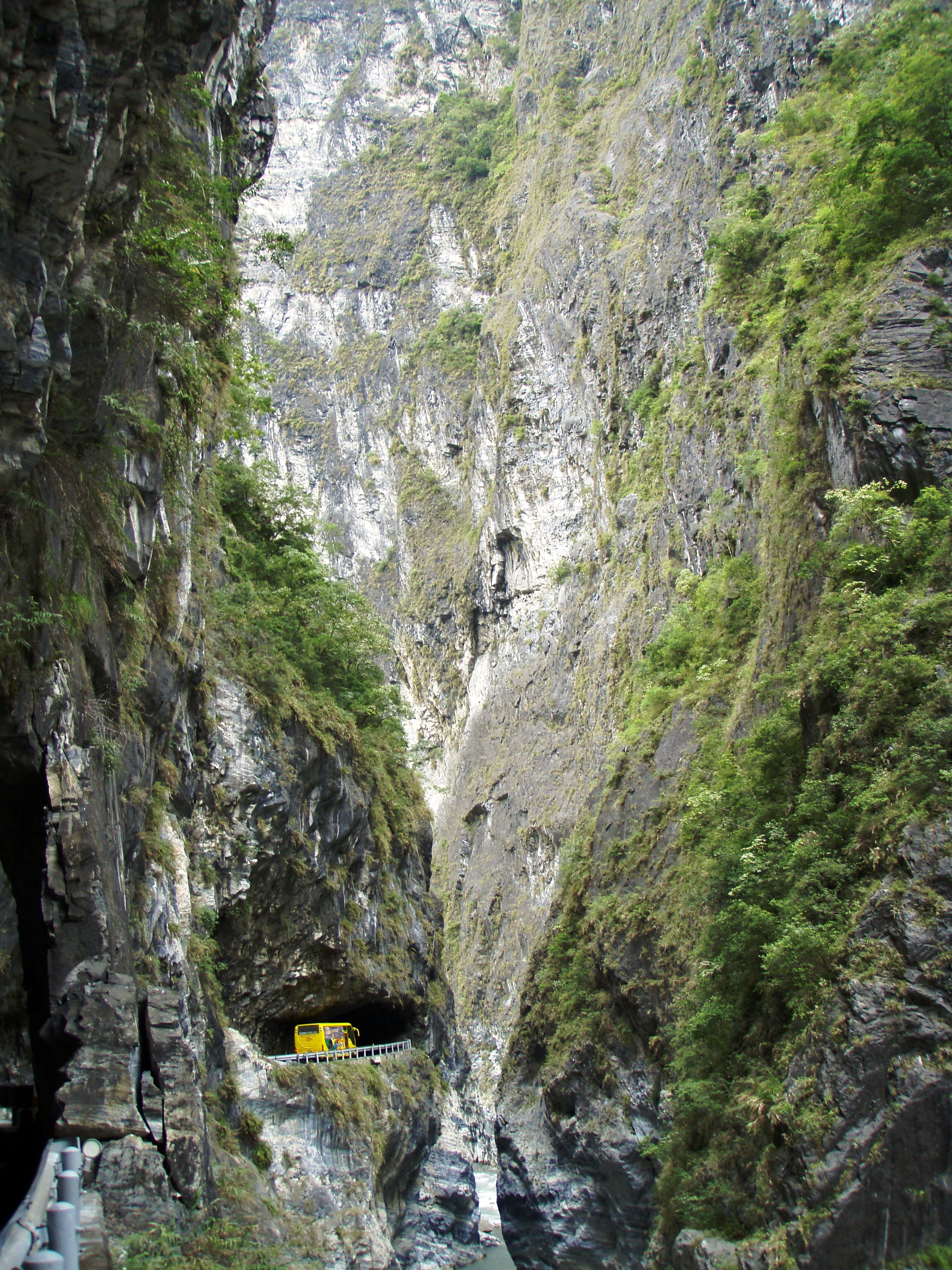

The Central Cross-Island Highway (Chinese: 中部橫貫公路) or Provincial Highway 8 is one of three highway systems that connect the west coast with the east of Taiwan.

== Construction ==
The construction of the Central Cross-Island Highway began on July 7, 1956 and was first opened to traffic on May 9, 1960.

== Route ==
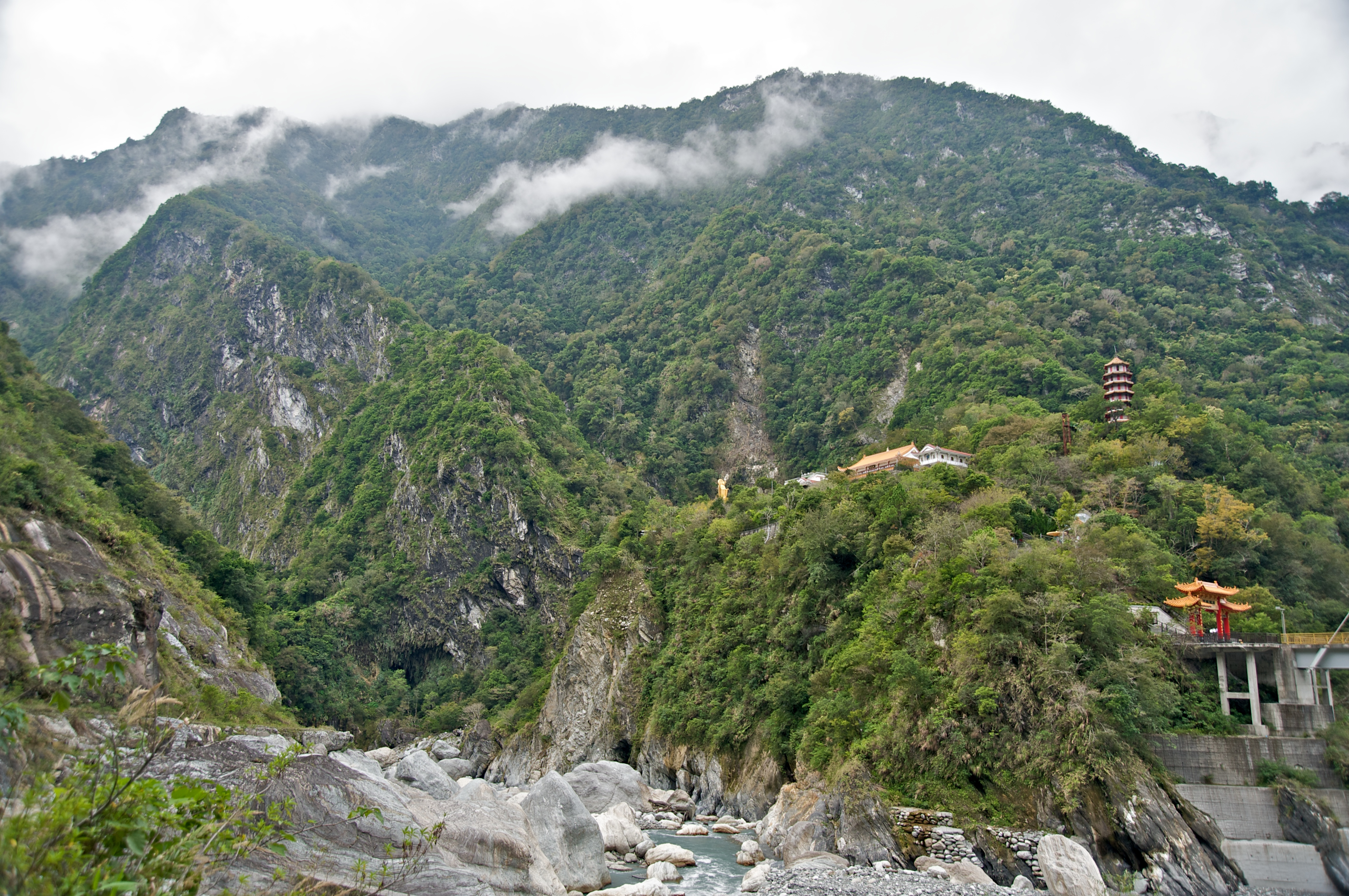

The route of the highway begins in the west at Dongshi District in Taichung. The highway originally continued up into the Central Mountain Range following the Dajia River valley through the townships of Guguan (谷關) and Qingshan (青山). However, the section between Guguan and Lishan is permanently closed to non-residents due to earthquake and typhoon damage. At Lishan there is a branch that heads north to Yilan City. Passing through the mountains it reaches Dayuling (大禹嶺) which is the highest point of the route. Here another branch of the highway runs south from Dayuling to Puli via Wuling (武嶺). Continuing east from Dayuling the highway route now begins its descent into the Taroko National Park. It passes through Guanyuan (關原), Ci'en (慈恩), Luoshao (洛韶) and Tianxiang before entering Taroko Gorge. After the gorge the route then connects with the eastern coastal Suhua Highway.

== Highway damage and closure ==
The highway route runs through exceedingly rugged and unstable terrain. Heavy rain from typhoons often dislodge soil and rocks onto the highway making sections of it impassable. As well, the area is prone to seismic activity which can have disastrous effects on the highway. On September 21, 1999 the Jiji earthquake caused massive damage to the highway and cut the highway in multiple places between Guguan and Lishan.

Following the unprecedented damage to the highway in 1999, there was strong debate on the feasibility and desirability of maintaining and repairing the highway. Extensive and costly repairs proceeded, and earthquake-damaged sections of the highway were due to be re-opened in 2004. However, torrential rains from Typhoon Mindulle caused further damage to the highway, forcing the affected section between Guguan and Lishan to be closed to non-residents indefinitely. While Provincial Highway 8 no longer provides a continuous route across the island, travelers from the west can use Provincial Highway 14 and Provincial Highway 14A to connect with Provincial Highway 8 in the east.

On November 16, 2018, the section between Guguan and Lishan re-opened to limited traffic. 3 medium-sized busses are scheduled to run the route (back and forth) each day but no ordinary private vehicle traffic is allowed.

== Gallery ==
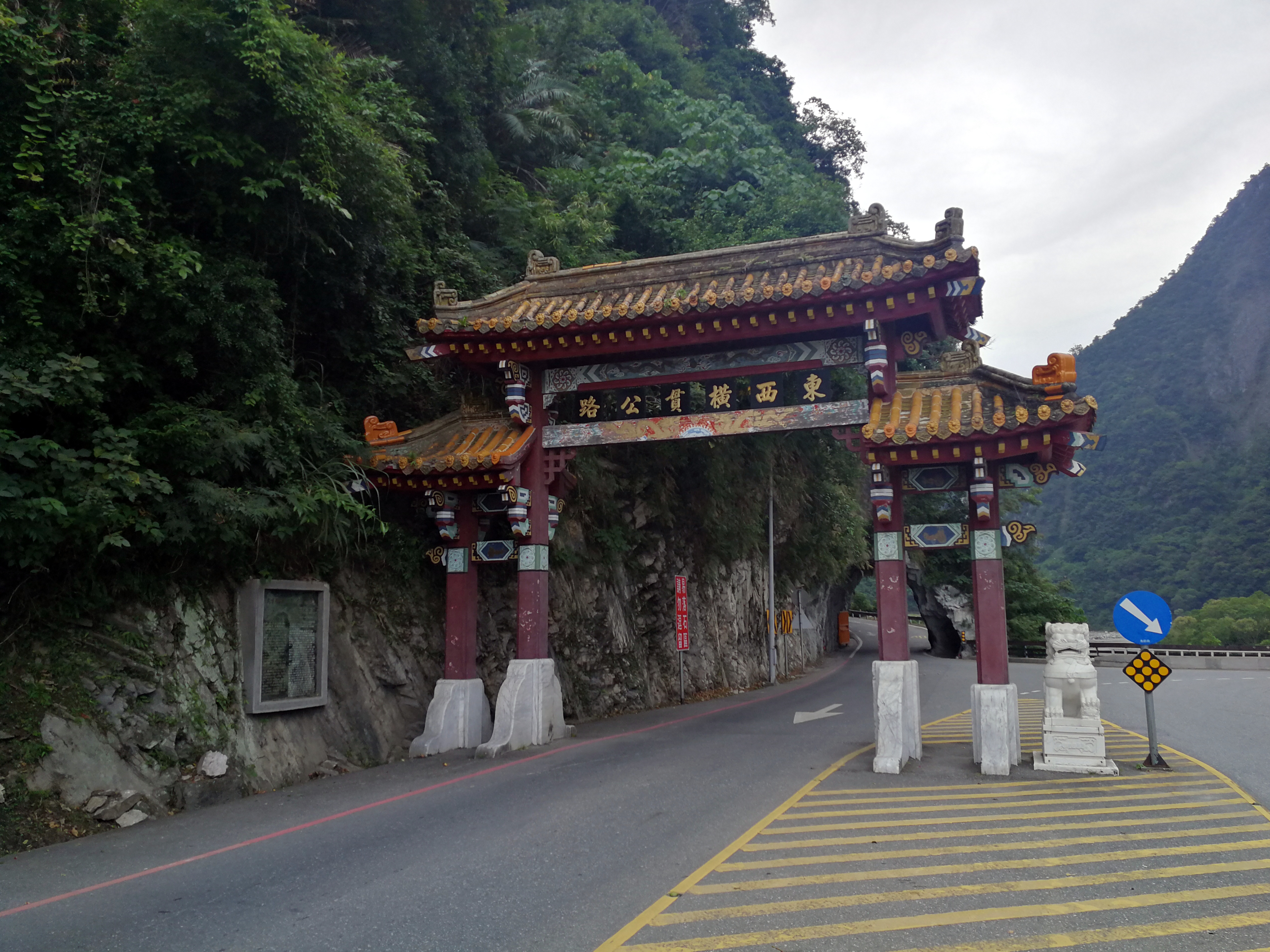
Entrance of Central Cross-Island Highway

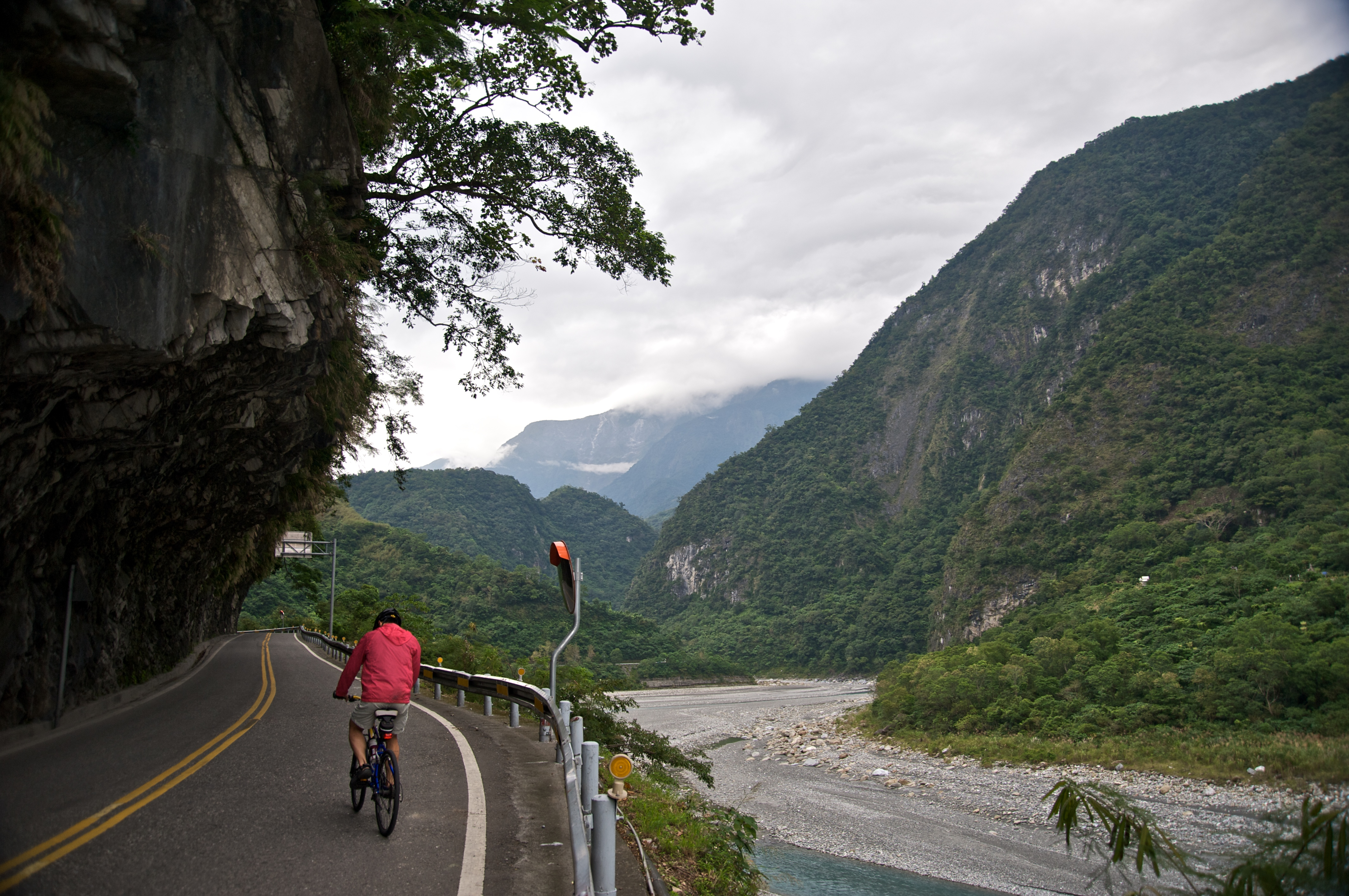
Bicycling uphill at Taroko Gorge

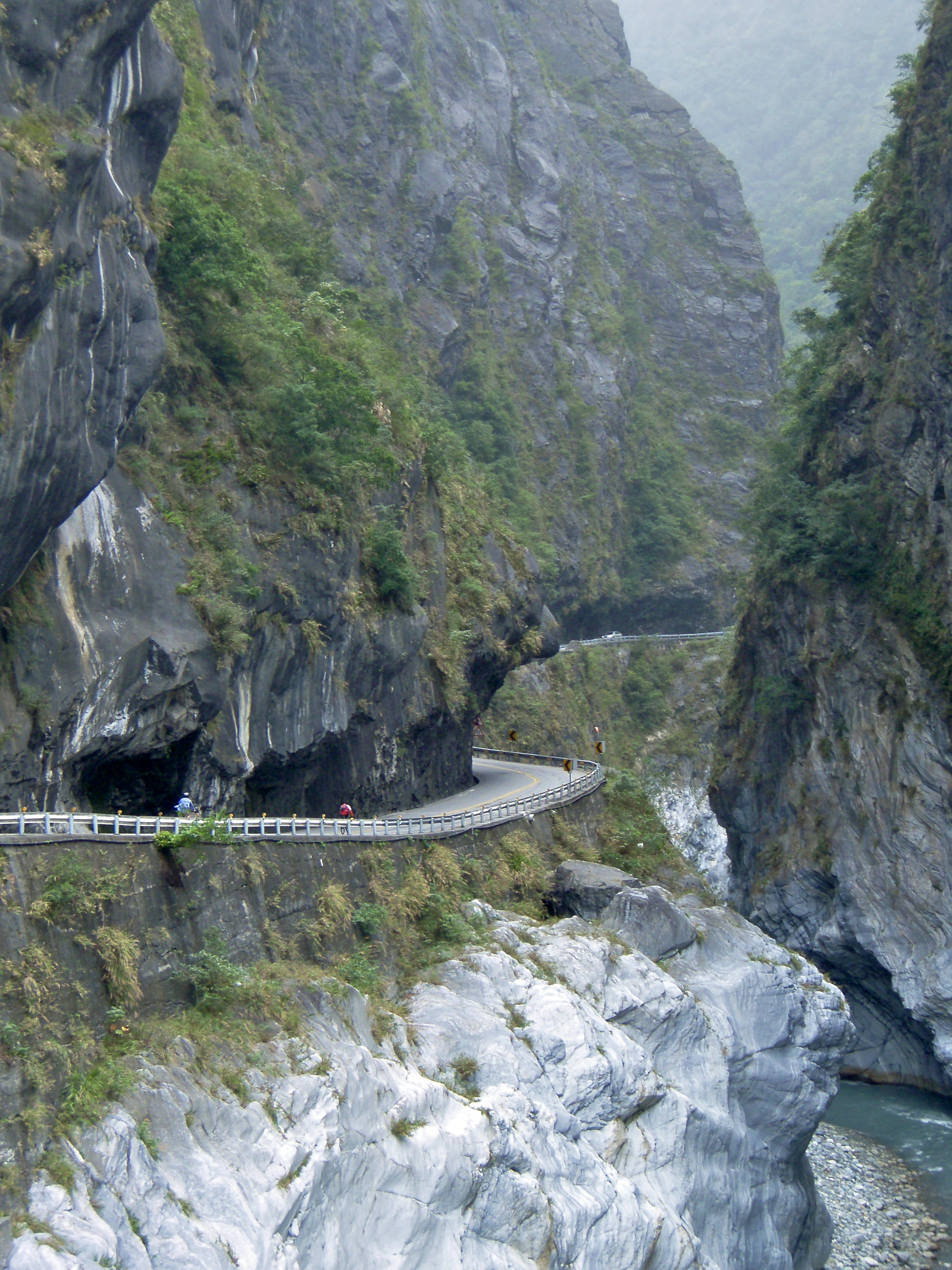
Bicyclists share narrow roads with motor vehicles

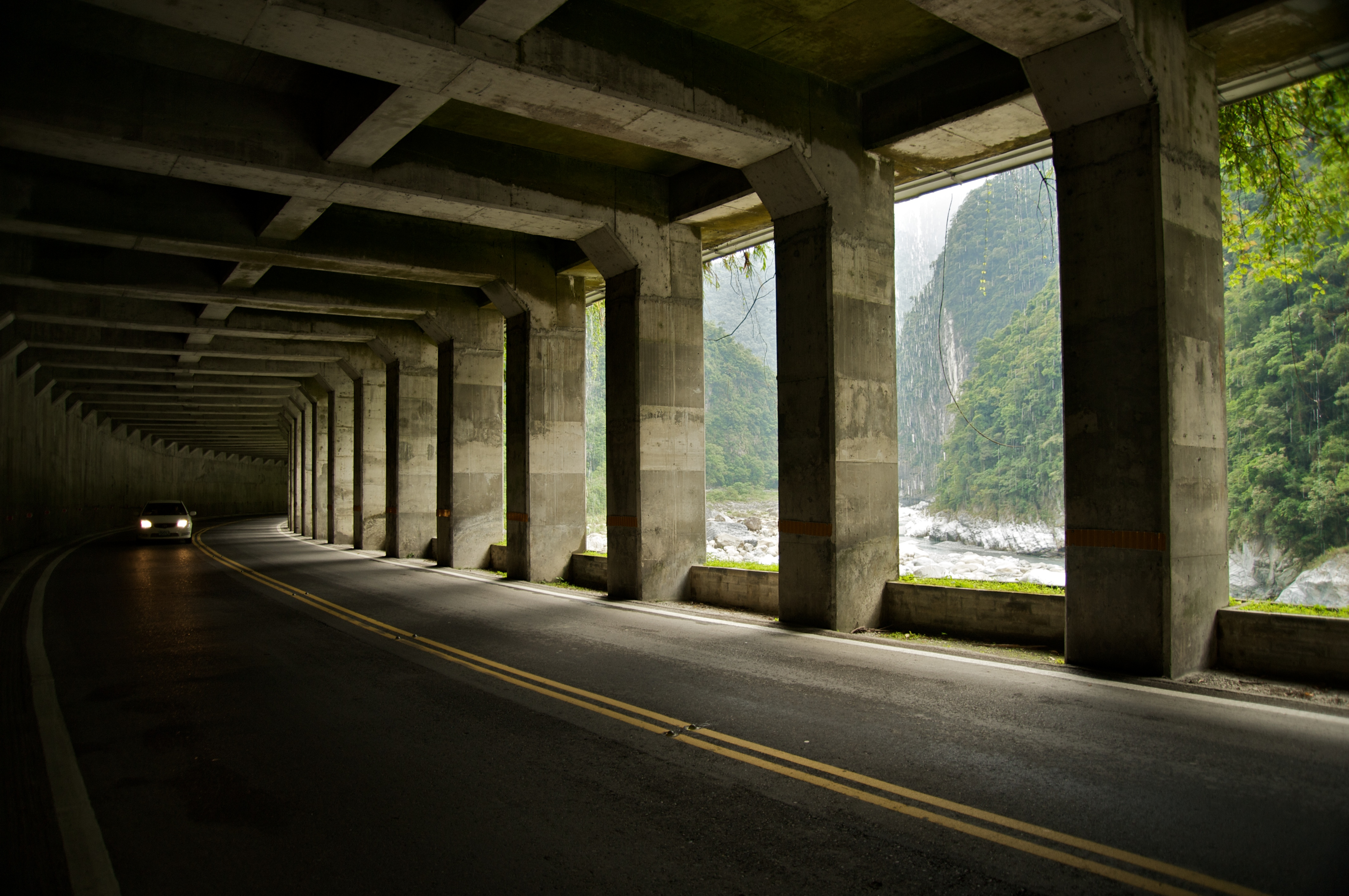
Protection from waterfalls

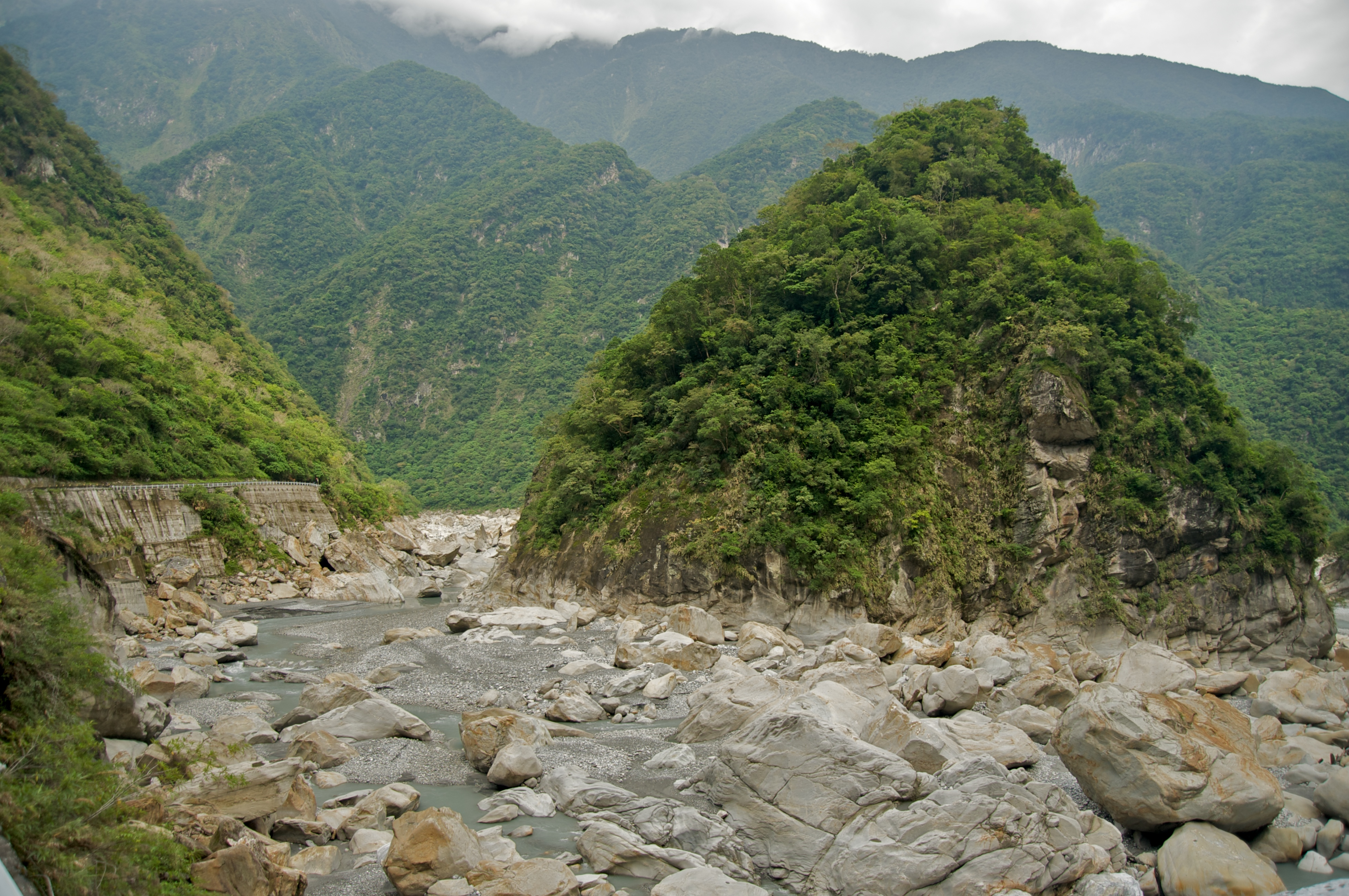
Gorge views

== See also ==
- Highway system in Taiwan
- Provincial Highway 7, the Northern Cross-Island Highway
- Provincial Highway 14 and 14A
- New Central Cross-Island Highway
  - Provincial Highway 18
  - Provincial Highway 21
- Provincial Highway 20, the Southern Cross-Island Highway
