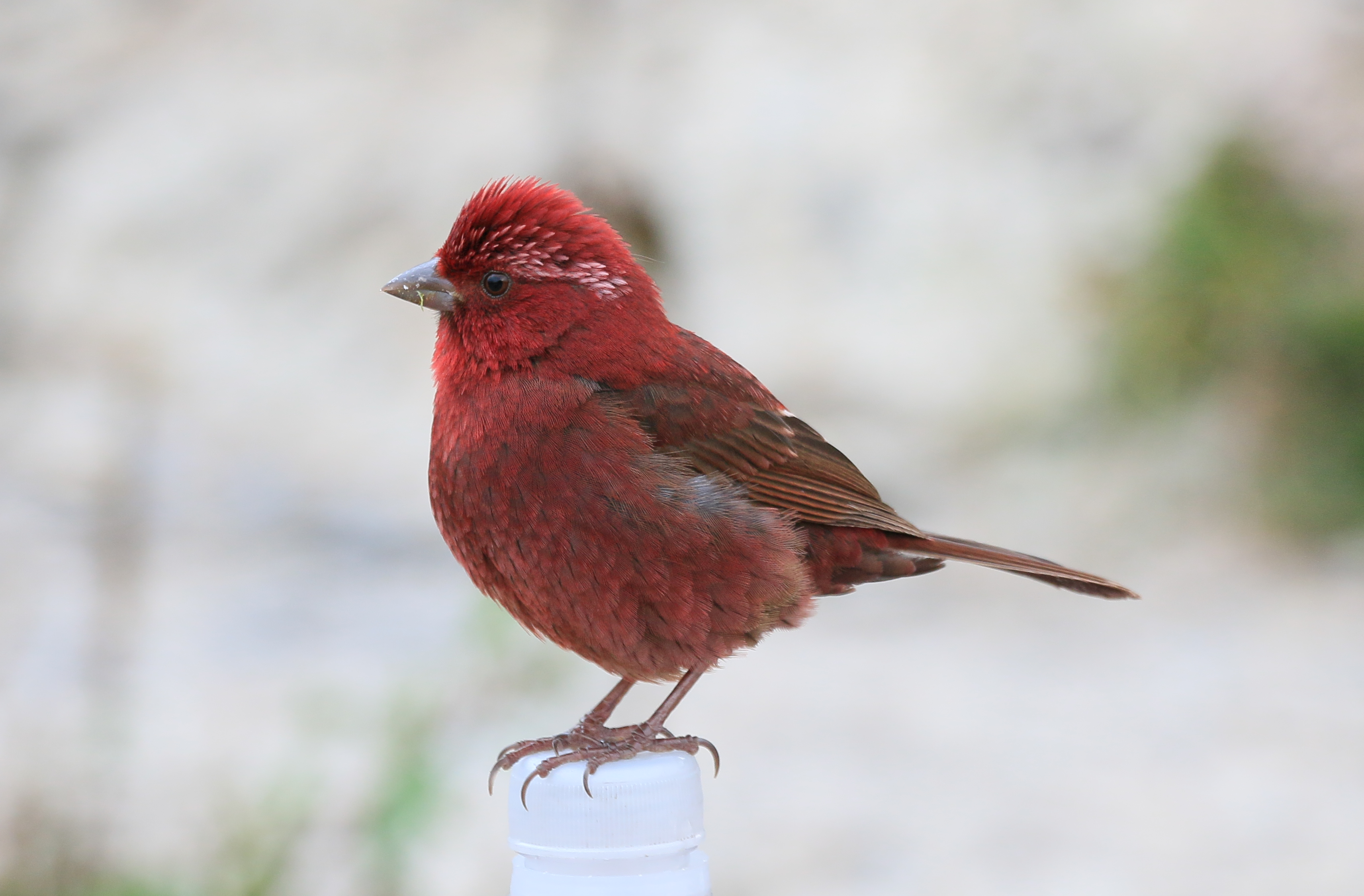

Conservation status
- Least Concern (IUCN 3.1)

Scientific classification
- Kingdom: Animalia
- Phylum: Chordata
- Class: Aves
- Order: Passeriformes
- Family: Fringillidae
- Subfamily: Carduelinae
- Genus: Carpodacus
- Species: C. formosanus

Binomial name
- Carpodacus formosanus Ogilvie-Grant, 1911

= Taiwan rosefinch =

Species of bird

The Taiwan rosefinch (Carpodacus formosanus) is a species of finch in the family Fringillidae. It was formerly considered a subspecies of the vinaceous rosefinch. It is endemic to Taiwan. Its natural habitats are temperate forests and subtropical or tropical dry forests.
