= Five-year Plan to Control the Aborigines =

Military plan to submit the Taiwanese aboriginals to Japanese occupation

The "Five-year Plan to Control the Aborigines" was a program aimed to use military force to suppress the aborigine populations in Taiwan during the early years of the Japanese rule. It was enacted by the fifth Taiwanese governor general, Sakuma Samata from 1910 to 1915.

In the year of 1906, General of the imperial Japanese army Sakuma Samata became the fifth governor general of Taiwan. In 1909, Sakuma created the Bureau of Aboriginal Affairs as a part of the Civil Administration Bureau and established local aboriginal offices in different regions among Taiwan and assigned aboriginal duties to local administrators, as a result of preparation on further soon to be enacted aboriginal governance program. He then drafted the ‘Five-year plan of aboriginal governance’ in 1910 with a budget of 16.3 million Yuan, aimed to make all the aborigines who were living in the mountain regions pledge their allegiance to the Japanese ruling force with the use of military and armed forces in 5 years.

== Background ==
In the nineteenth century, mountain areas in Taiwan contained wealth of natural resources yet to be developed. Forest and mineral products became a tempting treasure for Japan. However, those areas were traditionally the hunting field and possession of the Taiwanese aborigines. Among the east part of Taiwan and most of the mountainous areas were treated as the aboriginal areas under the Qing rule. When the First Sino-Japanese War ended in 1895, the Chinese Qing government signed on the treaty of Shimonoseki, and abandoned Taiwan. From 1895, Taiwan became an imperial Japanese colony. Japan had conflicts with the Taiwanese aborigines since the pre-Sino-Japanese war, so called the Mudan Incident of 1871. 54 Japanese had been killed by the Taiwanese aborigines. This incident ended with the victory of Japan’s well trained and equipped military force. The leader of the Japanese side was Satsuma Samata, later the fifth Governor General. Aborigines in Taiwan who traditionally live in the mountains were regarded as barbaric and ruthless in Japan’s colonizers’ minds. In the beginning of the twentieth century, Imperial Japan’s administration among Taiwan’s cities and towns had been settled and established for some years since occupation. Violent resistance and uprisings had decreased due to the huge disparity between the Japanese military force and the Taiwanese local people. The colonial government then had the necessity to focus more on the administration over the mountains.

== The plan ==
From the beginning of the plan, Japanese colonial government had decided to adopt a violent way to force the aborigines to obey. Sakuma was assigned to implement the plan due to his experience to fight with the aborigines during the Mudan incident. Sakuma started to enact the program of five years plan for governing aborigines after he took the position as the governor general. The plan aimed to control and administer the mountain areas within 5 years. It predicted that it would take one to two years for the Japanese military force to mop up the northern side of aborigines. At the same time, they were to develop the frontier guard system comprehensively, whilst first to reassure the aborigines among the southern regions of Taiwan. While the military force mop up the north, they would then laying roads on the mountains and investigate the terrain features in the south and information about the southern aborigines for the future use of the mop up to the south. In the third year, they would use to maximum force possible to attack the 'Taroko aborigines'. During the fourth year, comprehensive attacks to the southern and eastern regions and its aborigines were to begin. There would be a central east to west road to be built, and a transport route for the development of the eastern part of Taiwan would be established. During the fifth year, the final year of the plan, the frontier guard lines would then be reformed as permanent roads.

== Implementation ==
The actual implementation of the plan began during April 1910. The Tayal (Atayal) tribe were the first of the northern aborigines to be mopped up. However, the Japanese military force met with the much greater resistance than they had expected, so they greatly increased the number of troops. The Japanese committed many atrocities, especially in their campaign against the Slamaw area. The Truku (Taroko) tribe put up such fierce resistance that the Japanese realized they could not quell the aborigines in just five years. More time was needed. Plans to suppress and develop southern and eastern tribes were carried out hurriedly. When the Truku tribe was finally vanquished, Sakuma went back to Japan to report the completion of the aboriginal governance plan to the Meiji Emperor, and then resigned as the governor general of Taiwan.

== Result ==
Ando Teibi as the successor of Sakuma who became the sixth governor general of Taiwan in April 1915 ceased the 'Bureau of Aboriginal Affairs' and returns the aborigines' administration to the police bureau of mountainous areas, ending the armed suppression policy of the aboriginal governance.

== See also ==
- Japanese occupation of Taiwan
- Taiwanese aborigines#Japanese rule
