= Provincial Highway 7 (Taiwan) =

Road in Taiwan

Provincial Highway 7
- 台7線
- Northern Cross-Island Highway (北部橫貫公路)

Route information
- Maintained by Directorate General of Highways
- Length: 128.396 km (79.782 mi)
- Existed: May 1963–present

Major junctions
- West end: Prov 3 in Daxi, Taoyuan
- Nat 5 in Yilan City
- East end: Prov 2 in Zhuangwei, Yilan

Location
- Country: Taiwan

Highway system
- Highway system in Taiwan
← Prov 6	→ Prov 8

Provincial Highway 7 (Chinese: 台7線) is a highway connecting Daxi, Taoyuan and Zhuangwei, Yilan. The highway is also known as Northern Cross-Country Highway (Chinese: 北部橫貫公路), one of the three most important east–west highways in Taiwan.

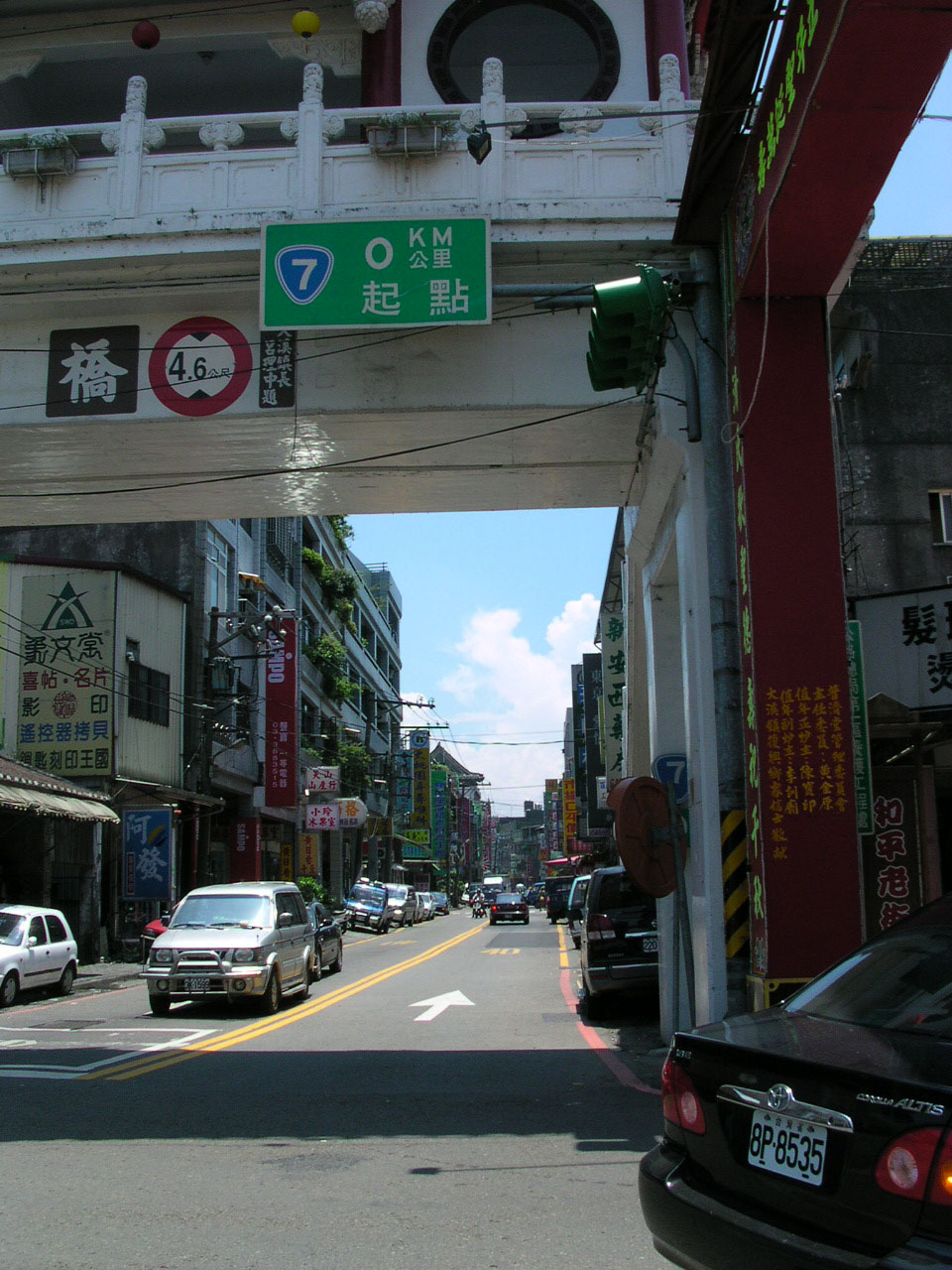
Western terminus of Highway 7 in Daxi.

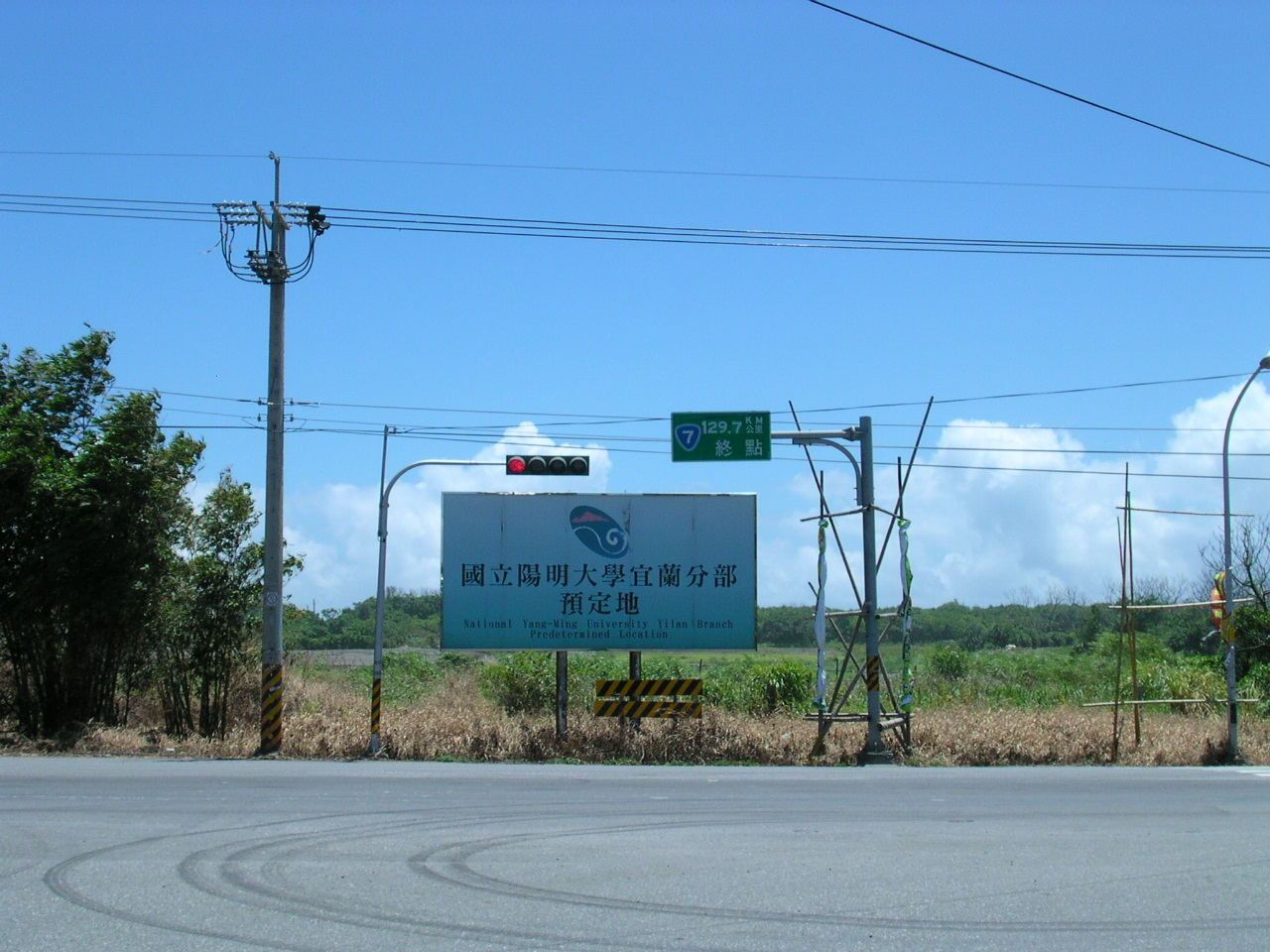
Eastern terminus of Highway 7 in Zhuangwei.

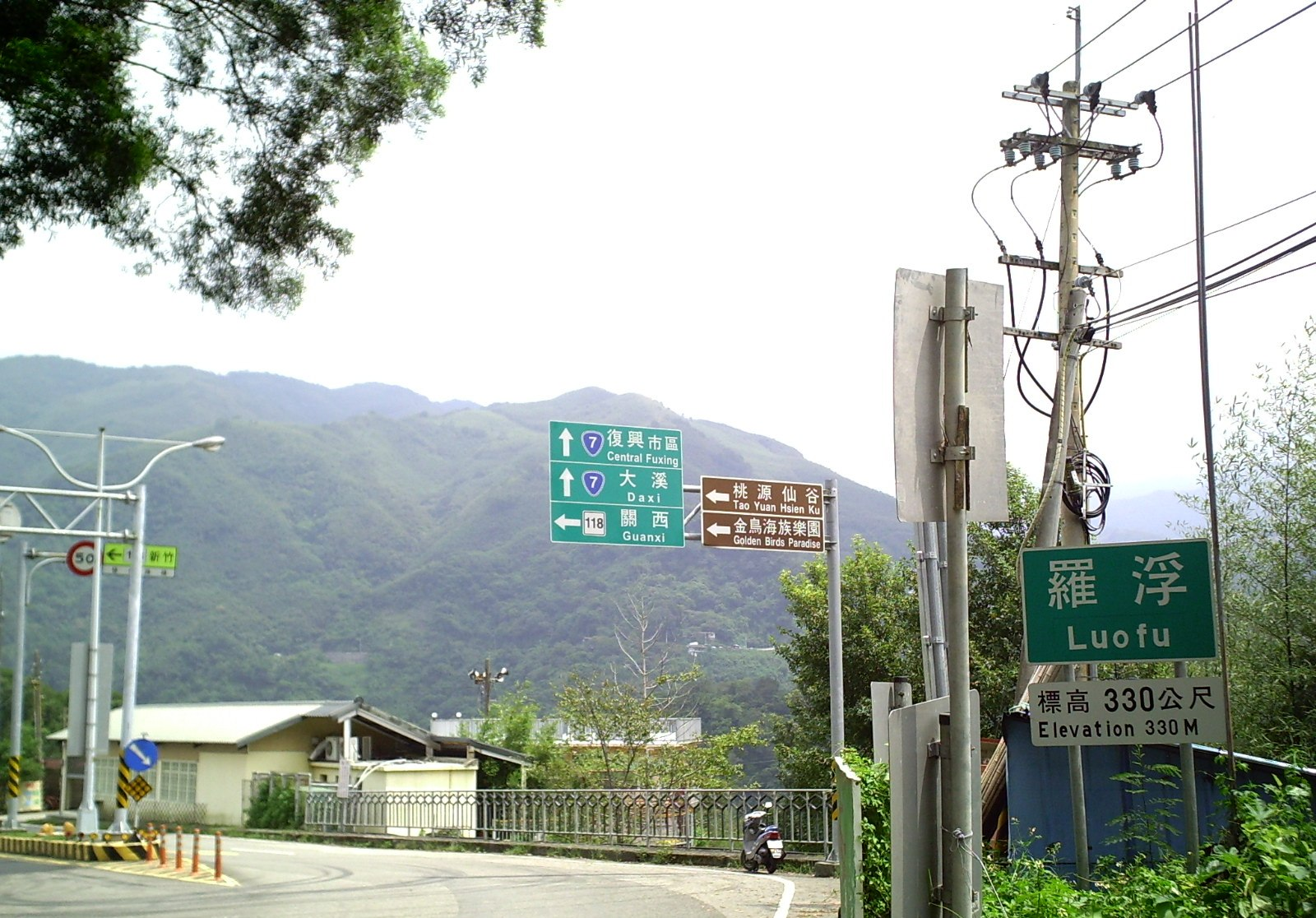
Highway 7 at the junction of County Road 118 (LuoMa Highway) in Luofu, Taoyuan

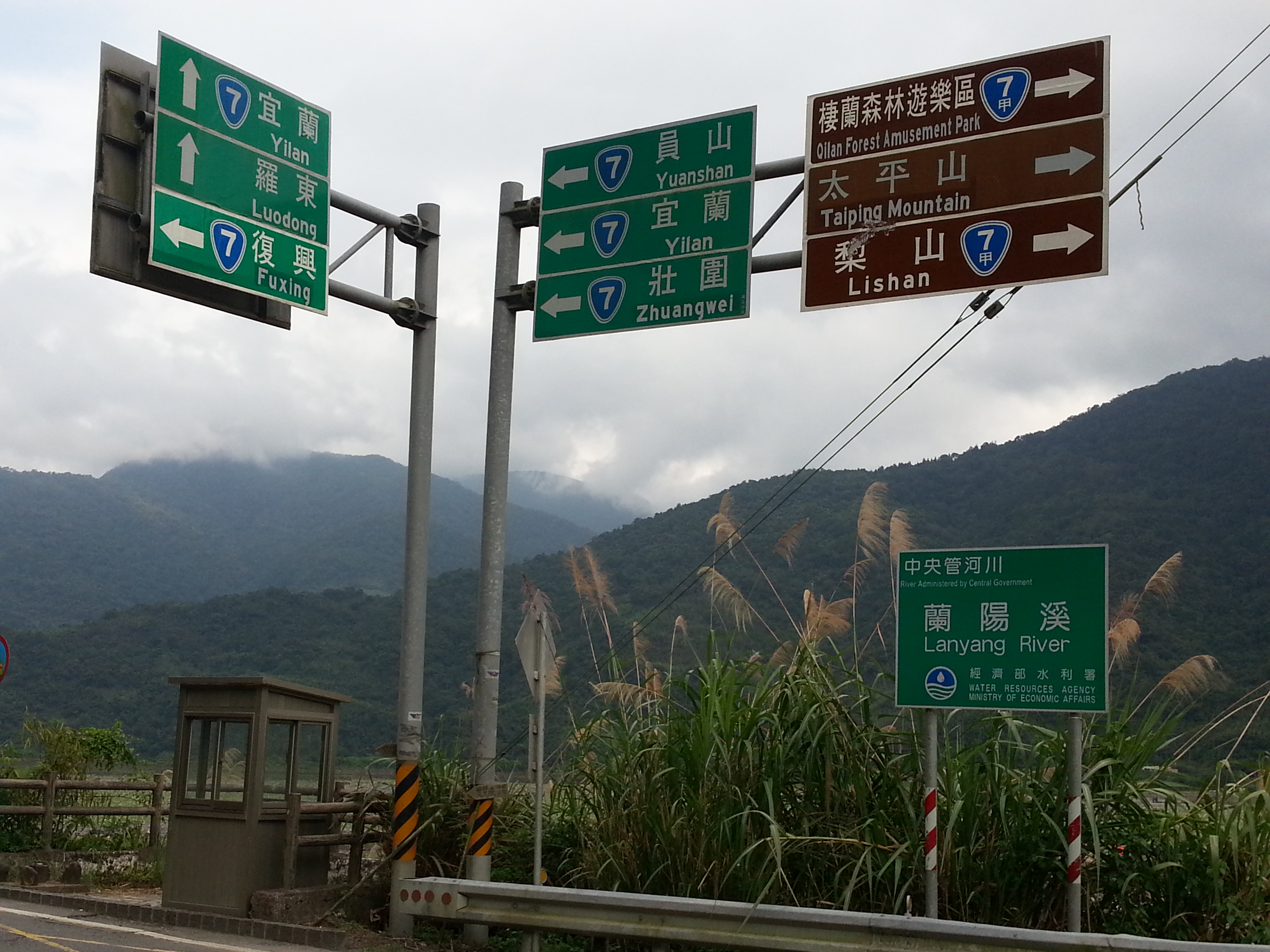
Highway 7 at the junction of Highway 7a in Qilan, Yilan County

== Route description ==
The highway begins at the junction of Highway 3 in Daxi. The route then passes through Cihu Mausoleum, the tombs of the late presidents Chiang Kai-shek and Chiang Ching-Kuo. After the intersection with Highway 7B, the route enters the aboriginal district of Fuxing in Taoyuan City. At Luofu village (羅浮, Rahao) in Fuxing, the highway passes through the intersection with County Road 118, a popular scenic route also known as LuoMa Highway (羅馬公路).

Starting from Fuxing, the road becomes a narrow and winding 1-lane highway as it crosses the Xueshan Range. The highway passes through numerous tribal villages along the way. The highway then enters Datong, Yilan, which is also an aboriginal township. At Datong, the highway passes through Mingchi Forest Recreational Area (明池國家森林遊樂區) and Qilan Forest Recreational Area (棲蘭國家森林遊樂區). The highway has a junction with Highway 7a in the Qilan area and another with Highway 7c near Yingshi village (英士村), both located in Datong. The highway then follows the Lanyang River and continues to Yuanshan, Yilan and Yilan City. At Yilan City, the highway intersects with PH 9 and Freeway 5 before ending at PH 2 in Zhuangwei. At some points (such as in Sileng (roughly at the 58-59km mark)) the road has an elevation of 1170 meters.

== Spur routes ==
- Prov 7A The highway runs from its parent route at Qilan in Datong, Yilan to PH 8 at Lishan (梨山) in Heping District. It is also known as the Yilan branch of the Central Cross-Island Highway (中橫公路宜蘭支線). The total length is 73.988 km.
- Prov 7B The highway runs from PH 3 in Sanxia, New Taipei City to its parent route in Fuxing District. It was assigned as part of Highway 7 until the segment between Daxi and Fuxing opened. The total length is 14.15 km.
- Prov 7C The highway runs from its parent route in Datong, Yilan to Highway 2E in Wujie, Yilan, passing through Sanxing, Yilan, Dongshan, Yilan, and Luodong, Yilan. The highway links the township in central Yilan plains to the cross-island highway. The total length is 31.337 km.
- Prov 7D The highway runs from Yuanshan, Yilan to Yilan City. It was originally planned to extend to Wulai, New Taipei City but was not built. The total length is 16.153 km. Before 2014, the route was Highway 9A.

== See also ==
- Highway system in Taiwan
- Provincial Highway 8, the Central Cross-Island Highway
  - Provincial Highway 14 and 14A
- New Central Cross-Island Highway
  - Provincial Highway 18
  - Provincial Highway 21
- Provincial Highway 20, the Southern Cross-Island Highway
