= Liwu River =

River in Hualien County, Taiwan

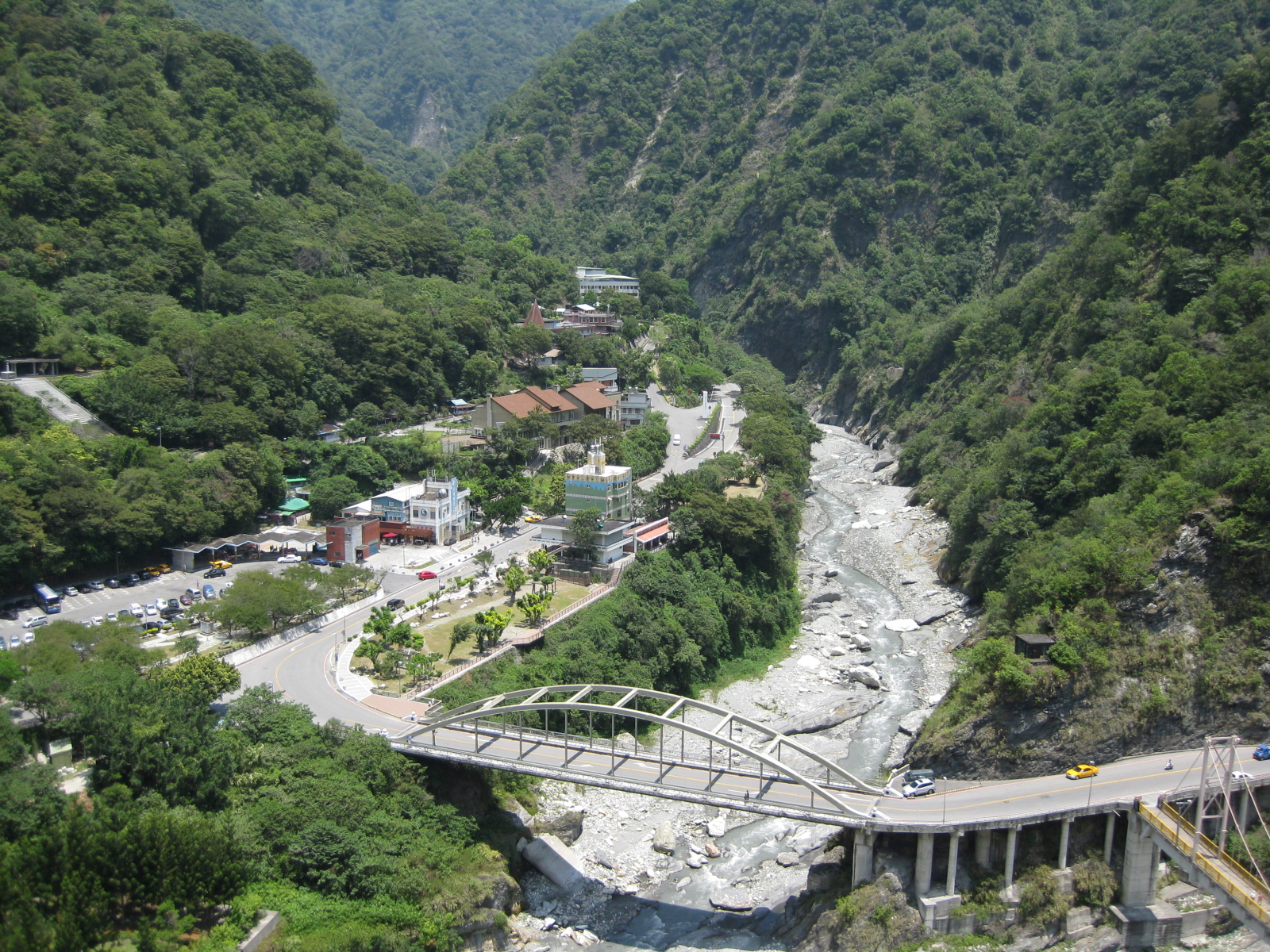
- The Liwu River flowing past Tianxiang
- Native name: 立霧溪 (Chinese)

Location
- Country: Taiwan
- County: Hualien County

Physical characteristics
- Source: Hehuanshan and Qilai Mountain
  - location: Xiulin, Hualien
- Mouth: Pacific Ocean
  - location: Xiulin, Hualien
  - coordinates: 24.1400°N 121.6608°E
- Length: 55 km (34 mi)
- Basin size: 616.3 km^{2} (238.0 sq mi)

Basin features
- Tributaries
  - left: Shatudang River

The Liwu River (Chinese: 立霧溪; pinyin: Lìwùxī) is a river entirely located in Xiulin Township, Hualien County, Taiwan. The deep gorges of Taroko National Park are formed by this river.

== Etymology ==
The origin of "Liwu" comes from the Taroko word "Tkijig", which referred to the river and the current settlement of Chongde. During Japan's rule over the island, the word was transliterated into "Takkiri" (立霧). Then, the kanji was adopted into Chinese, hence the name. Notably, "Tkijig" is also transliterated into Chinese for the names of two tributaries of the Liwu River: the Tacijili River (塔次基里溪) and the Dazili River (達梓里溪).

== Course ==
The source of the Liwu River is located between Hehuanshan and Qilai Mountain in the Central Mountain Range. From an elevation of 3,000 m, the river flows west until Tianxiang, where it enters Taroko Gorge. After collecting the Shatudang River near Changchun Shrine, the Liwu River ends in the Pacific Ocean near Chongde, a settlement occupied by the Taroko people. The length of the river is around 55 km and is entirely located within Taroko National Park. Much of the eastern section of the Central Cross-Island Highway follows the river.

The Liwu River has changed course three times: the first was due to stream capture over time, and the next two were due to landslide dams. These changes formed many of the fluvial terraces where human settlements are located today.

== History ==
The first human settlers along the Liwu River likely originated from the Shisanhang Culture in Northern Taiwan around 1,300 years ago, evidenced by fourteen ruins found near the mouth of the river. Like their northern counterparts, these people mastered smelting and used iron tools, but also mined gold. This was discovered by Spanish and Dutch forces in the 16th and 17th century, who noted that the river was named "Tackili" and named the area "Turoboan". Domingo Aguilar, a Spaniard, described that a tribe named Parrougearon (also known as Mek-qaolin) lived upstream, and three different tribes near the delta: the Pabanangh, Dadangh, and Torrobouan. The Dutch led several expeditions to this region in search of gold, but did not find a substantial amount.

Around 300 years ago, a group of Taroko people traveled from present-day Nantou County across the Central Mountain Range into the Liwu River valley due to overcrowding. Heading east to west, the Taroko's influence spread all the way to the Pacific, until the Truku War with the Japanese forced many of its population into the plains. The Japanese also established a path for easy access in accordance to the five years plan to governing aborigines.

== Gallery ==
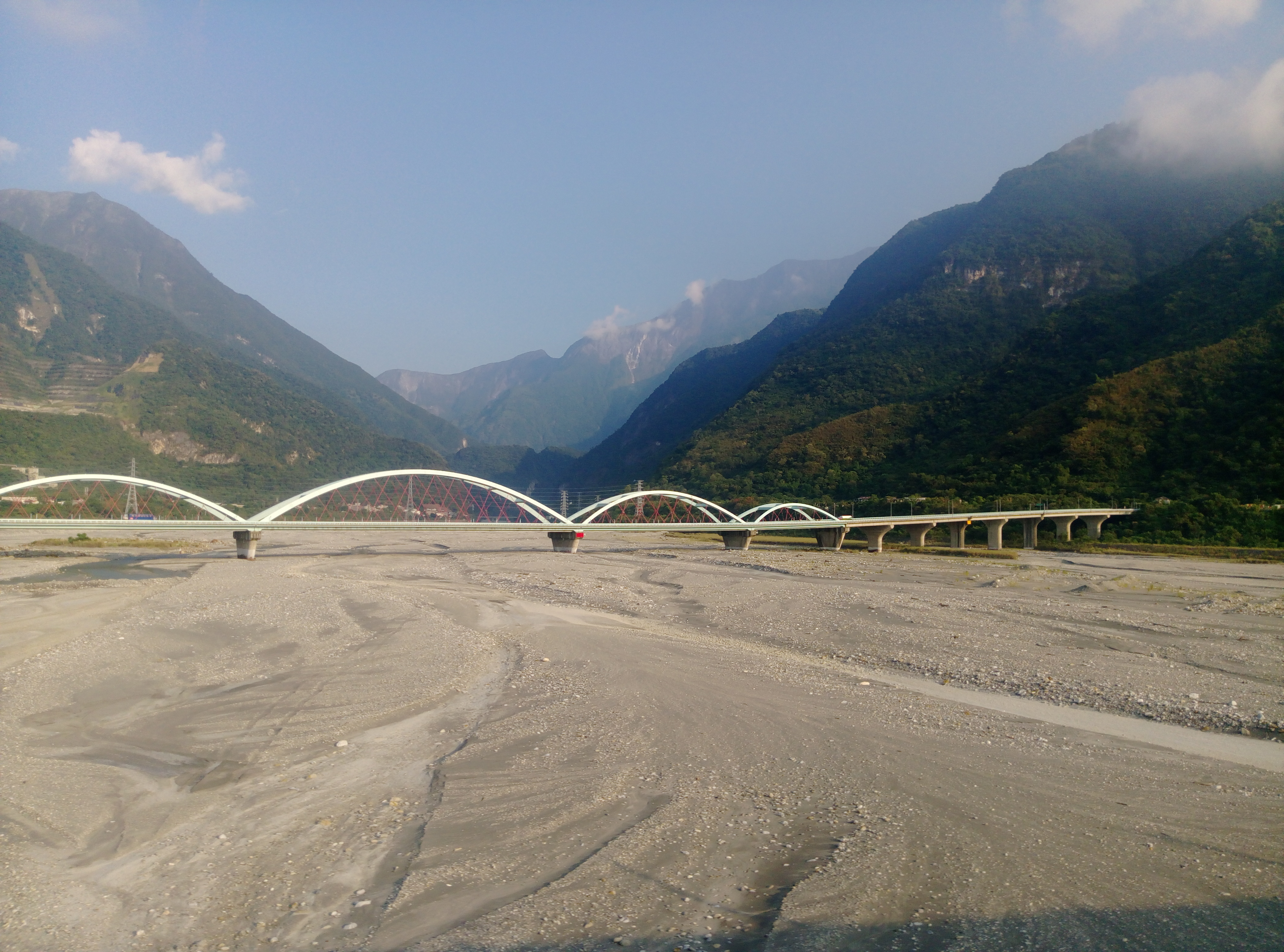
The Taroko Gate Bridge, located near the river's mouth.

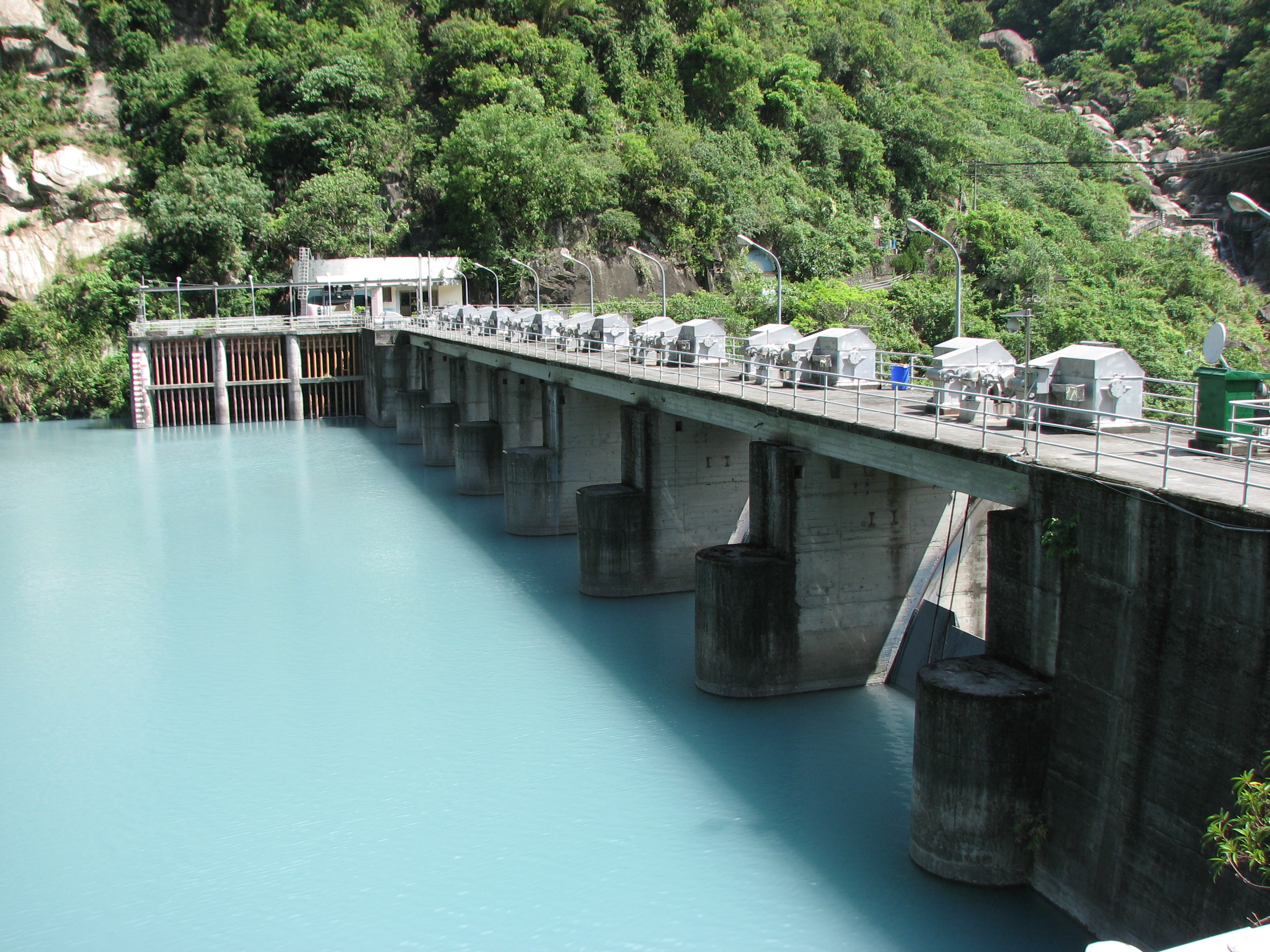
Xipan Dam, which generates hydroelectricity

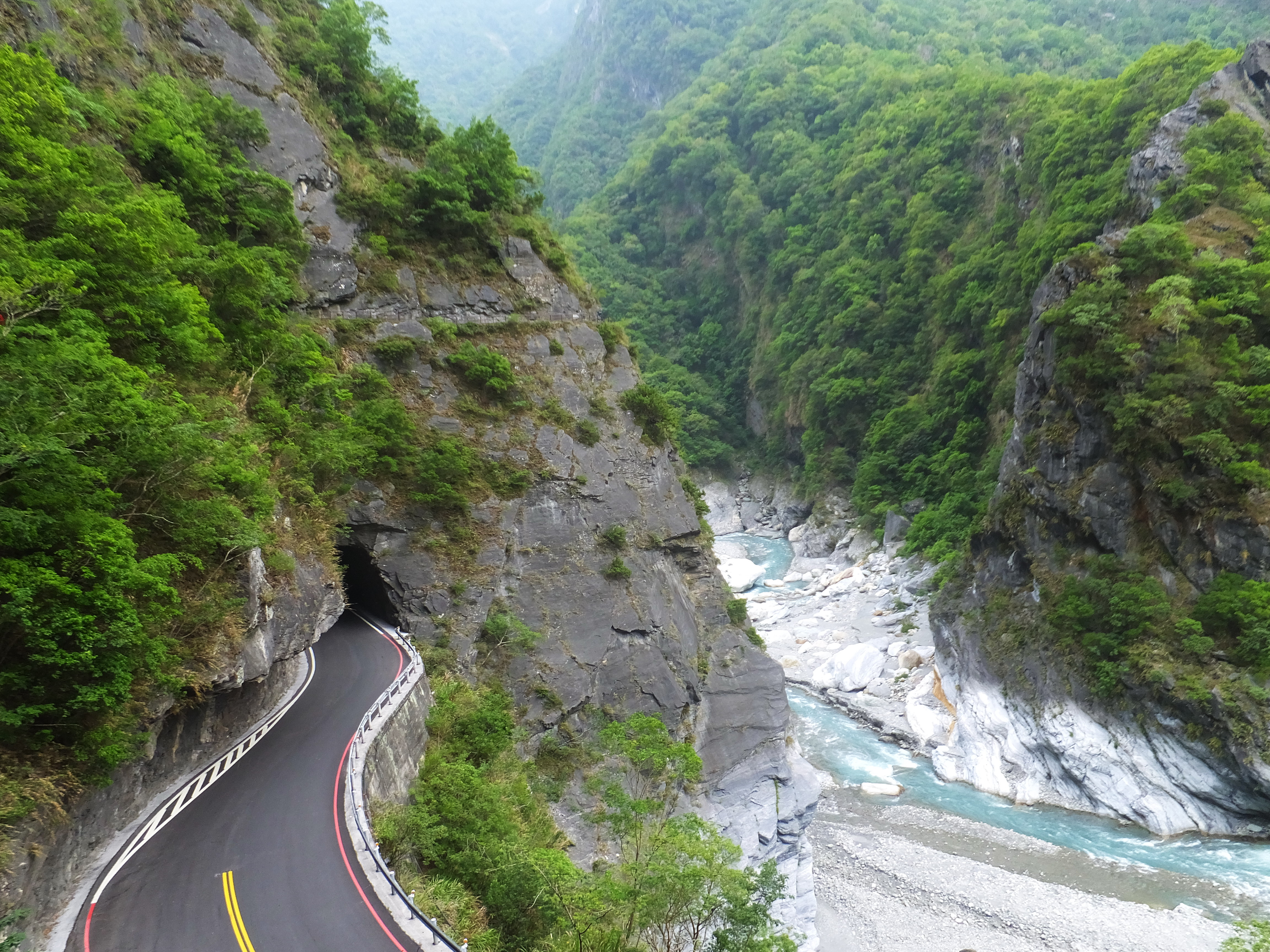
Liwu River with the Central Cross-Island Highway
