= Taroko National Park =

National park in Taiwan

- IUCN category II (national park)
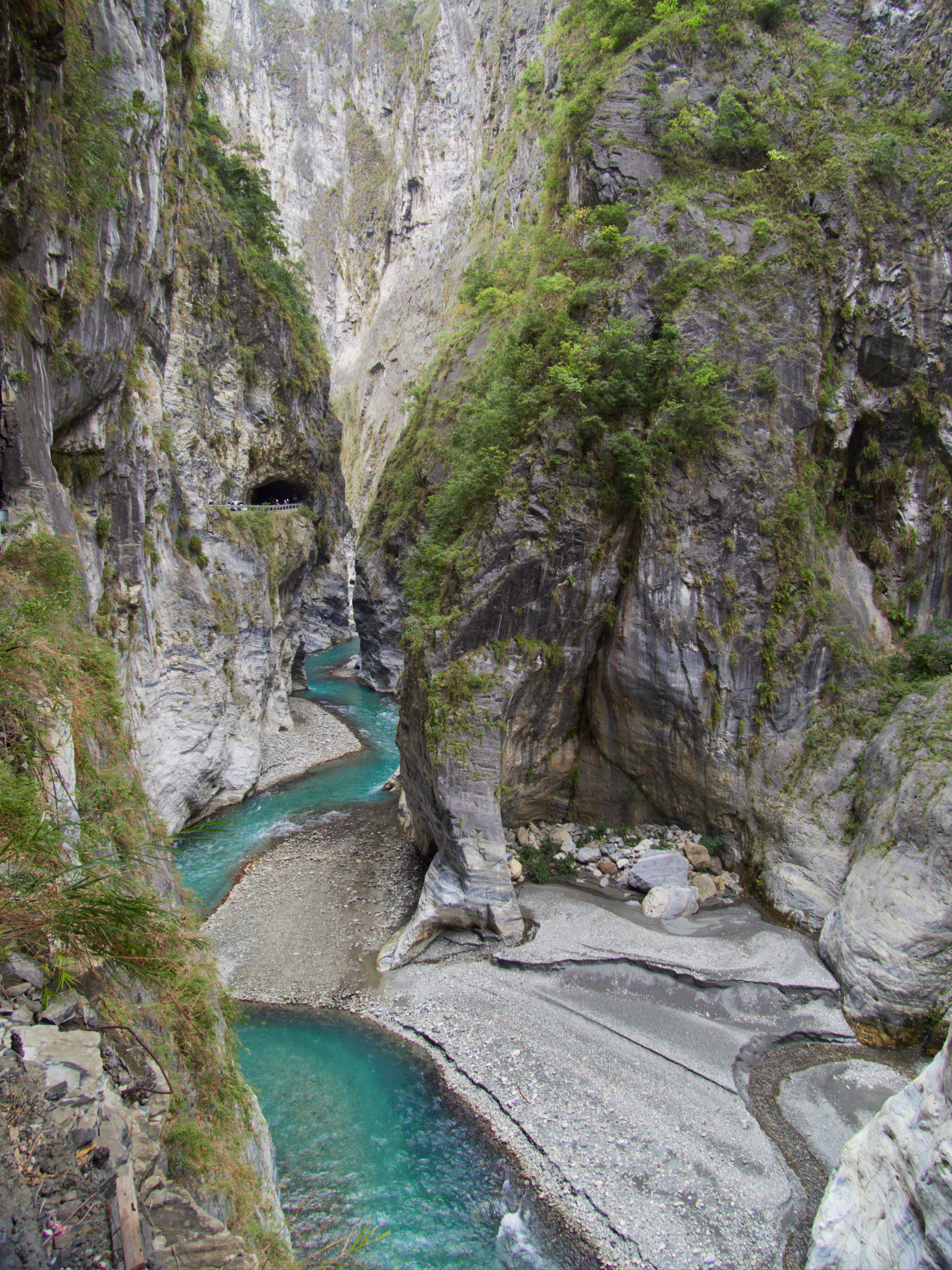
- Taroko Gorge, March 2024, a week before the earthquake

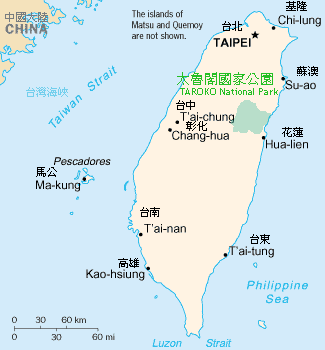
- Location of Taroko National Park
- Location: Taiwan
- Nearest city: Xiulin, Hualien
- Coordinates: 24°10′N 121°20′E
- Area: 920 km^{2} (360 sq mi)
- Established: 28 November 1986
- Governing body: Taroko National Park Headquarters, National Park Service, Ministry of the Interior, Taiwan
- Website: www.taroko.gov.tw

Taroko National Park (Chinese: 太魯閣國家公園; pinyin: Tàilǔgé Gúojiā Gōngyuán; Pe̍h-ōe-jī: Thài-ló͘-koh Kok-ka Kong-hn̂g) is one of the nine national parks in Taiwan and was named after the Taroko Gorge, the landmark gorge of the park carved by the Liwu River. The park spans Taichung Municipality, Nantou County, and Hualien County and is located in Xiulin Township. The Taroko Gorge forms one of only three river-carved gorges in the world cut entirely through pure marble, ranking alongside Bhedaghat Gorge in Jabalpur, India and Trigrad Gorge in Bulgaria.

== History ==
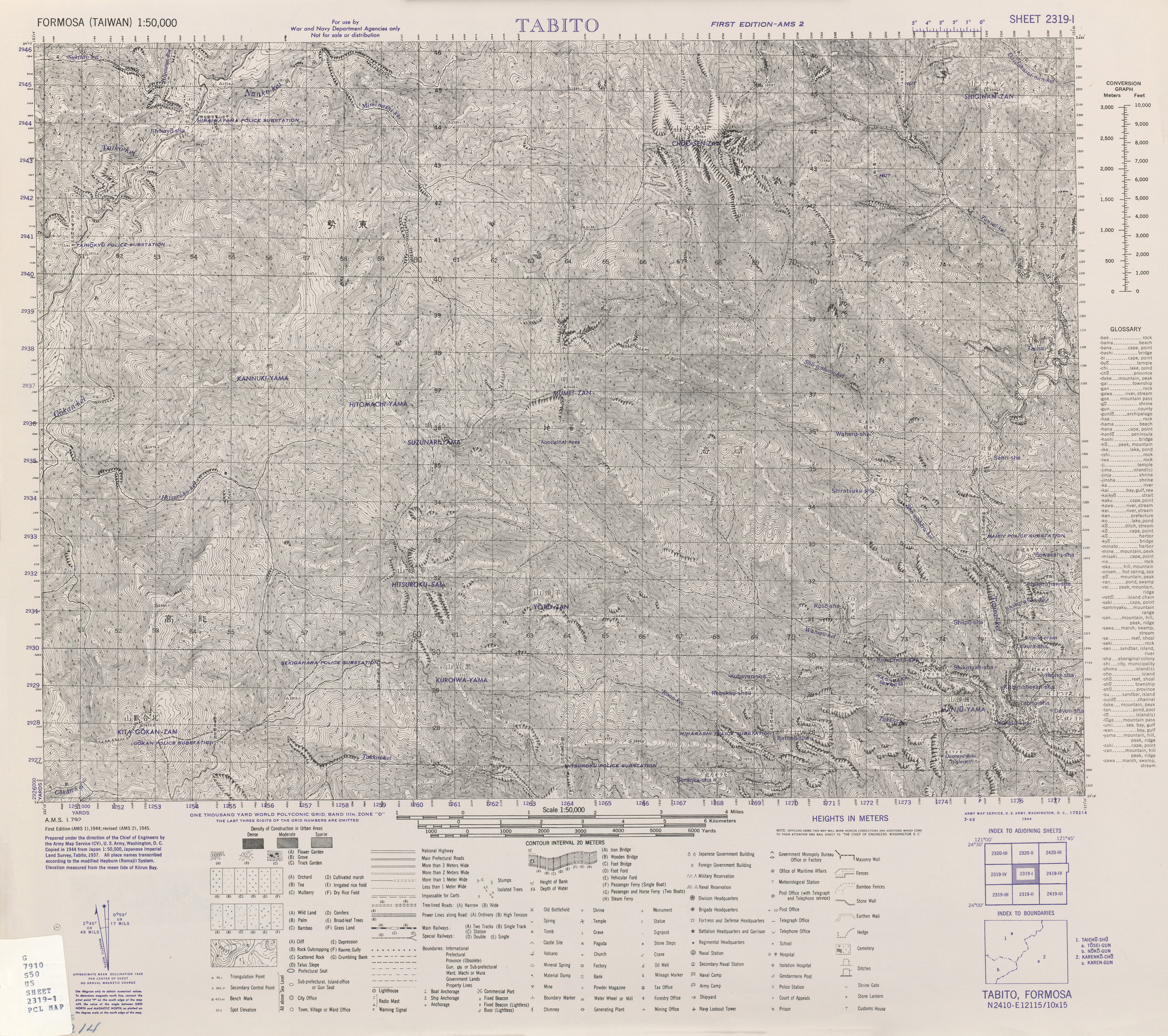
Map of Taroko area (1944)

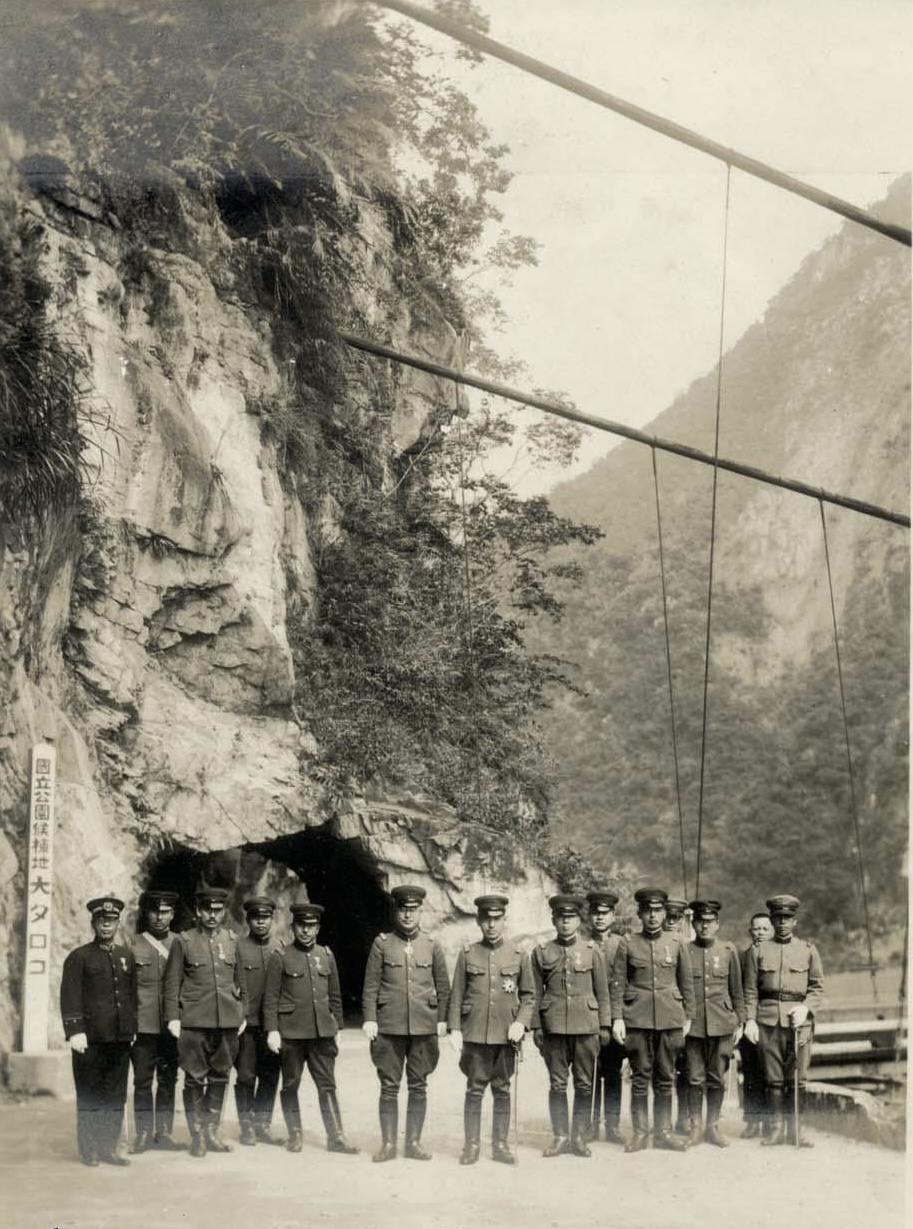
Photograph of Lieutenant General Shunroku Hata, Commander of the Taiwan Army at the entrance of Dai-Taroko (Tsugitaka-Taroko National Park) during an inspection tour of Hualien, alongside Officer Yamauchi, Colonel Matsumoto, Adjutant Kamata, Chief of Staff Ogisu, and others in September 1936.

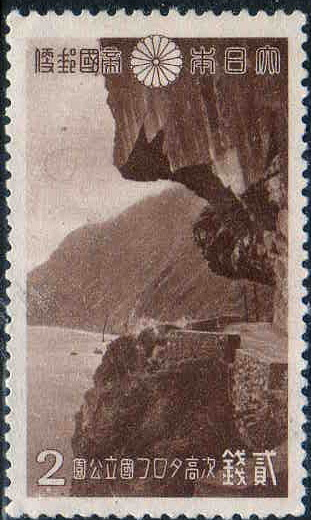
Postage stamp of Tsugitaka-Taroko National Park in 1941

This national park was originally established as the Tsugitaka-Taroko National Park (Japanese: 次高タロコ國立公園, Hepburn: Tsugitaka Taroko kokuritsu kōen) by the Governor-General of Taiwan on 12 December 1937 when Taiwan was part of the Empire of Japan. After the Empire of Japan's defeat in World War II, the Republic of China took over Taiwan in consequence. The ROC government subsequently abolished the park on 15 August 1945. It was not until 28 November 1986 that the park was reestablished. In 2002 it was named a potential World Heritage Site. Taroko National Park covers an area of 92,000 hectares (360 sq mi). It is located in Hualien County, Taichung City, and Nantou County, and is home to unique geological and natural resources, including twenty-seven peaks over 3,000 metres (9,800 ft) located in and around the Qilai and Nanhu Mountain ranges. It includes the marble gorge of Taroko, the Qingshui Cliff, the trail along the Shakadang River, Hehuanshan, Mount Qilai, and the waterfalls of the Baiyang trail.

The Central Cross-Island Highway (Provincial Highway 8) extends from Asian tropical deciduous forests to high mountain pine and cedar forests.

On 28 November 2021, Google commemorated the park on its homepage doodle to celebrate its 35th anniversary.

On April 3 2024, a magnitude 7 earthquake struck Taiwan's eastern coast, resulting in widespread devastation and significant loss of life. Landslides obstructed Provincial Highway No. 8 at Taroko Gorge, trapping hundreds of individuals. The landscape of Taroko Gorge, was scarred by the aftermath of the earthquake mainly due to the landslides that occurred. As of 2026, many of the park's main attractions and trails remain closed for construction, with entry times limited to five periods throughout the day via the Provincial Highway No. 9.

== Origin of the name ==
The name "Taroko" (太魯閣) derives from the Truku tribe, an indigenous group formally recognized by the Taiwanese government as of 2004. The Truku tribe originally resided in the upper region of the Zhuoshui River (濁水溪) before migrating eastward towards Hualien County through Mount Qilai (called Klbiyun in the Truku language) to the Liwu River. The Truku tribe continues to reside in Hualien County, including within the designated National Park area.

== Geology ==
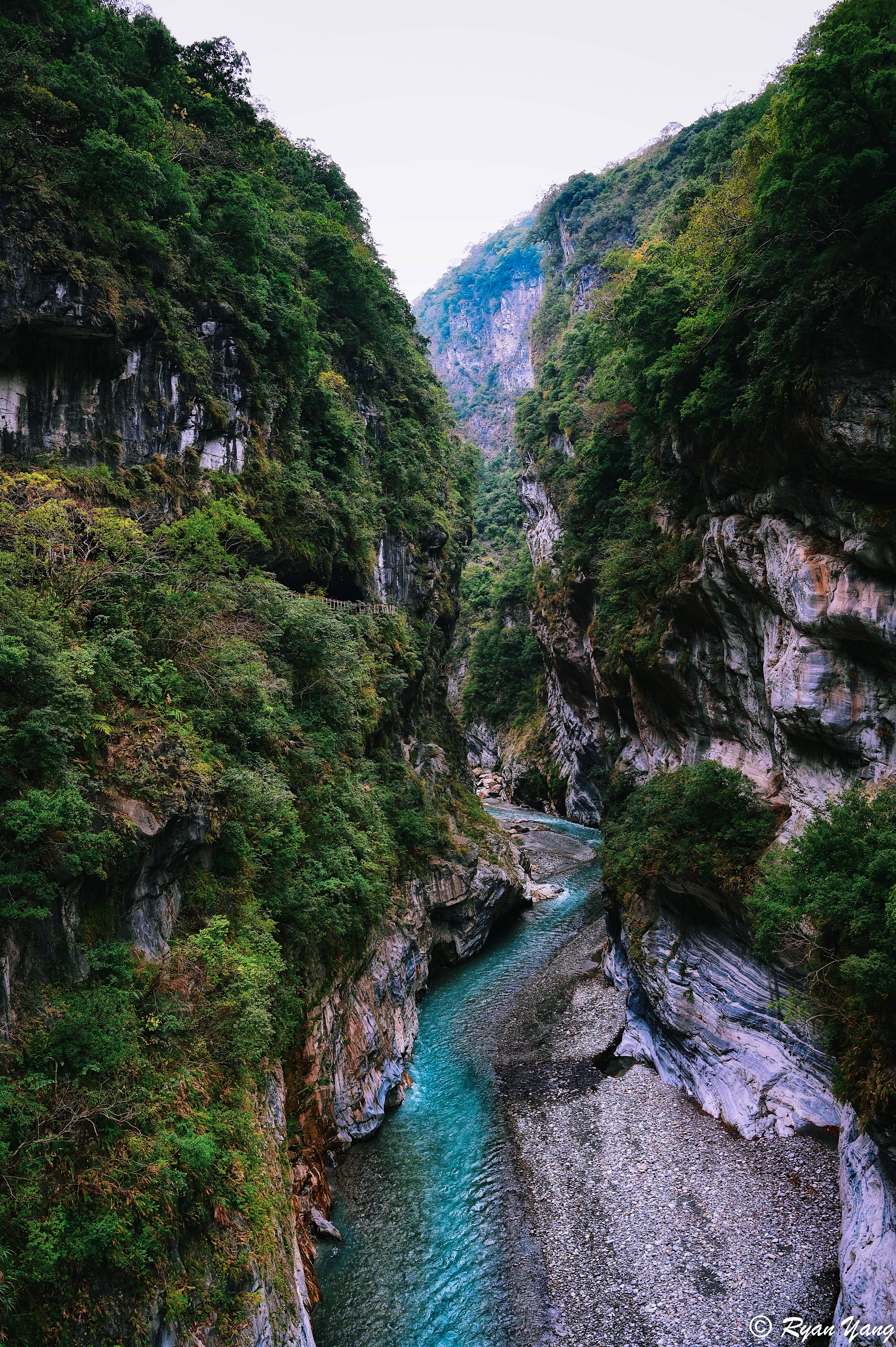
Taroko Gorge and Liwu River

Taiwan was created through the collision of the Philippine and the Eurasian plates in what is known as the Penglai Orogeny. This movement occurred some four million years ago and is responsible for the formation of the Central Mountain Range that runs north-south through much of Taiwan. Even today the shift in tectonic plates continues and this area continues to rise a few millimeters every year.

Marble formations only revealed themselves after millions of years of erosion and continued uplifting. Calcium Carbonate remains accumulated some 230 million years ago. These deposits through time, pressure, and the elements were gradually lithified into the limestone that in turn metamorphosed into marble. As Taiwan was uplifted from the pressures of the colliding plates, the erosive forces of weathering and water worked to carve out the gorges we see today. Due to the reflection of the light of the calcium carbonate, the water of the Liwu River achieves a bright turquoise color.

Erosion by the river against the constantly elevating land combined with the heavy sub-tropical rains resulted in a rapid transformation of the landscape. Marble, which is relatively hard and resistant to erosion, nevertheless relented to these forces resulting in the unusually steep and narrow canyons.

The gorge itself was carved into the marble by the erosive power of the Liwu River.

The landscape of Taroko remains highly dynamic due to ongoing tectonic plate convergence and heavy annual rainfall, conditions that contribute to frequent earthquakes and landslides within the gorge. These hazards were notably demonstrated during the April 2024 Hualien earthquake which caused major rockfalls and significant alterations to the canyon's terrain. In response, park authorities prioritized geological stabilization and conducted structural reinforcement efforts along the gorge's marble cliffs to reduce further rosk of rockfalls affecting Provincial Highway 8.

Sights include:

- Tunnel of Nine Turns (九曲洞 Jiuqudong) (Opened in November 2017)
- Eternal Spring Shrine
- Yenzikou, Swallow Grotto Trail (燕子口)
- Jinheng Park (靳珩公園)
- Cimu Bridge, Motherly Devotion Bridge (慈母橋)
- Tianxiang
- Zhuilu Cliff (錐麓斷崖)
- Liufang Bridge (流芳橋)
- Dayuling (大禹嶺)
- Buluowan (布洛灣)
- Qingshui Cliffs (清水斷崖)
- Shakadang Trail
- Changuang Temple (禪光寺)
- Baiyang Trail (白楊步道)

== Trails ==
Taroko National Park encompasses mountains such as Hehuanshan and Mount Qilai. The park classifies trails into Grades 0 to 5 based on difficulty.

Grade 0

- Taroko Terrace Trail

Grade 1

- Huide Trail
- Shakadang Trail
- Swallow Grotto (Yanzikou) Trail
- Jiuqudong (Tunnel of Nine Turns) Trail
- Baiyang Trail
- Buluowan Scenic Trails
- Lushui Trail
- Chongde Trail

Grade 2

- Xiaozhuilu Trail
- Huoran Pavilion Trail
- Changchun Shrine Trail

Grade 3

- Dali-Datong Trail
- Zhuilu Old Road
- Hehuanshan Main Peak Trail
- Xiaoqilai Trail
- Mt. Yangtou
- Lushui-Wenshan Trail
- Hehuanshan East Peak
- Hehuanshan North Peak
- Mt. Shimen Trail

Grade 4

- Mt. Qingshui
- Mt. Nanhu (North Section 1)
- Mt. Bilu
- Mt. Bilu - Mt. Yangtou Traverse
- Mt. Pingfeng
- Hehuanshan West Peak

Grade 5

- Qilai East Ridge
- Mt. Qilai
- North Section 2

== Transportation ==
Taroko National Park is typically accessed from Hualien City where various tours, buses, and transport options are available next to the Hualien Train station. The closest train station to the park is Xincheng Station of Taiwan Railway, roughly 7 kilometres (4.3 mi) from the park's main headquarters. Due to Xincheng's distance from the park itself, visitors looking to get closer to the park will typically utilize the many tour buses and taxis available.

== Gallery ==
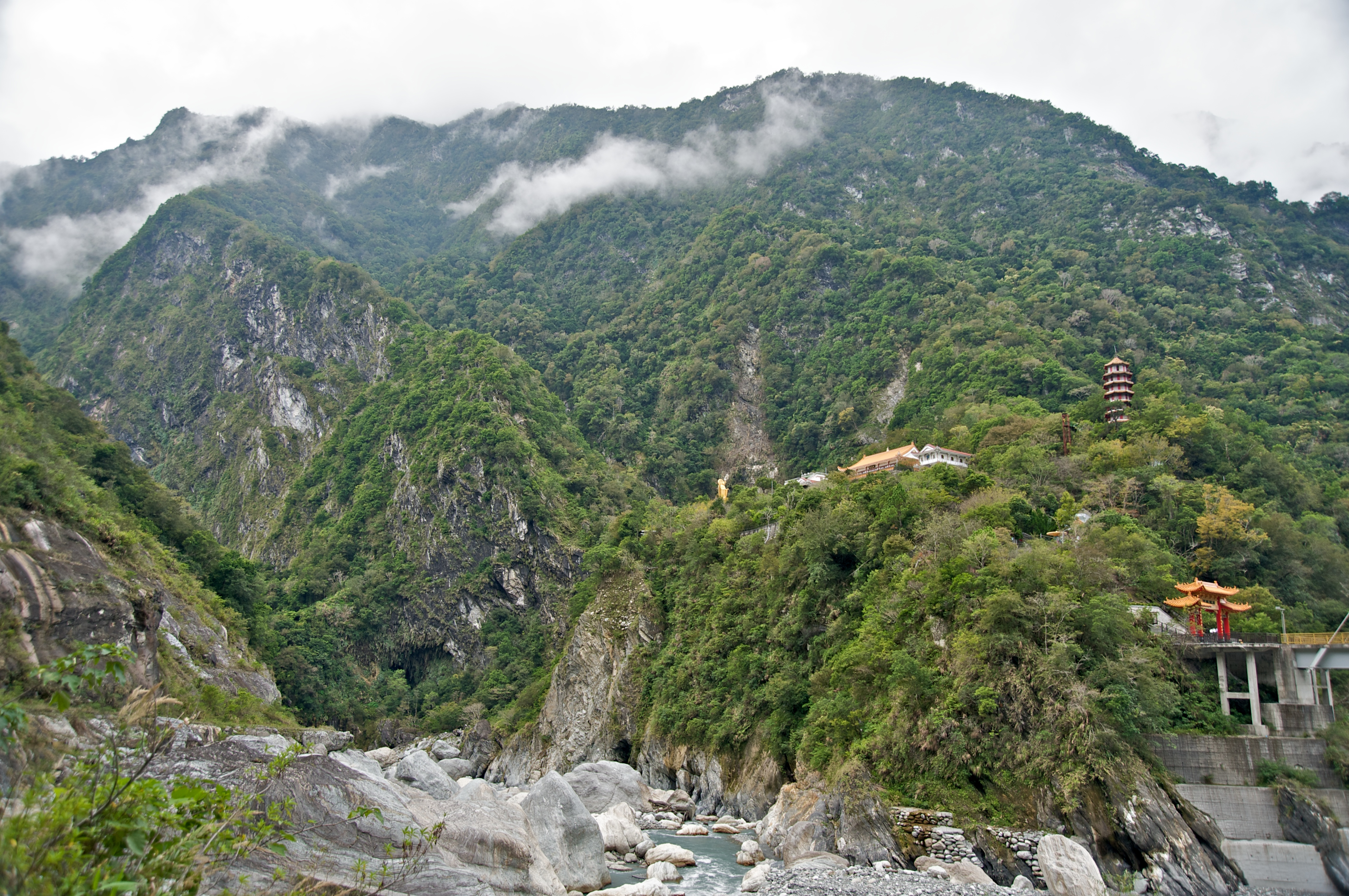
Xiangde Temple at Tianxiang

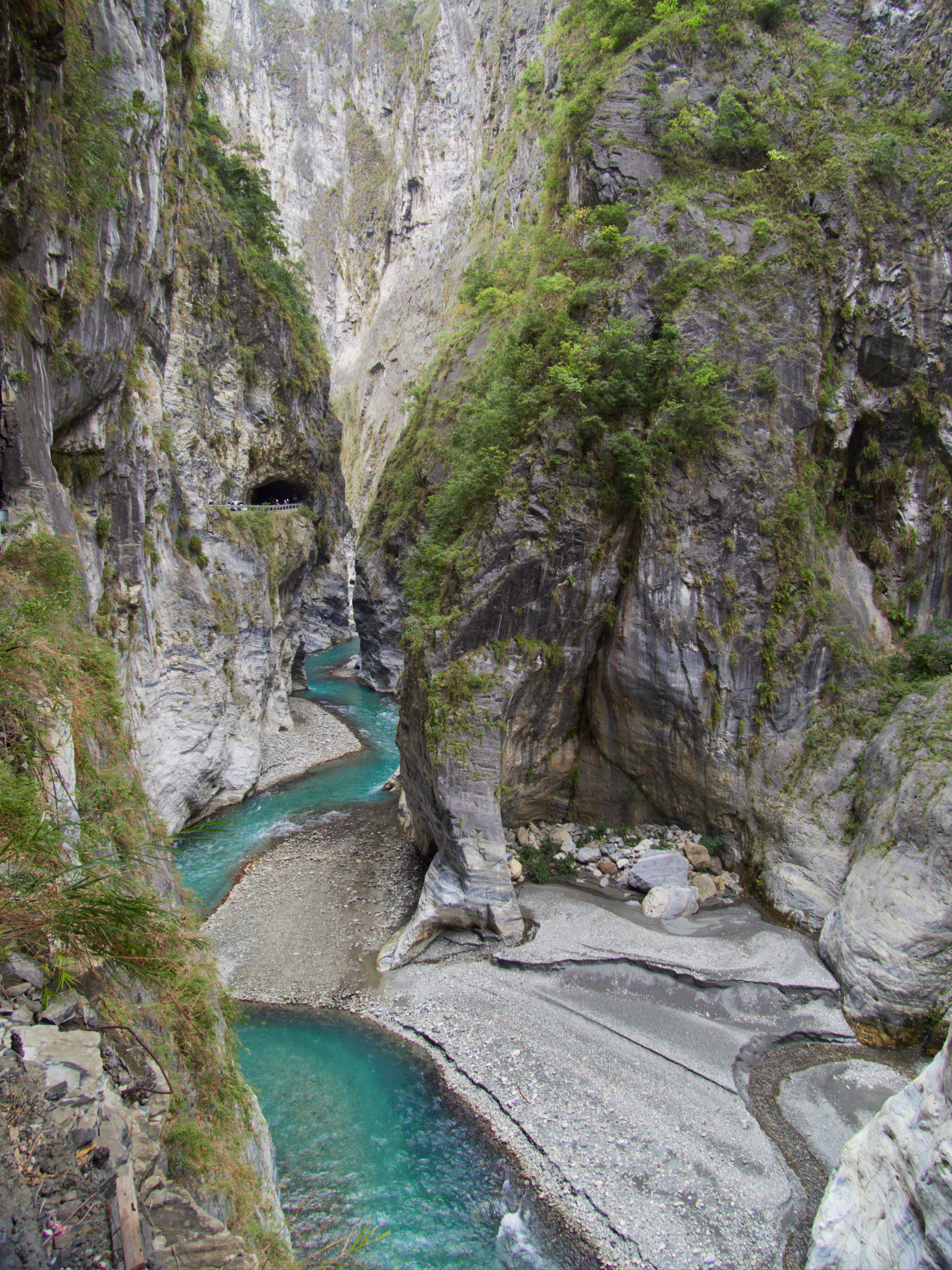
Taroko Gorge, March 2024, a week before the earthquake

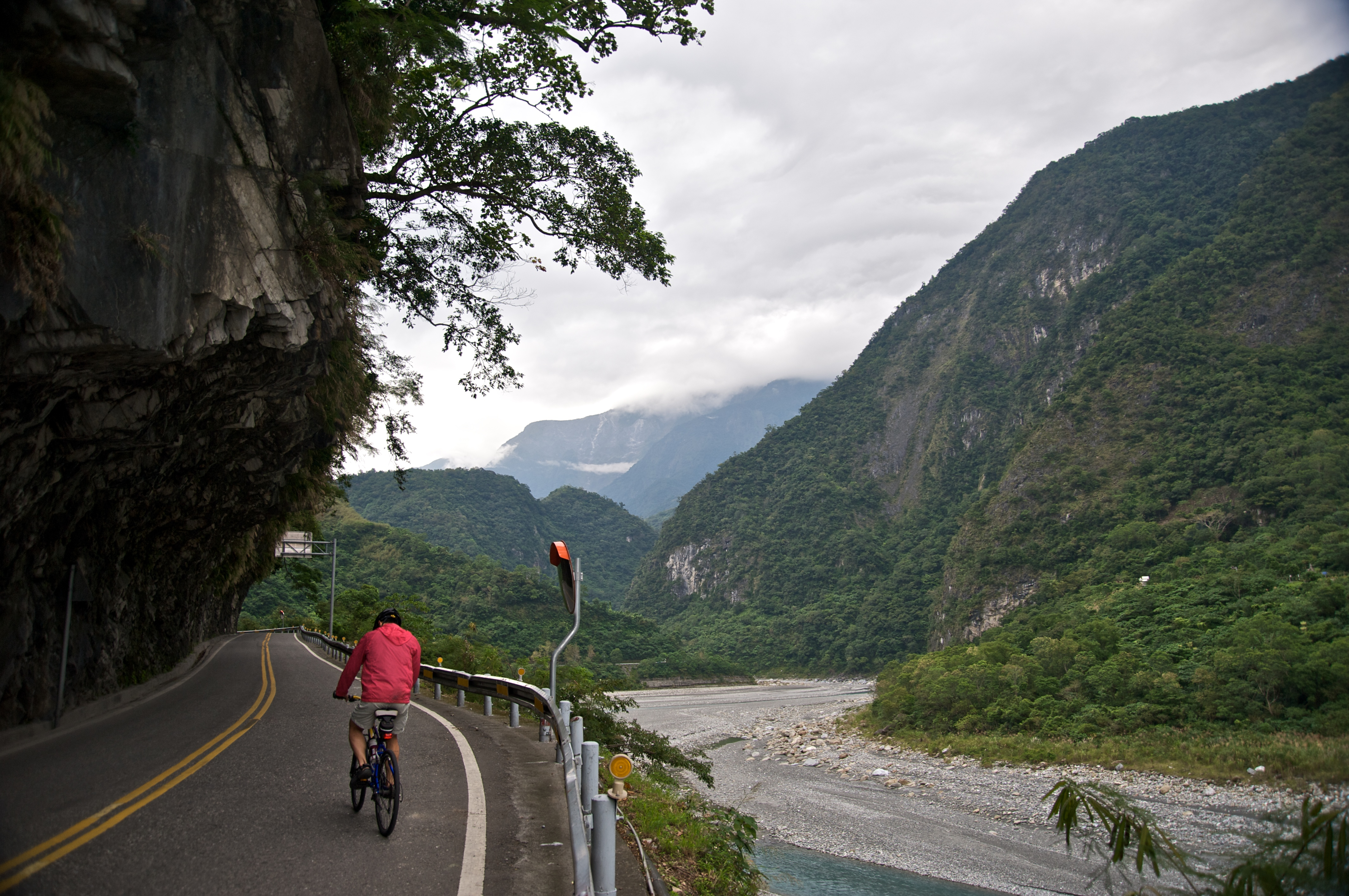
Bicycling uphill

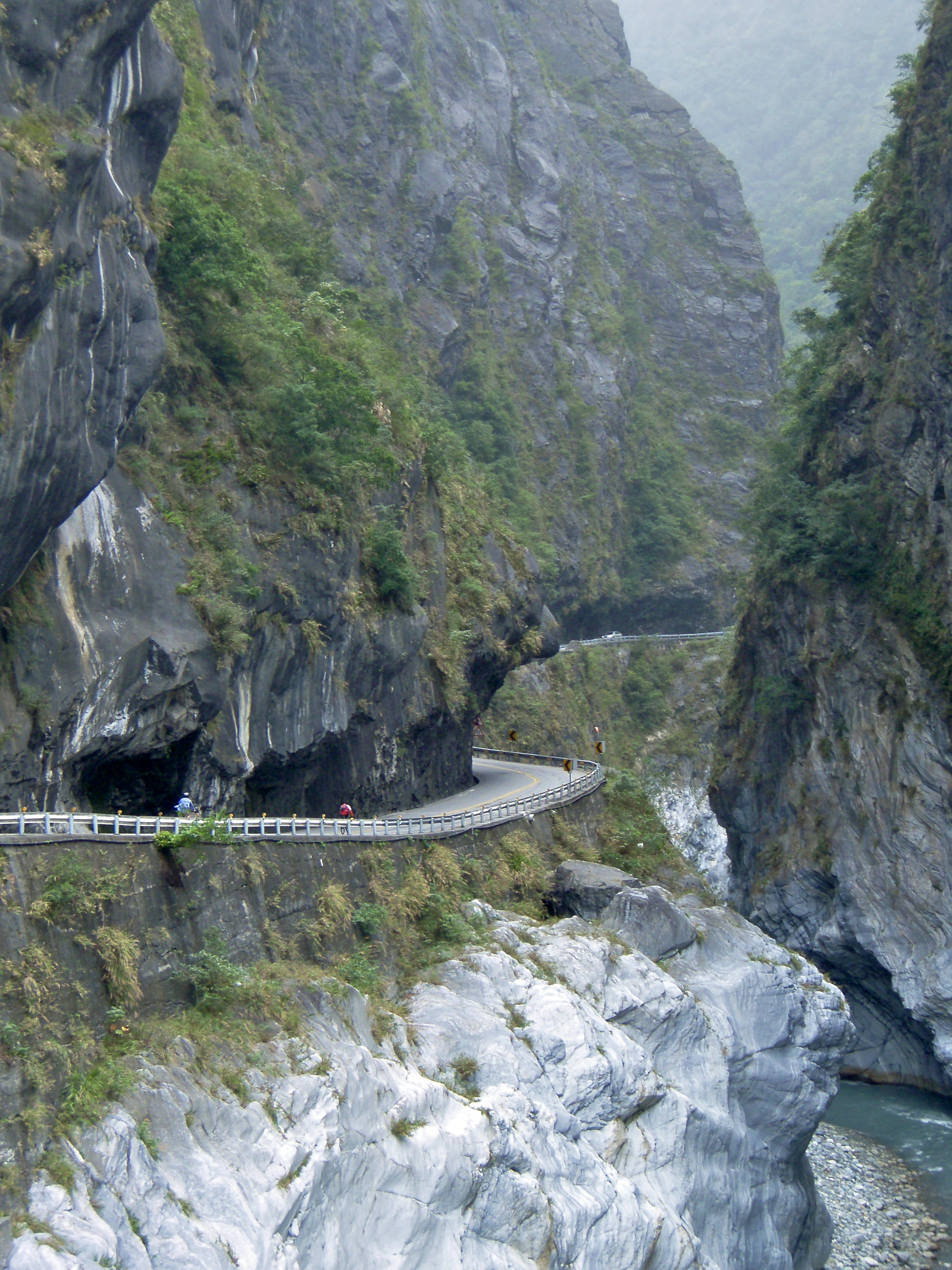
Bicyclists share narrow roads with motor vehicles

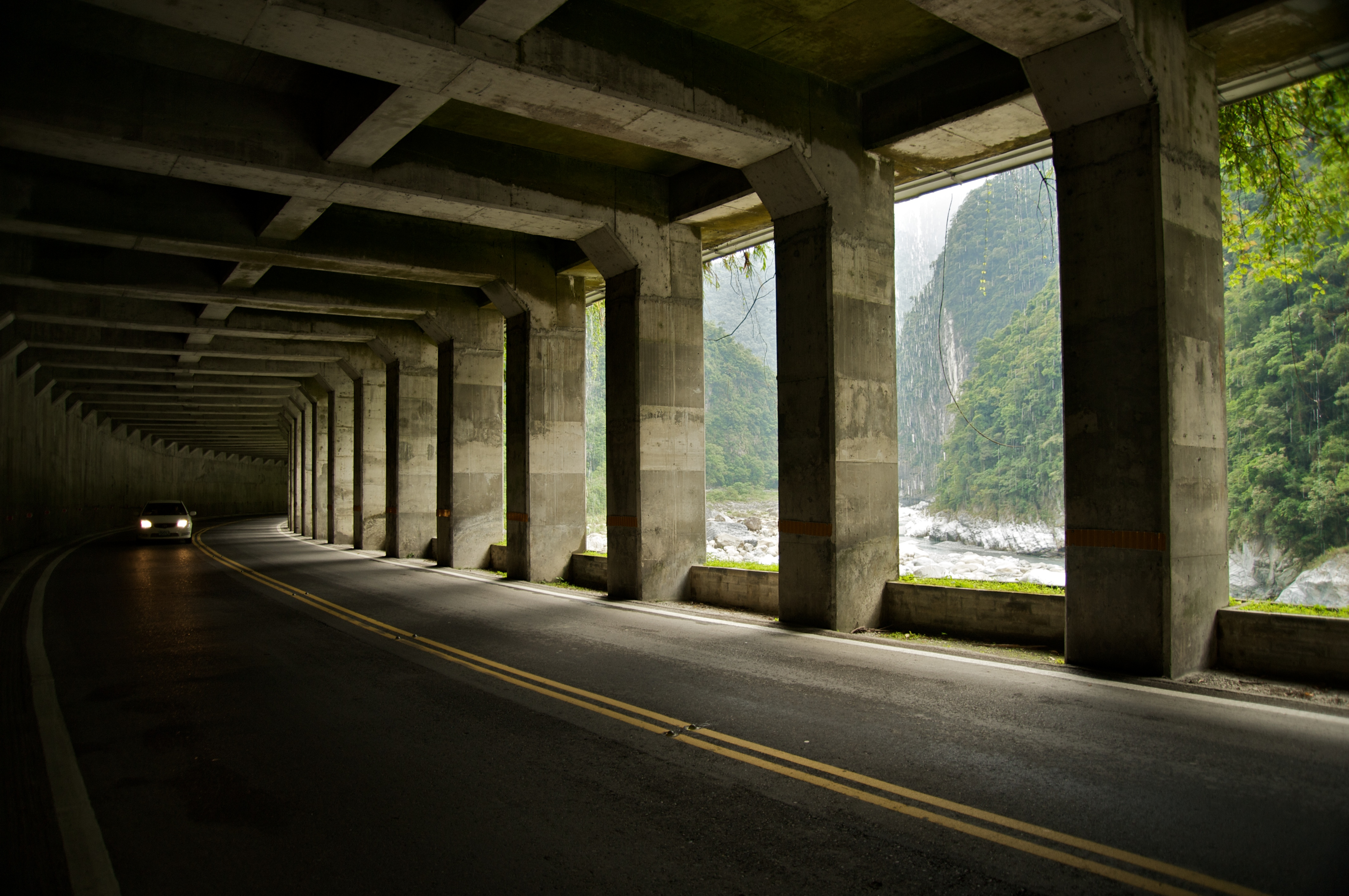
Rockfall Prevention Tunnel(明隧道)

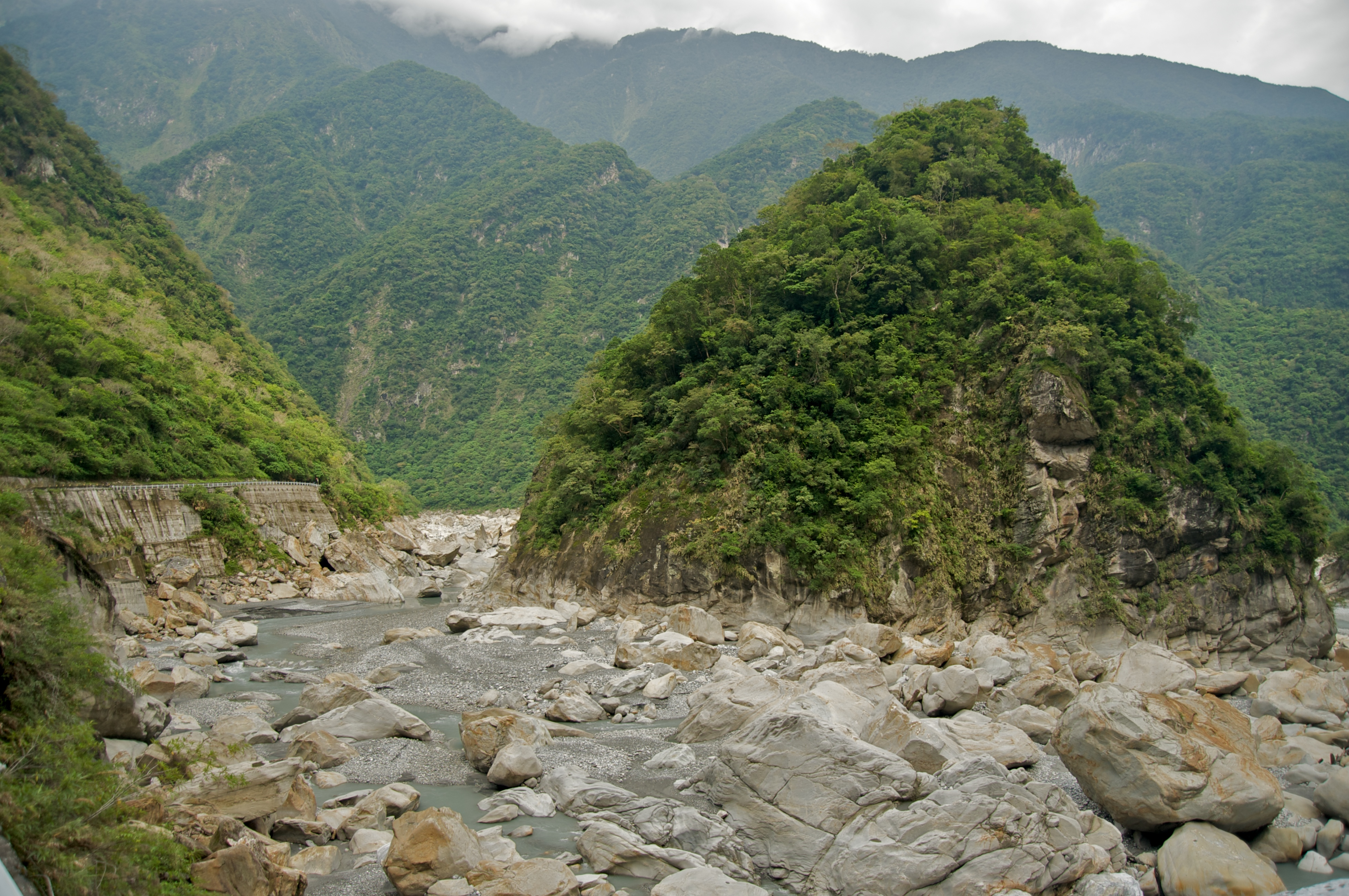
Gorge views

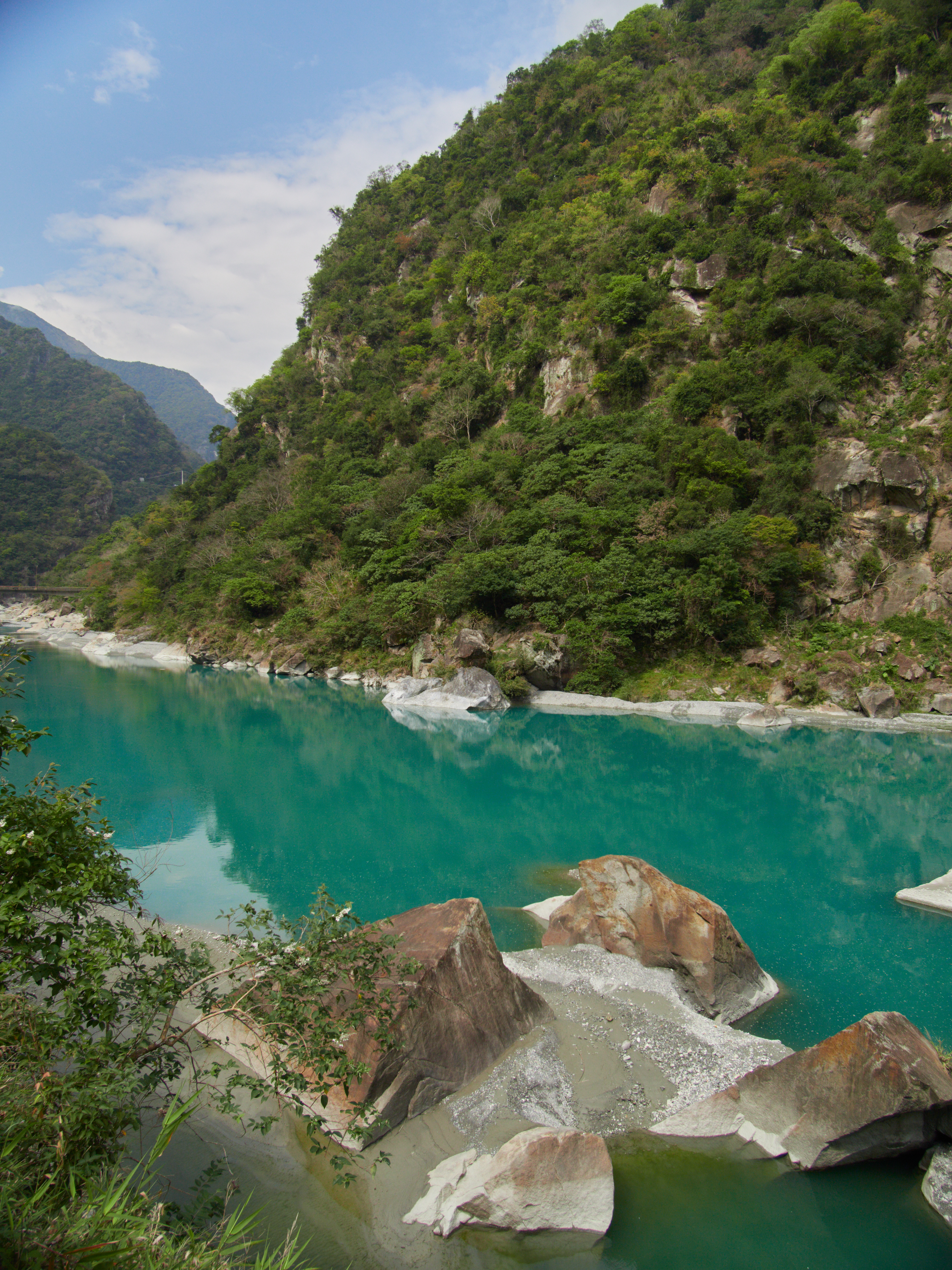
Taroko Gorge, downstream

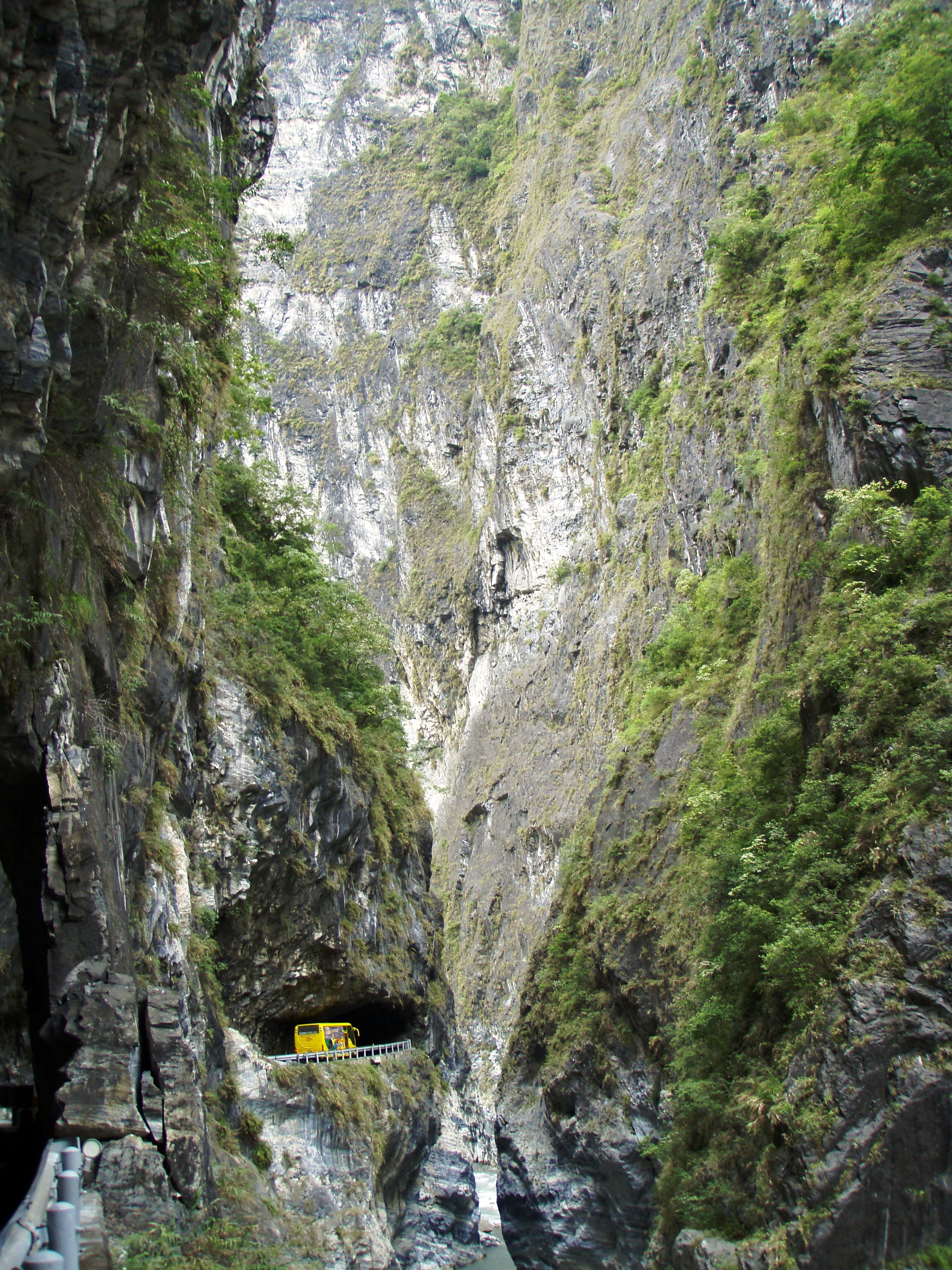
Taroko Gorge at Swallow Grotto Trail

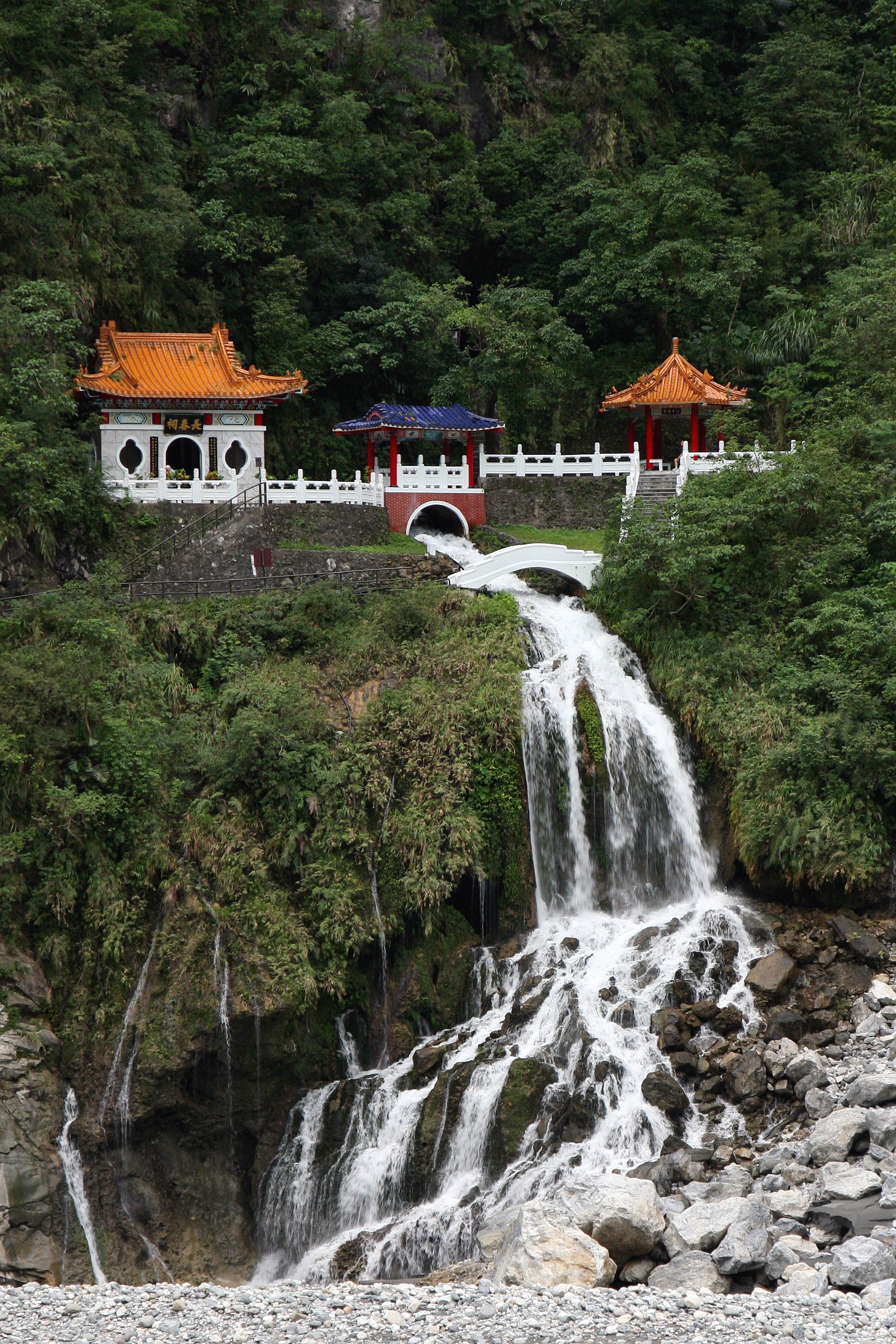
Eternal Spring Shrine, Taroko National Park, Hualien on the east coast.

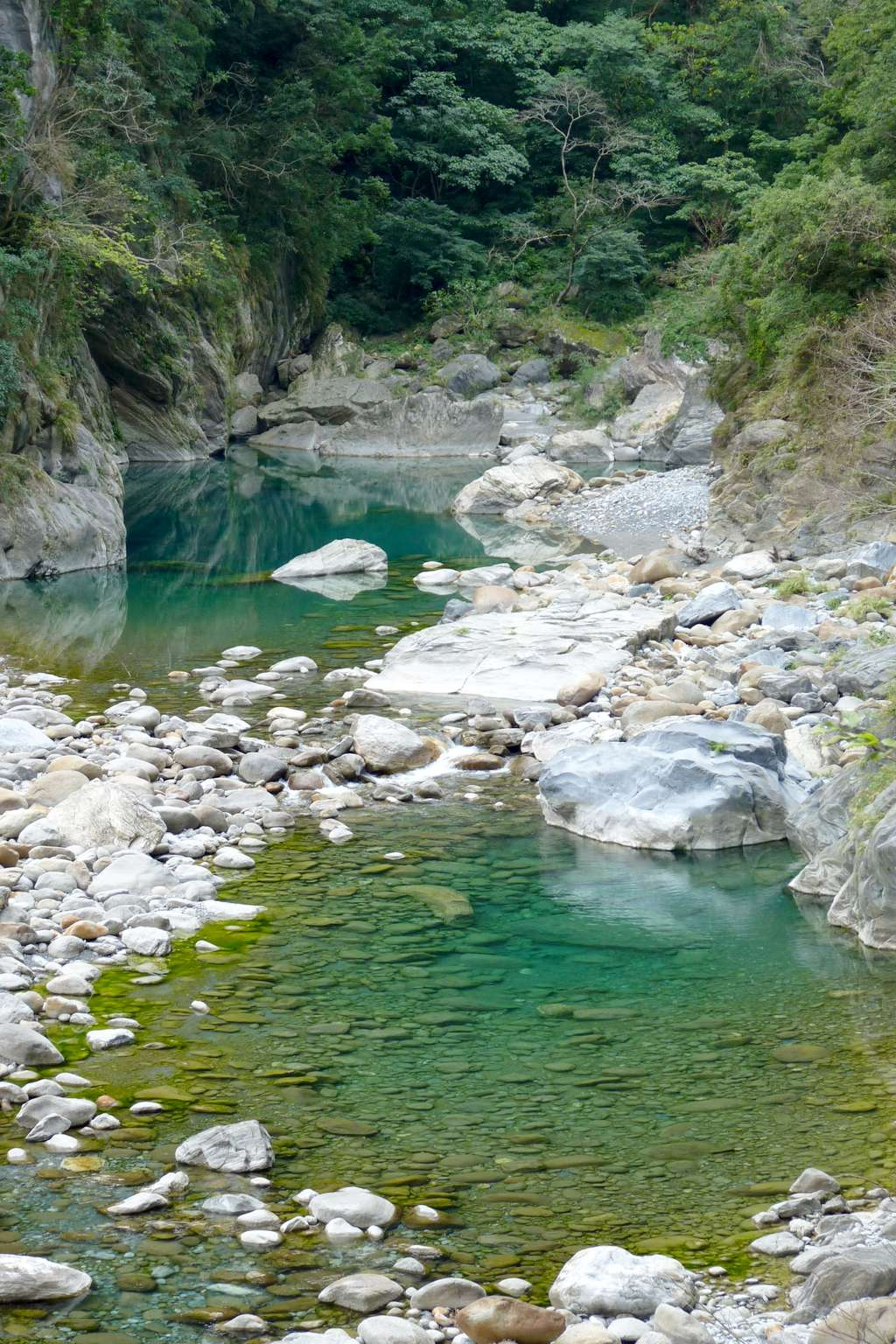
Shakadang River

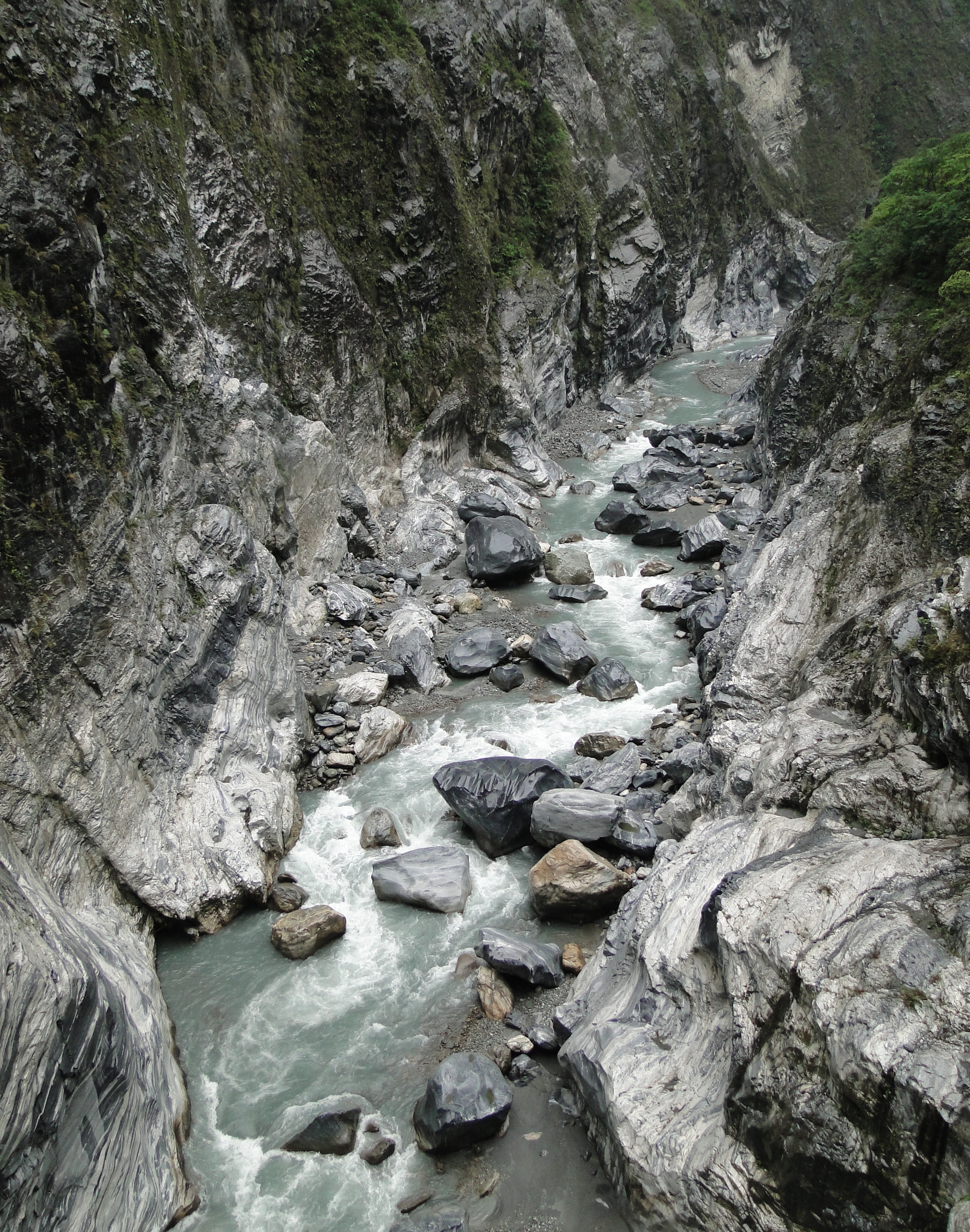
Liwu River

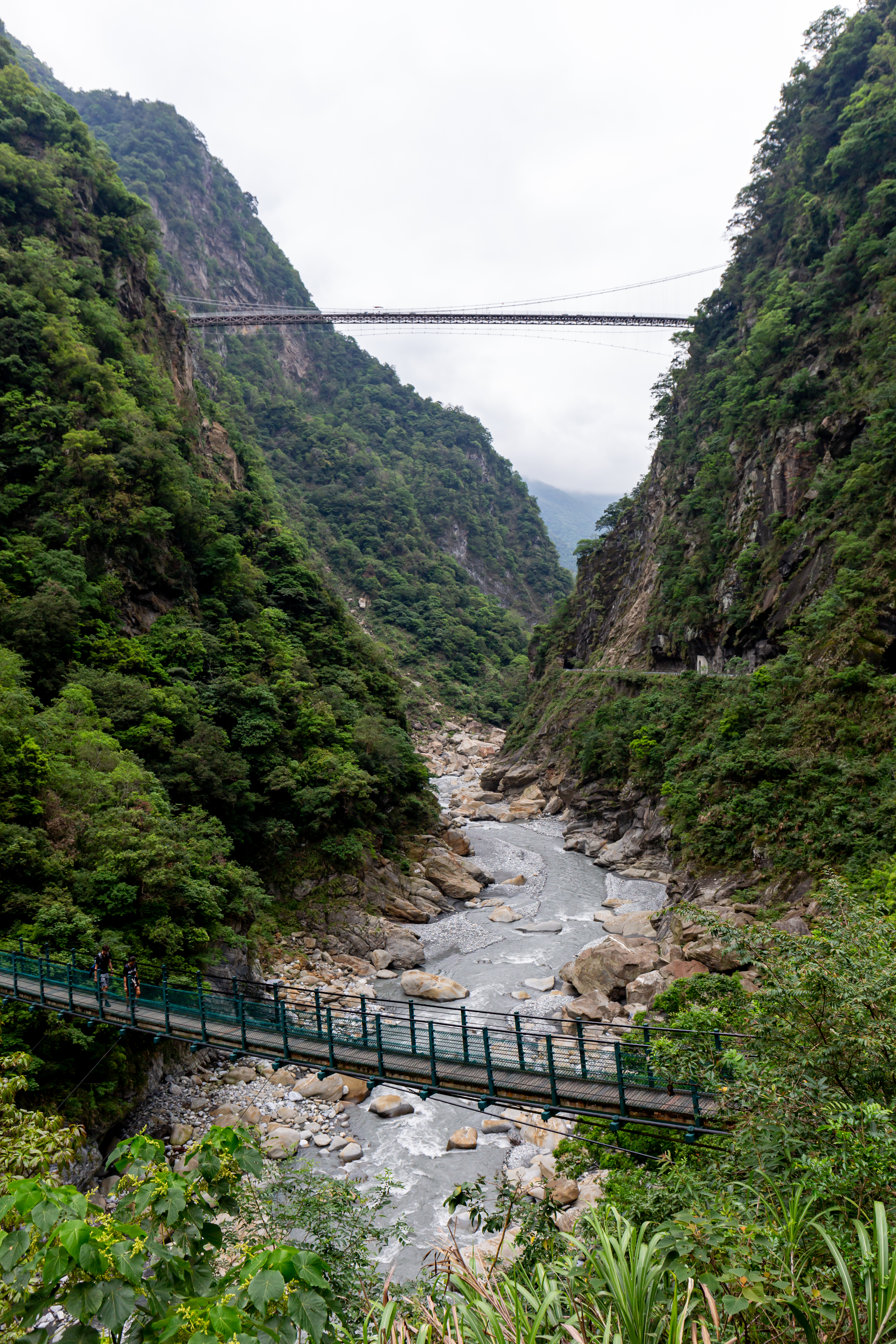
Zhuilu Suspension Bridge with road bridge behind it

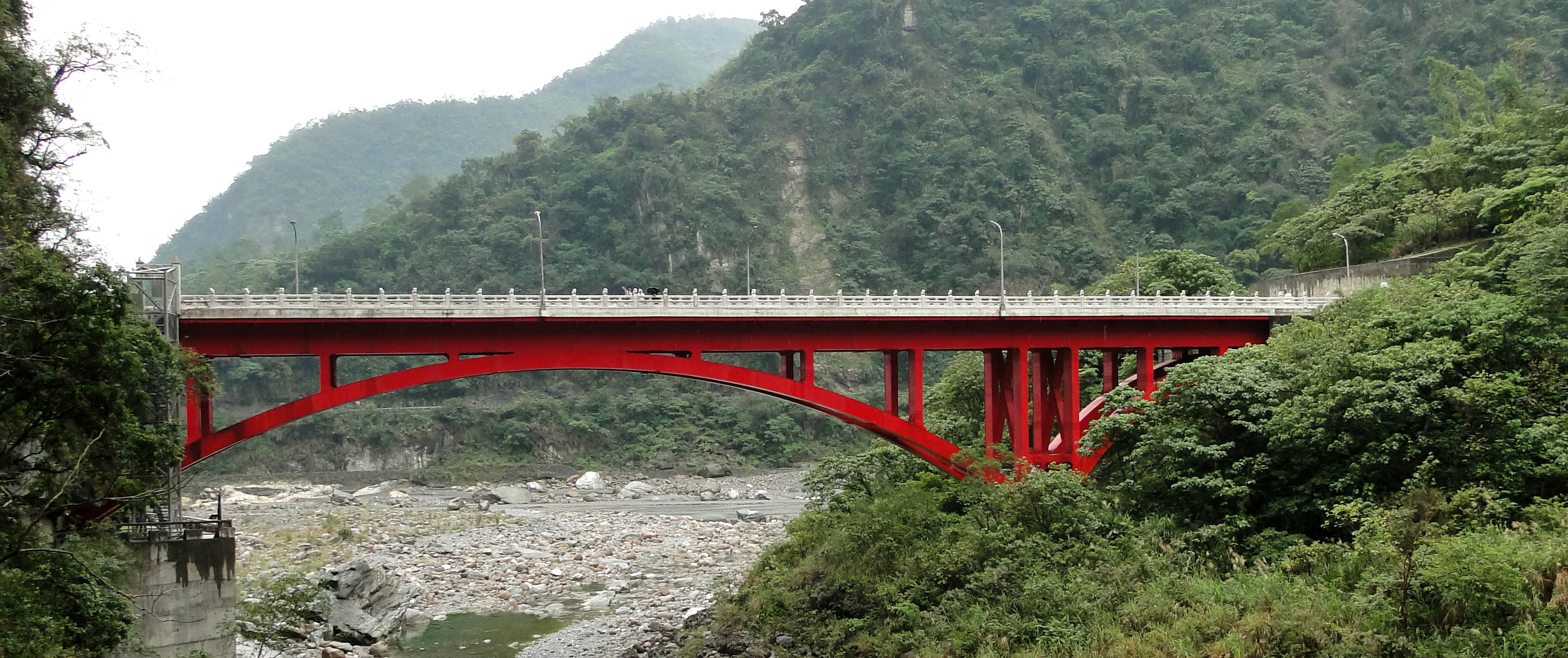
(Shakadang) Bridge of 100 Lions

Taroko National Park as seen from a moped, 2011

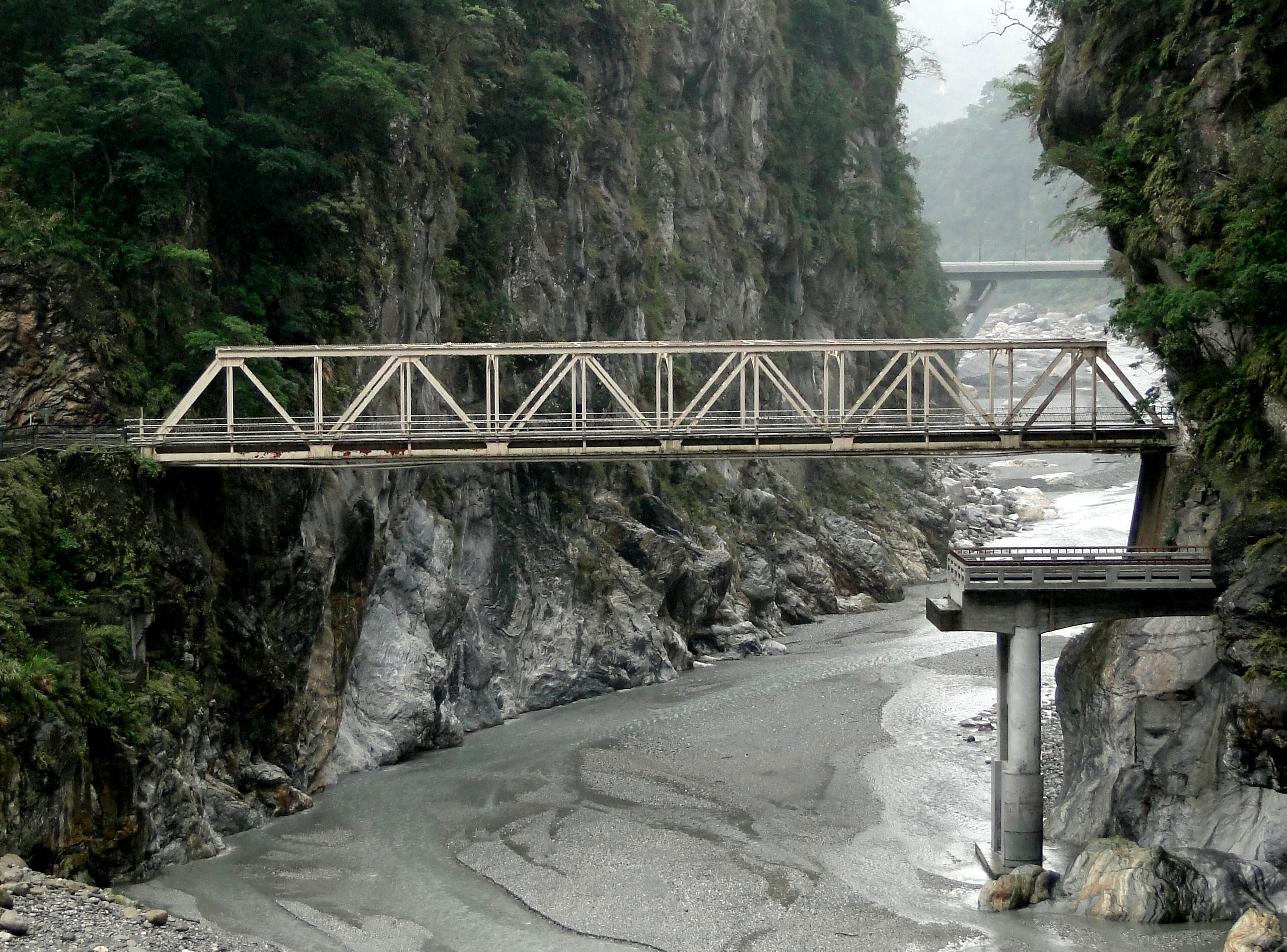
Changchun Bridge

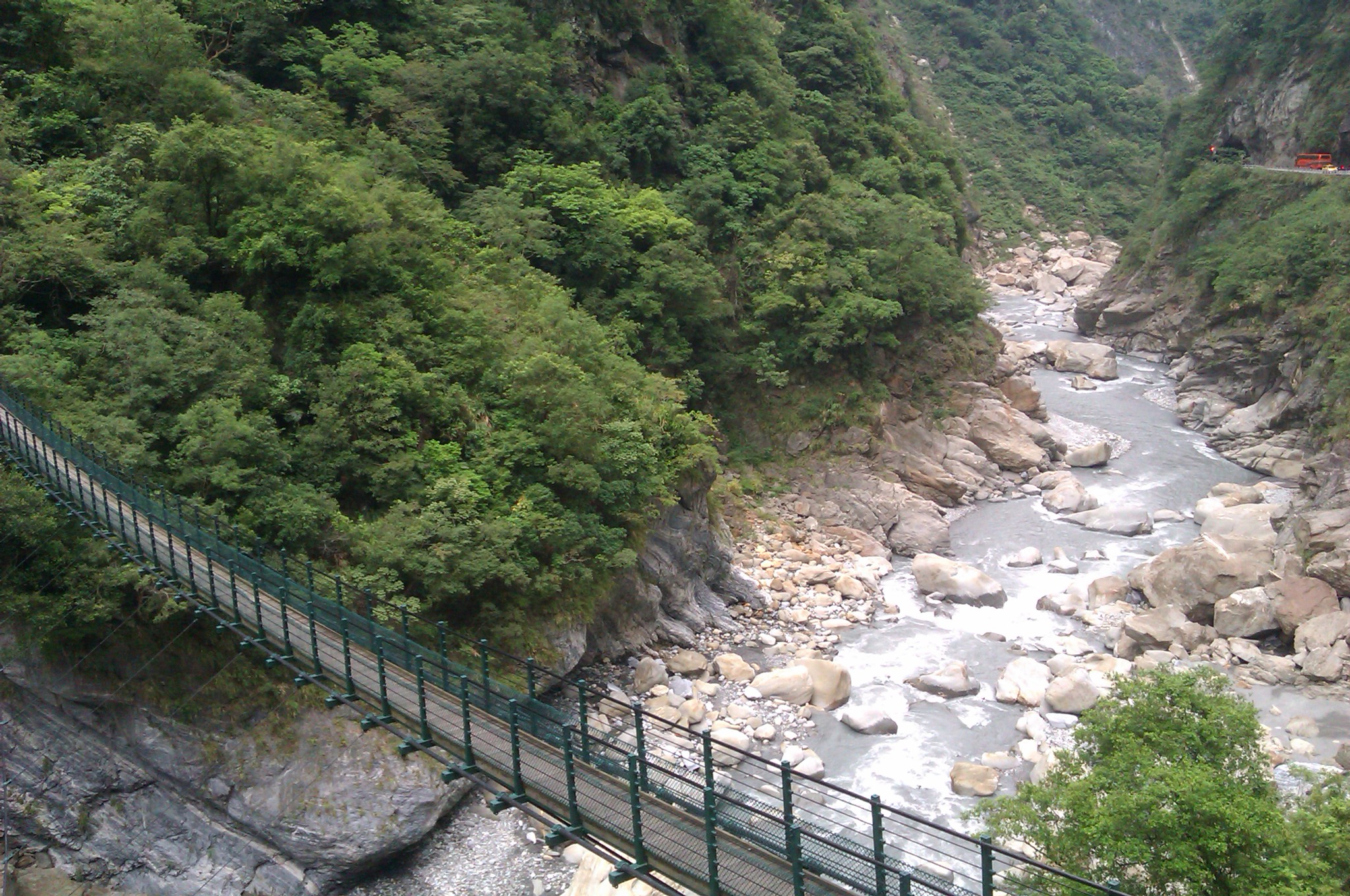
Zhuilu Suspension Bridge(East of Zhuilu Old Road)

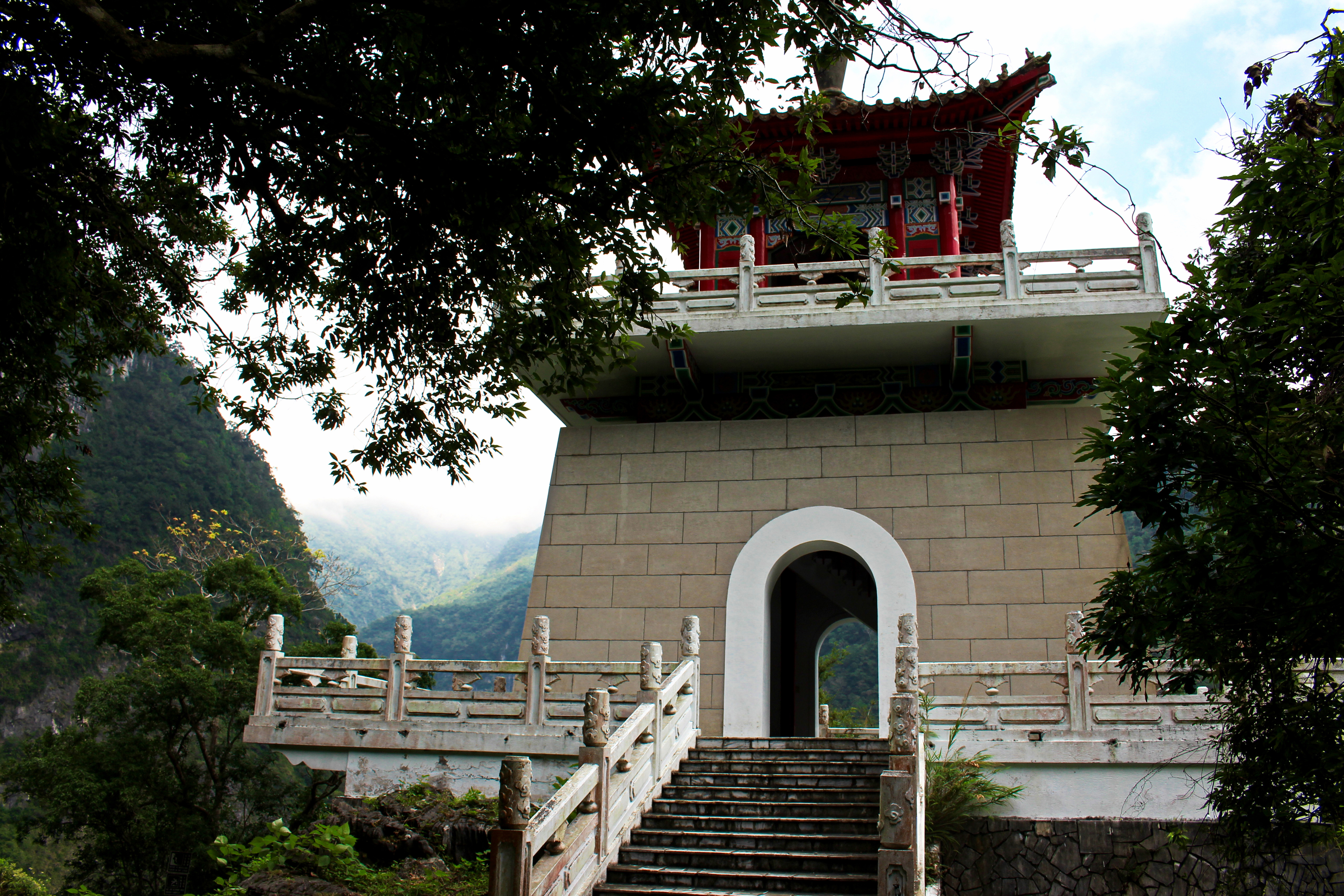
Bell Tower at Eternal Spring Shrine Trail

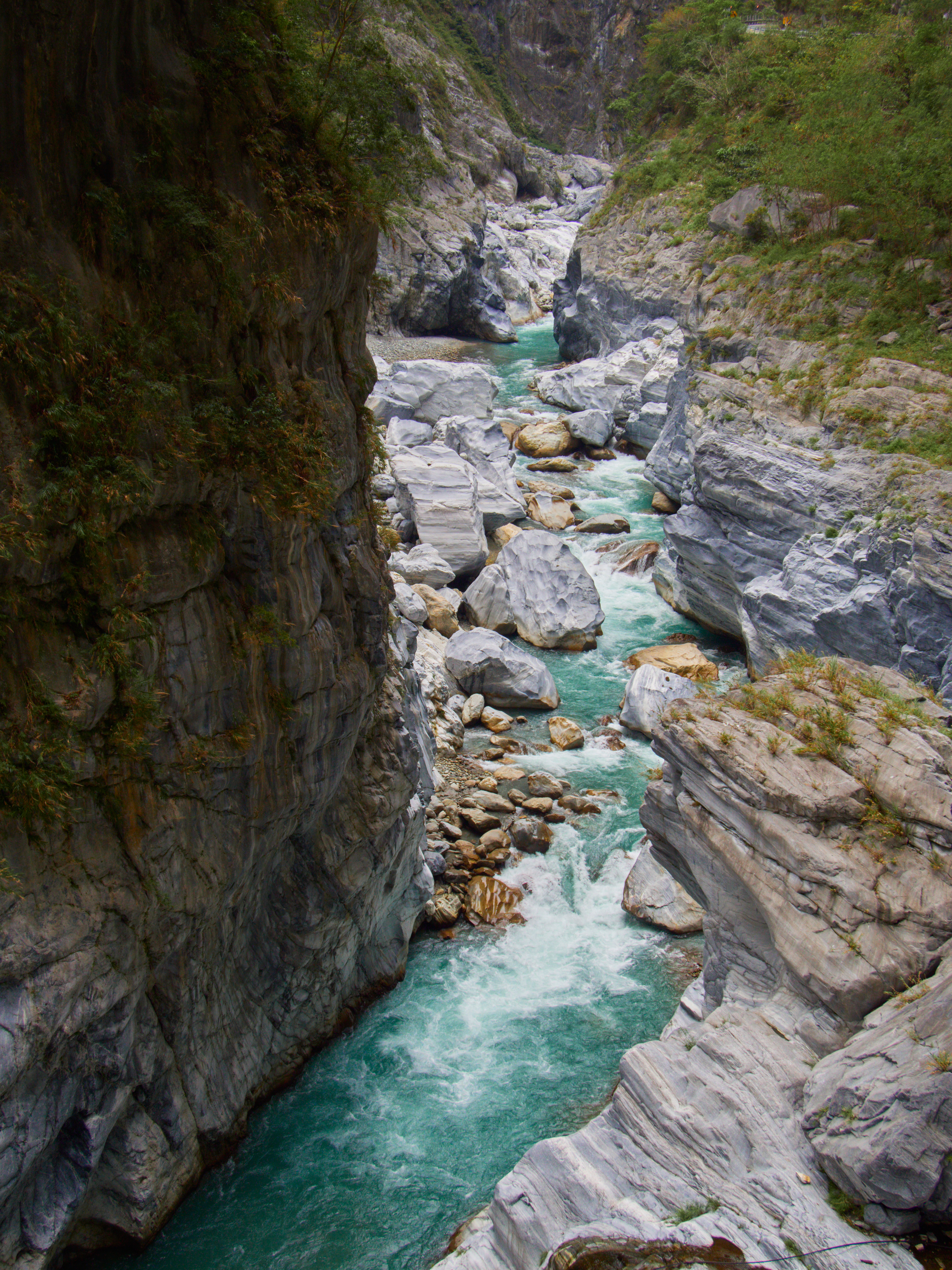
Taroko Gorge, March 2024

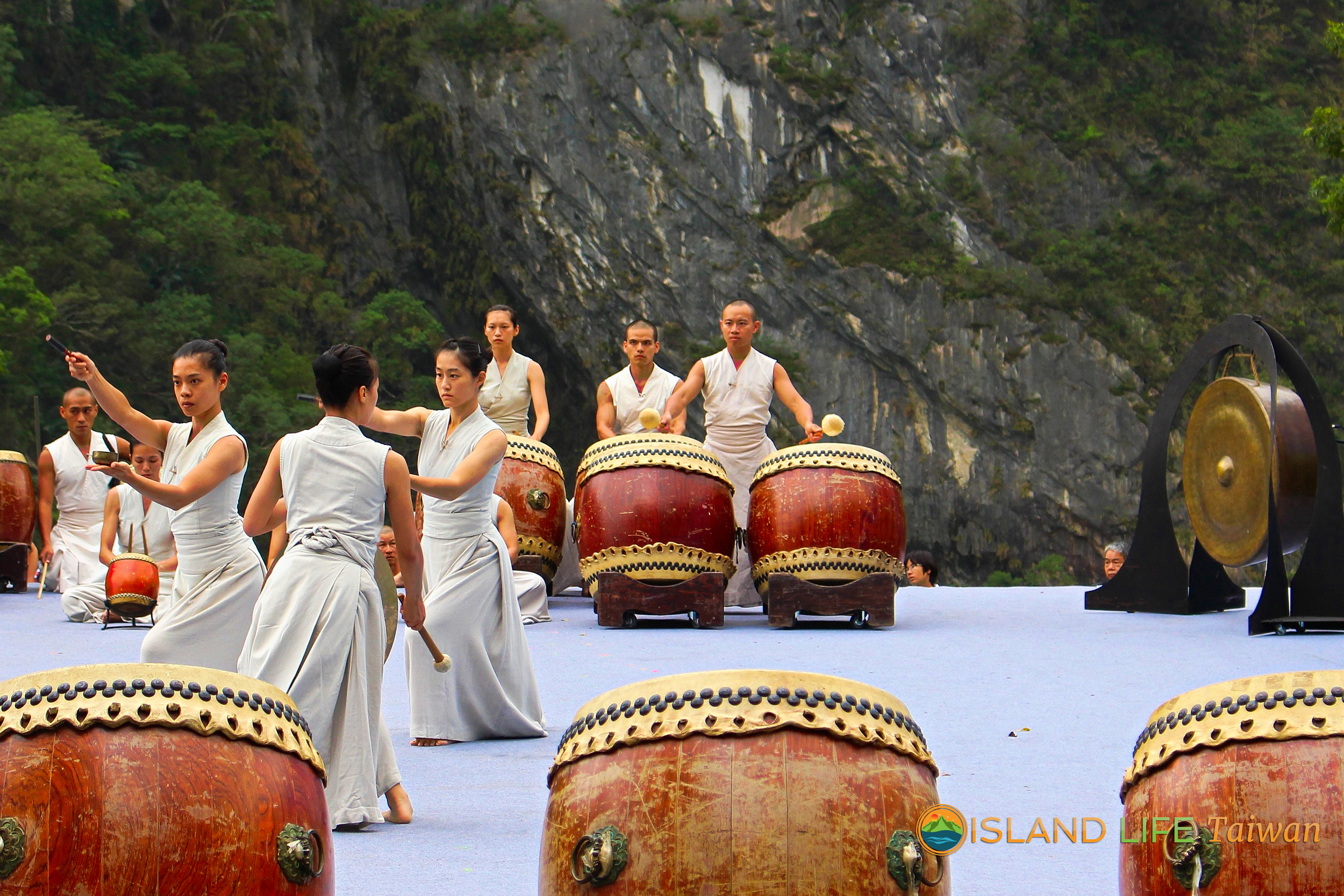
Taroko Music Festival

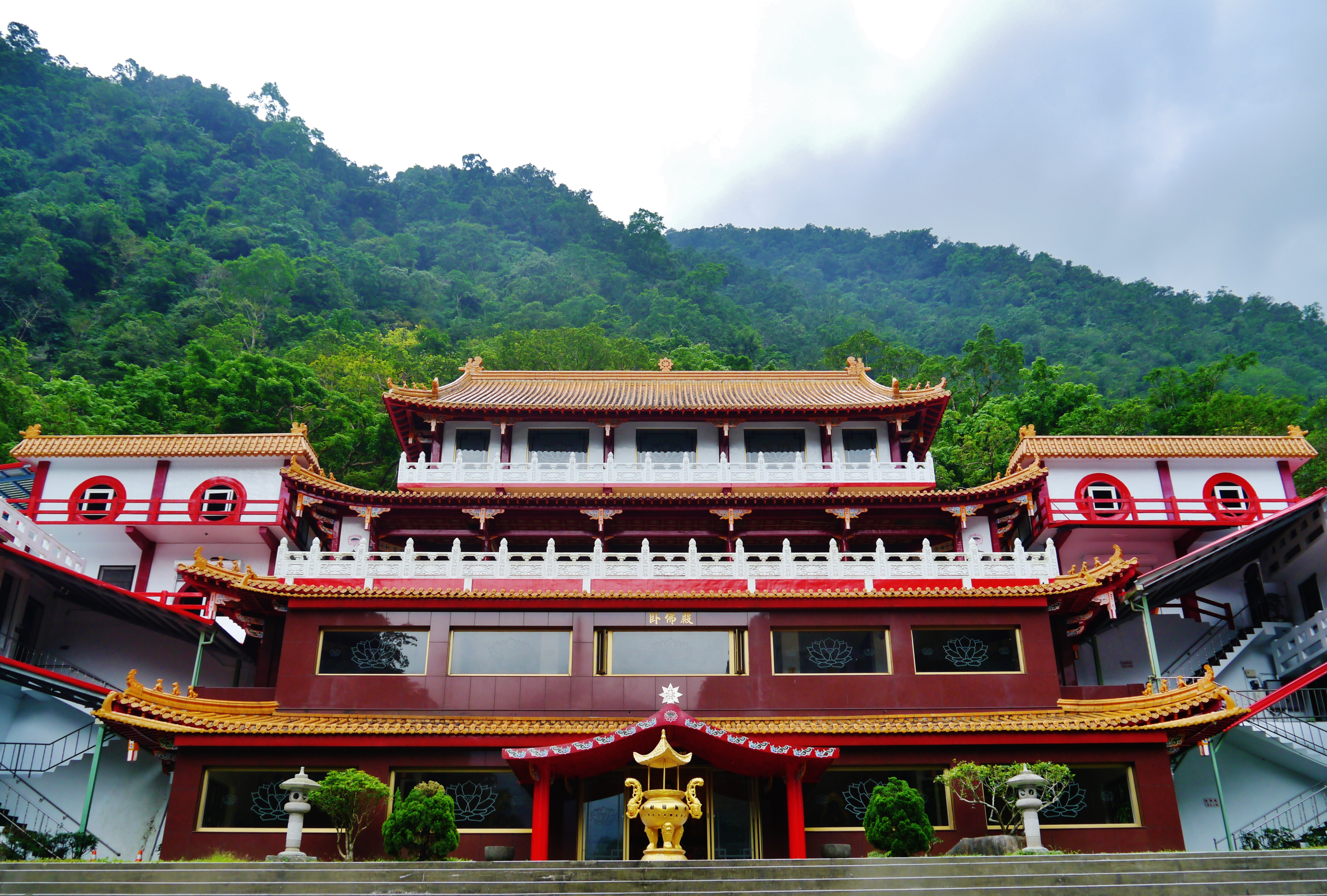
Changuang Temple

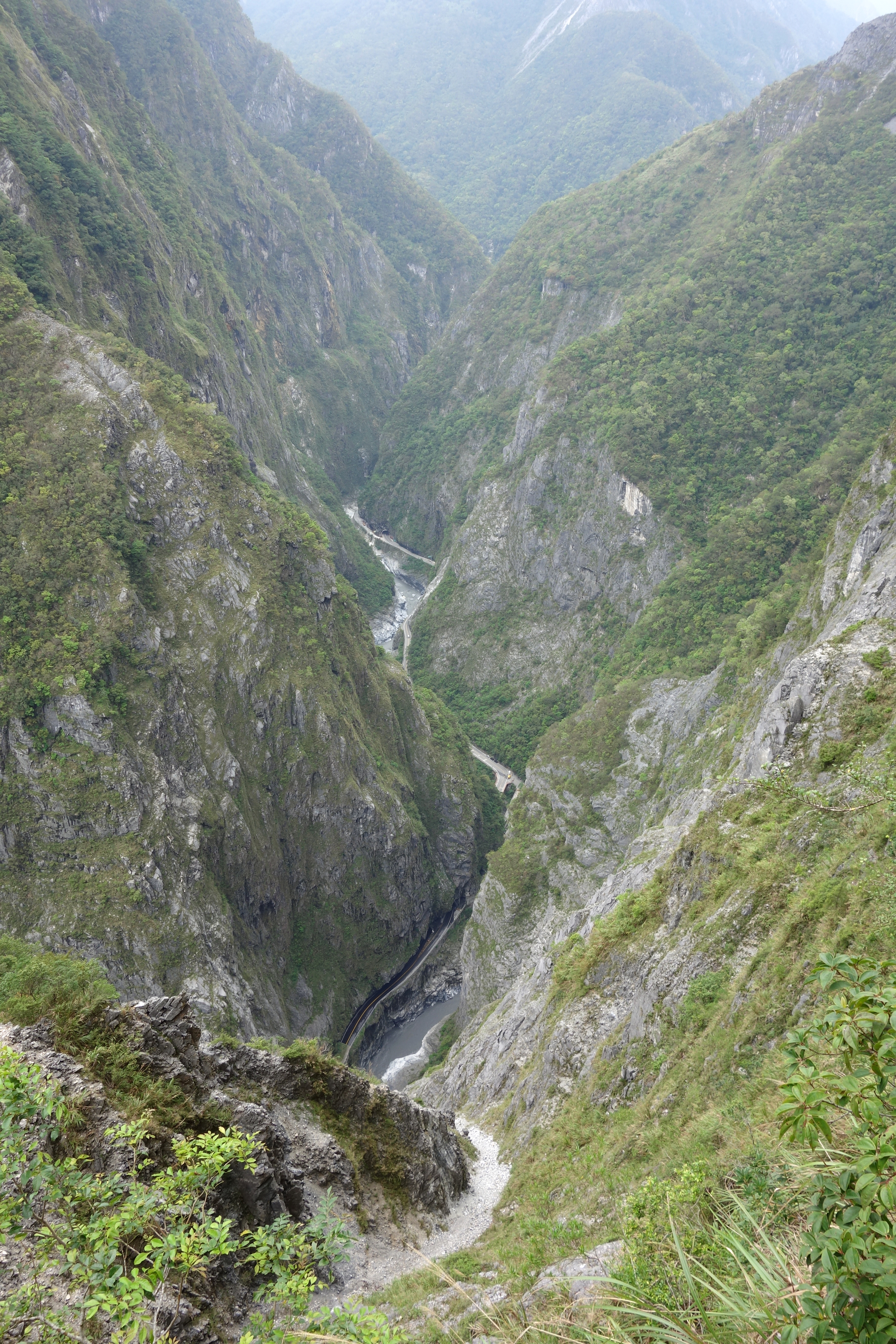
Taroko Gorge from Zhuilu Old Road

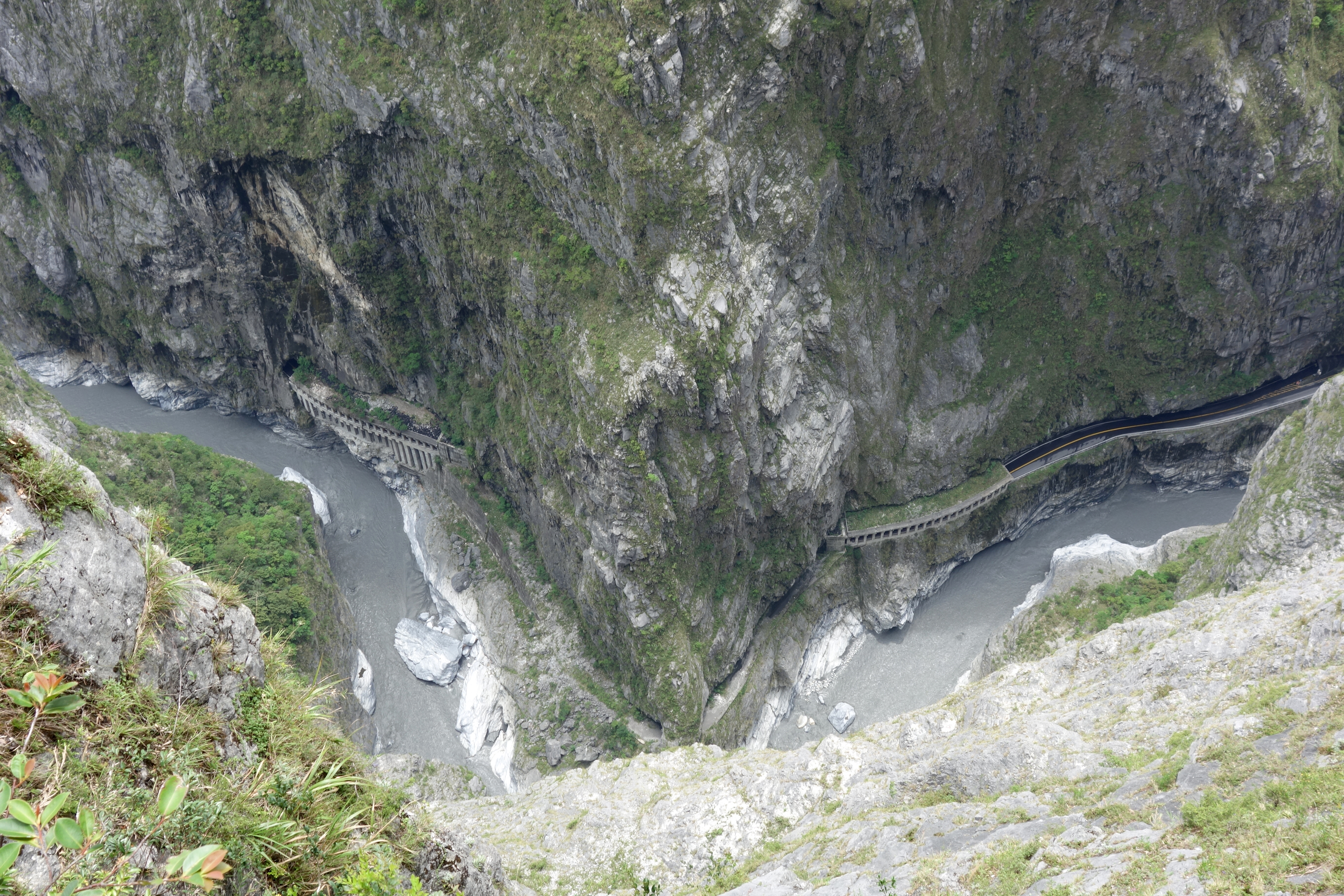
Zhuilu Tunnel from Zhuilu Old Road

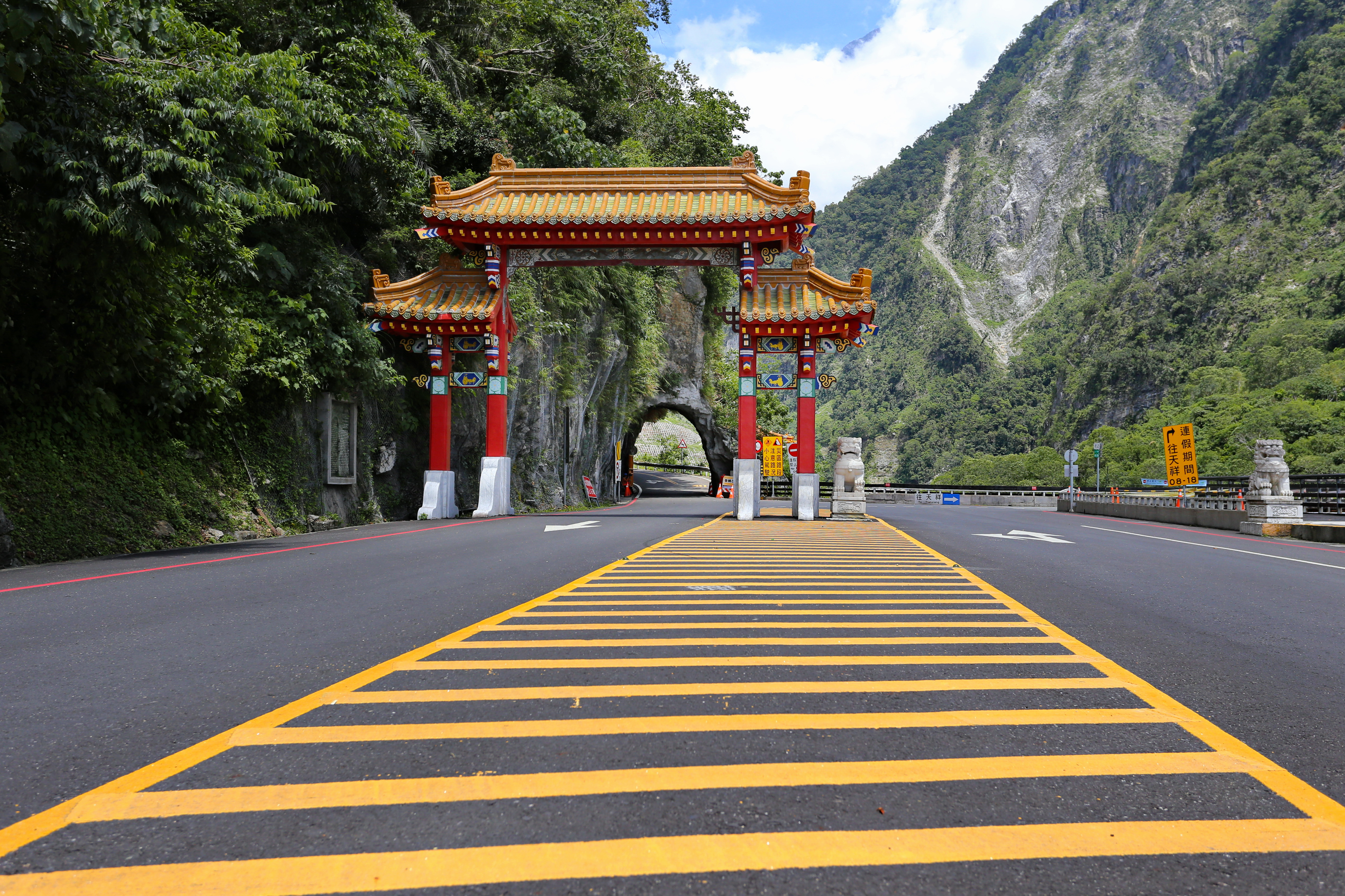
Taroko Archway

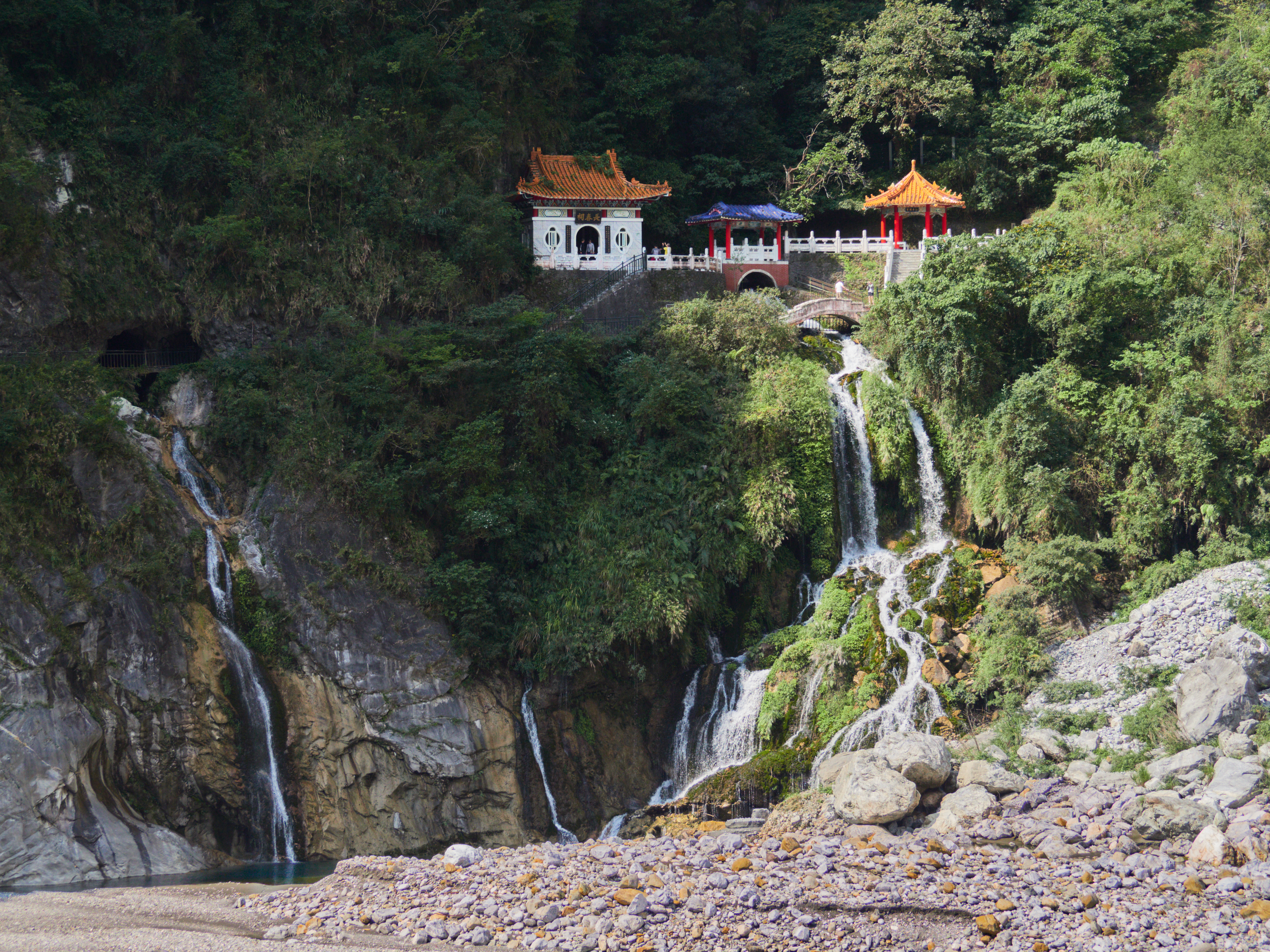
Eternal Spring Shrine, March 2024

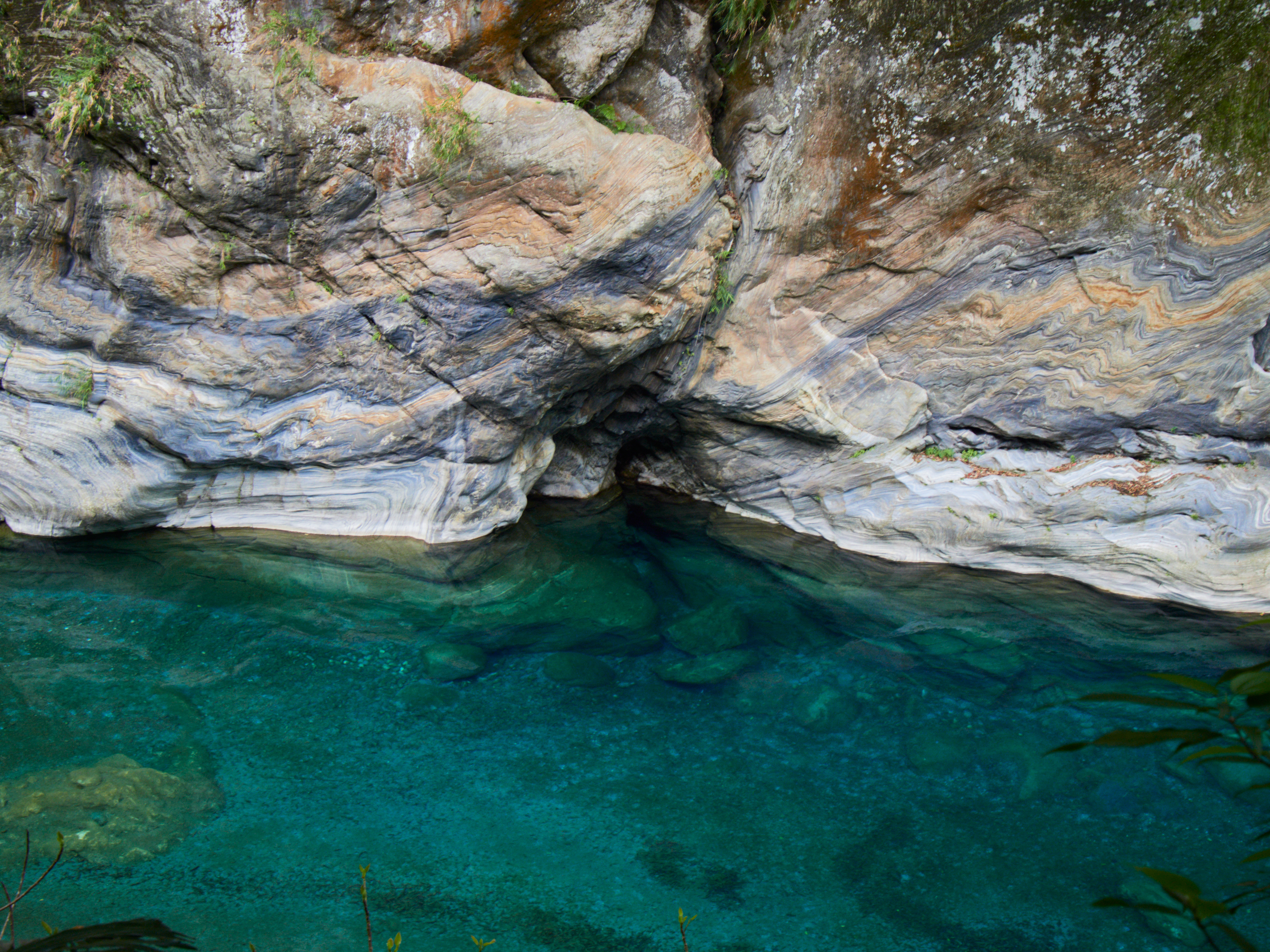
Marble and turqouise waters

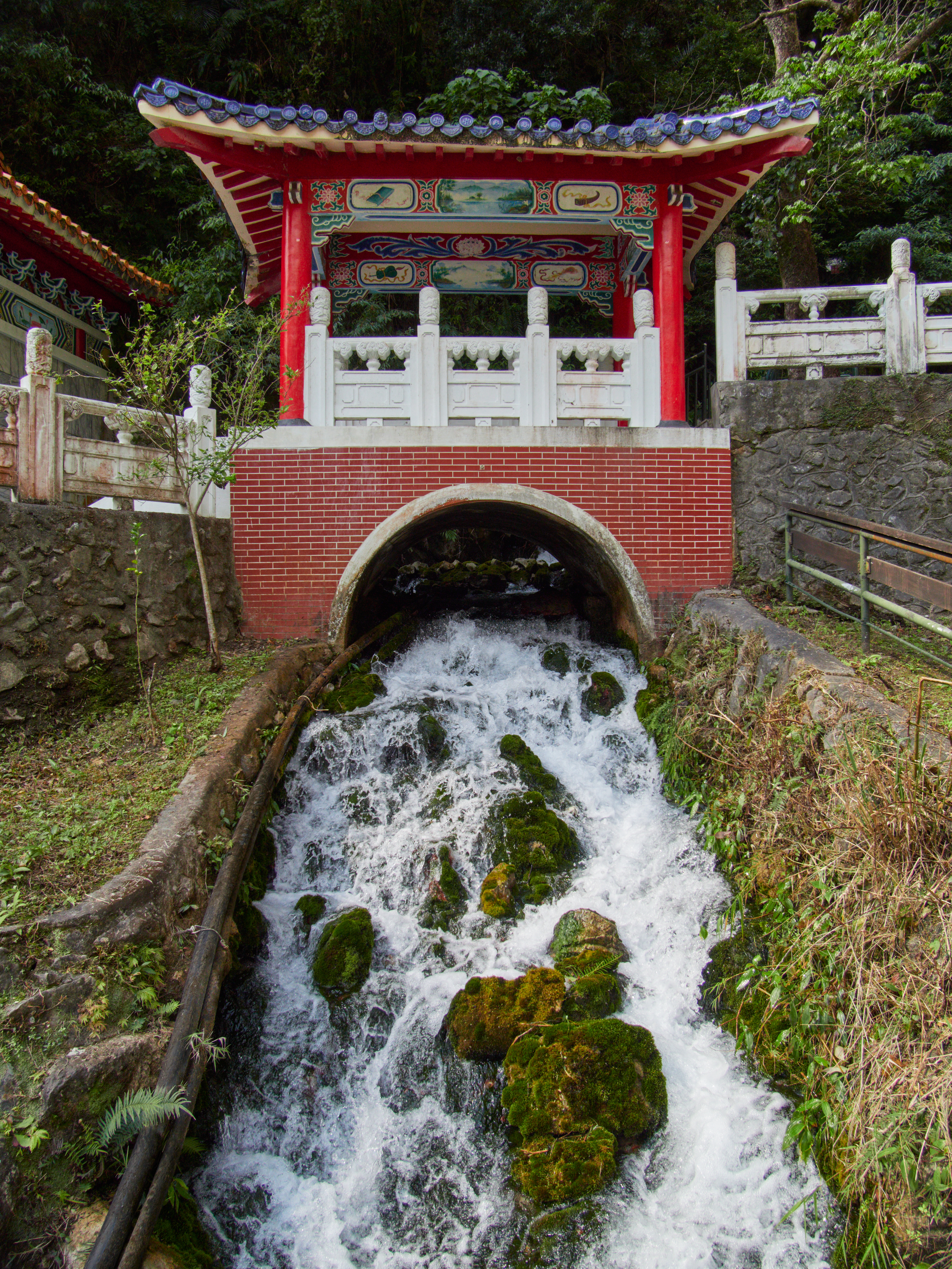
Eternal Spring Shrine, March 2024

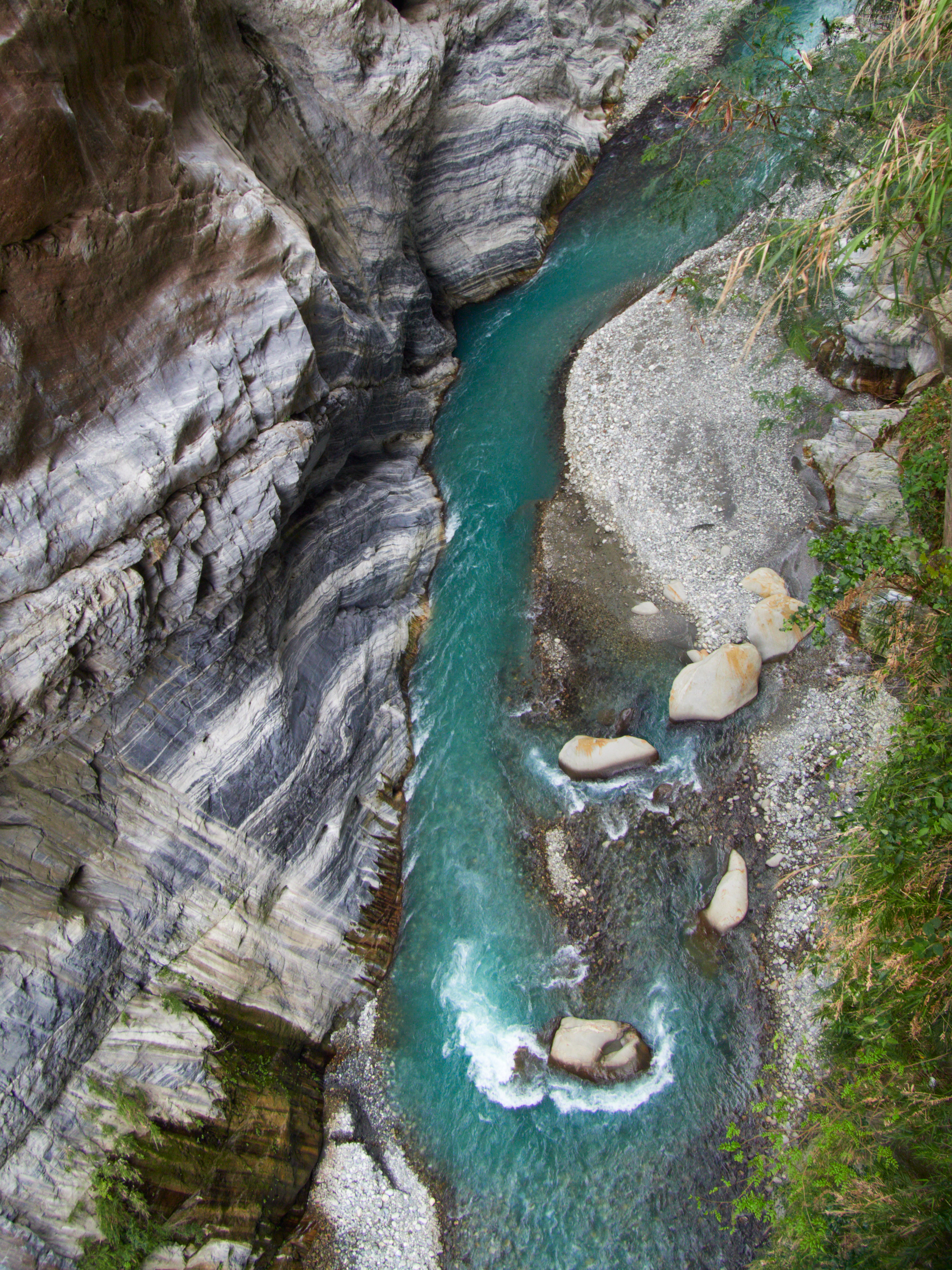
Taroko Gorge, from above

== See also ==
- List of national parks in Taiwan
