= Shakadang Trail =

Trail in Xiulin, Hualien County, Taiwan

Coordinates: 24°09′47.3″N 121°36′45.6″E

Shakadang Trail 砂卡礑步道
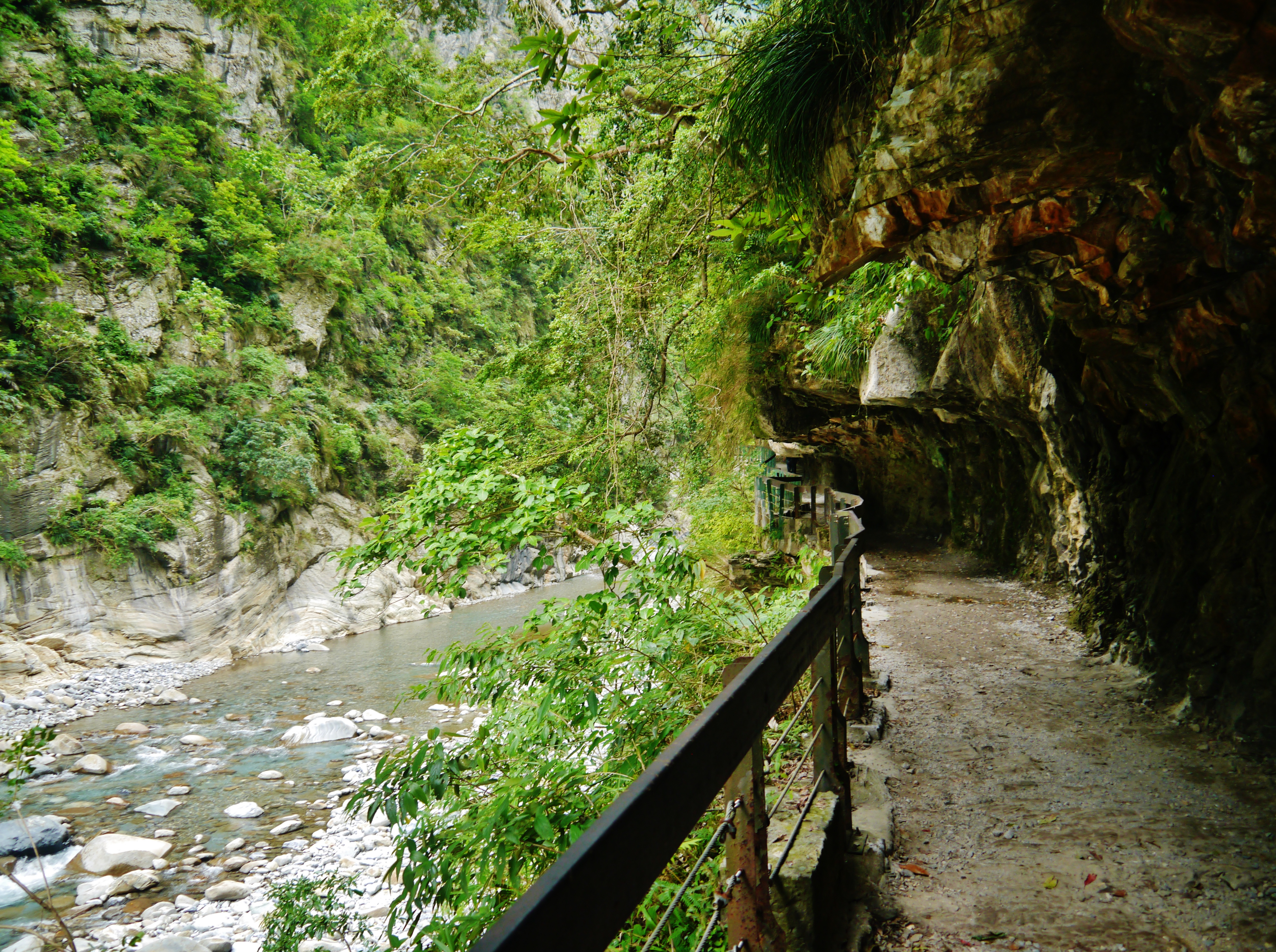
- Length: 4.1 km
- Location: Xiulin, Hualien County, Taiwan
- Use: walking

Shakadang Trail (Chinese: 砂卡礑步道; pinyin: Shākǎdàng Bùdào) or Mysterious Valley Trail is a trail in Taroko National Park, Xiulin Township, Hualien County, Taiwan.

== History ==
The trail was originally constructed during the Japanese rule of Taiwan as a path for the construction of Takkiri Power Plant. In 2001, it was renamed to Shakadang Trail. The trail was closed on 23 September until 1 November 2019, except on 10–13 October 2019. In April 2024 during the Hualien earthquake, seven people who were hiking along the trail were found dead due to rockslide.

== Geology ==
The trail spans over a length of 4.1 km. It follows along the Shakadang Stream. It begins at Shakadang Bridge, which has over 100 marble lions.

== See also ==
- List of roads in Taiwan
