= Mount Qilai =

Mountain in Nantou and Hualien, Taiwan

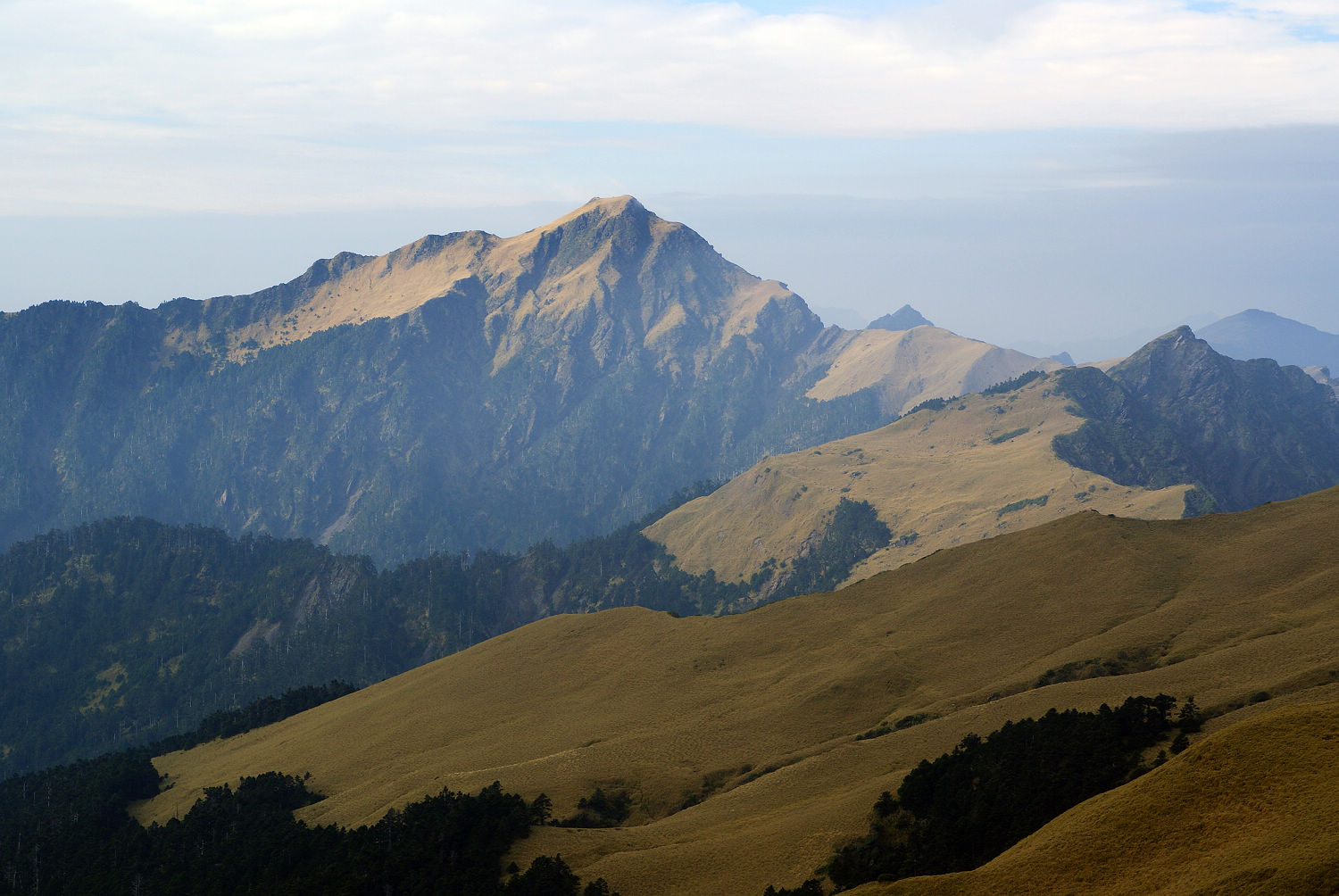

Highest point
- Elevation: 3,607 m (11,834 ft)
- Coordinates: 24°5′9.6″N 121°19′22.8″E

Naming
- Native name: 奇萊山 (Chinese)

Geography
- Location: Xiulin, Hualien County, Taiwan

Mount Qilai (Chinese: 奇萊山; Hanyu Pinyin: Qílái shān; Tongyong Pinyin: Cílái shan) is a mountain in Xiulin Township, Hualien County, Taiwan. Its highest point of the range, the Northern Peak, is 3,607 m (11,834 ft) above sea level. It is named after the Sakizaya people.

The mountain is a part of Taroko National Park within its Ecological Protection Area and requires a permit for visitors.

In 1971, Typhoon Nadine's effects caused the deaths of five National Tsing Hua University students hiking Mount Qilai. The following year, a separate group of three university students disappeared on Qilai. Police in Nantou and Hualien launched a delayed search effort, joined later by the Republic of China Air Force and Army. Although the search effort was unsuccessful, it inspired the establishment of permanent civilian rescue organizations in Taiwan.

== See also ==
- List of mountains in Taiwan
