= New Central Cross-Island Highway =

Highway system in Taiwan

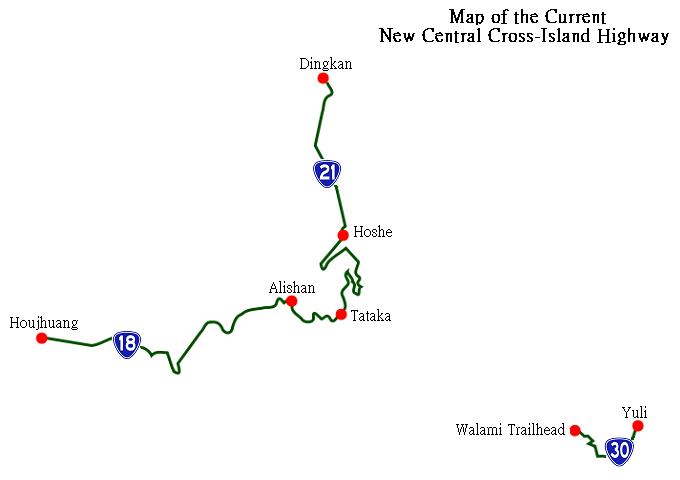
The New Central Cross-Island Highway, with a significant interrupted section, is a highway that does not fully traverse Taiwan.

The New Central Cross-Island Highway, also known as the New Central Trans-Island Highway, is an incomplete highway in Taiwan intended to connect the east and west across the central region of Taiwan Island. Positioned between the Central Cross-Island Highway and the Southern Cross-Island Highway, it centers on Jade Mountain and branches into three routes: Chiayi–Yushan, Shuili–Yushan, and Yuli–Yushan, forming a Y-shaped road network. Although designed around Yu Shan, the actual junction was initially planned at Shalixi Stream, later adjusted to Dongpu Mountain Pass, and is now known as Tatajia, the highway's highest point at 2,610 meters.

In the 1970s, during the Ten Major Construction Projects, the Republic of China government planned to build three new cross-island highways, (Note: According to “After the Completion of the Ten Major Construction Projects, It Was Decided to Proceed with Twelve More Projects”, both terms — “three newly constructed cross-island highways” and “three newly constructed east–west cross-island highways” — were used [5]. This explains why the highways are sometimes referred to as the “three newly constructed cross-island highways” and other times as the “three newly constructed east–west cross-island highways.”) listed as one of the Twelve Major Construction Projects. By the 1980s, construction of the New Central Cross-Island Highway faced challenges due to growing ecological awareness and the establishment of Yushan National Park along its route, creating a turning point between highway development and environmental conservation. After six years of policy indecision, construction was briefly permitted to extend westward to Dafen (Note: According to Lin Shiman’s consultation of Ronggong Bulletin, issue no. 928, front page, the construction project of the New Central Cross-Island Highway began in 1981 and was entirely undertaken by the Retired Servicemen Engineering Agency.) by the Veterans Engineering Agency (now Retired Servicemen's Engineering Agency). However, following an Environmental Impact Assessment, the Executive Yuan issued an order to abandon construction, resulting in partial completion and the highway opening on January 1, 1991, as a "highway without full traversal."

== History ==
=== Background and origin ===
On September 20, 1974, recognizing that the existing three east–west cross-island highways were insufficient for regional development, the Executive Yuan planned to construct three additional highways in northern, central, and southern Taiwan to promote balanced regional growth. On September 23, 1977, these were included in the Twelve Major Construction Projects, to be implemented after the Ten Major Projects were completed. The rugged terrain between Chiayi and Yuli, located in central Taiwan and the Huadong Valley, necessitated reliance on the Central or Southern Cross-Island Highways. The New Central Cross-Island Highway was proposed to improve connectivity, reduce transportation distances, and stimulate prosperity in eastern Taiwan for balanced development. Additionally, the route's rich mountain resources supported forestry, agriculture, and mining, while its scenic alpine landscapes and diverse forests, combined with the Third Inland Longitudinal Highway plan, linked attractions like Sun Moon Lake, Alishan, and Zengwen Dam, forming a tourism corridor.

=== Construction process ===
==== Route selection and survey ====
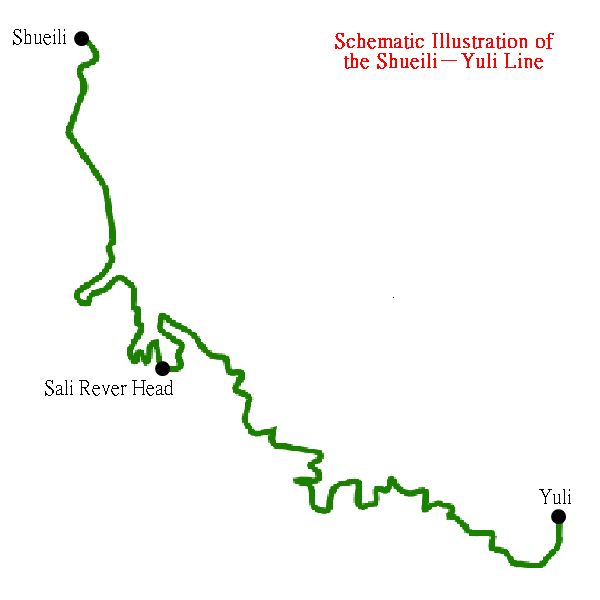
The initial plan for the New Central Cross-Island Highway was from Shuili via Shalixi Stream and Batongguan to Yuli, tentatively named the "Shuili–Shalixi Stream–Yuli Line."

The Taiwan Provincial Highway Bureau selected routes using 1:50,000 topographic maps, identifying lines including Wulai-Yilan Line, Wushe-Tongmen Line, Shuili-Fenglin Line, Chiayi-Yuli Line, and Sandimen-Zhiben Line. The Chiayi-Yuli Line, the New Central Cross-Island Highway, required the most surveyors and the longest route. On October 15, 1975, a survey team of 14 units started from Heshe, following the Batongguan Historic Trail, bypassing the ridge route from Dashuiku, and proceeding along Laonong Stream. The route crossed the Central Mountain Range between Dashuiku and Jianshan, followed Kuokuosi Stream, passed through Dafen, and descended along Lakulaku River, reaching Yuli on October 25. Communication during the survey relied on carrier pigeons.

==== Plan evolution ====
The Shuili-Yuli Line's section through Xinyi Township was deemed as economically significant as the Chiayi-Alishan road. To facilitate construction, the Chiayi-Yushan Line was incorporated, extending eastward from Alishan to connect with the original route, forming the prototype of the three-line highway. In May 1978, the Executive Yuan approved the Chiayi-Yushan, Shuili-Yushan, and Yuli-Yushan Lines, with a total length of 265.6 km and a budget of NT$3.62 billion, expecting completion in six years. The addition of the Chiayi-Yushan Line led to the establishment of the New Cross-Island Highway Engineering Office in October 1978, dispatching a survey team to the Chiayi-Yushan Line in November. In April 1979, route finalization began, with the junction planned at Shalixi Stream at 2,100 meters. Due to urgent needs, improvements to the Chiayi-Alishan section of the Chiayi-Yushan Line started in 1977. Construction on the Chiayi-Yushan Line began in September 1979, followed by the Shuili-Yushan Line in January 1980. (Note: Regarding the start date of construction on the Shuili–Yushan route, in Ye Zhaoxiong’s article "The Development of the New Central Cross-Island Route and the Abandonment Process of the Yuli–Yushan Segment", it is recorded as July 1979.) In October 1980, due to unfavorable terrain at Shalixi Stream, the junction was relocated to near Tatajia Saddle at 2,500 meters. In November 1980, surveys revealed that both the Chiayi-Yushan and Shuili-Yushan Lines passed close to Front Peak of Yushan, raising maintenance concerns. The junction was finalized at Dongpu Mountain Pass at 2,610 meters, shortening the Chiayi-Yushan Line by 7.5 km.

==== Conservation and development ====
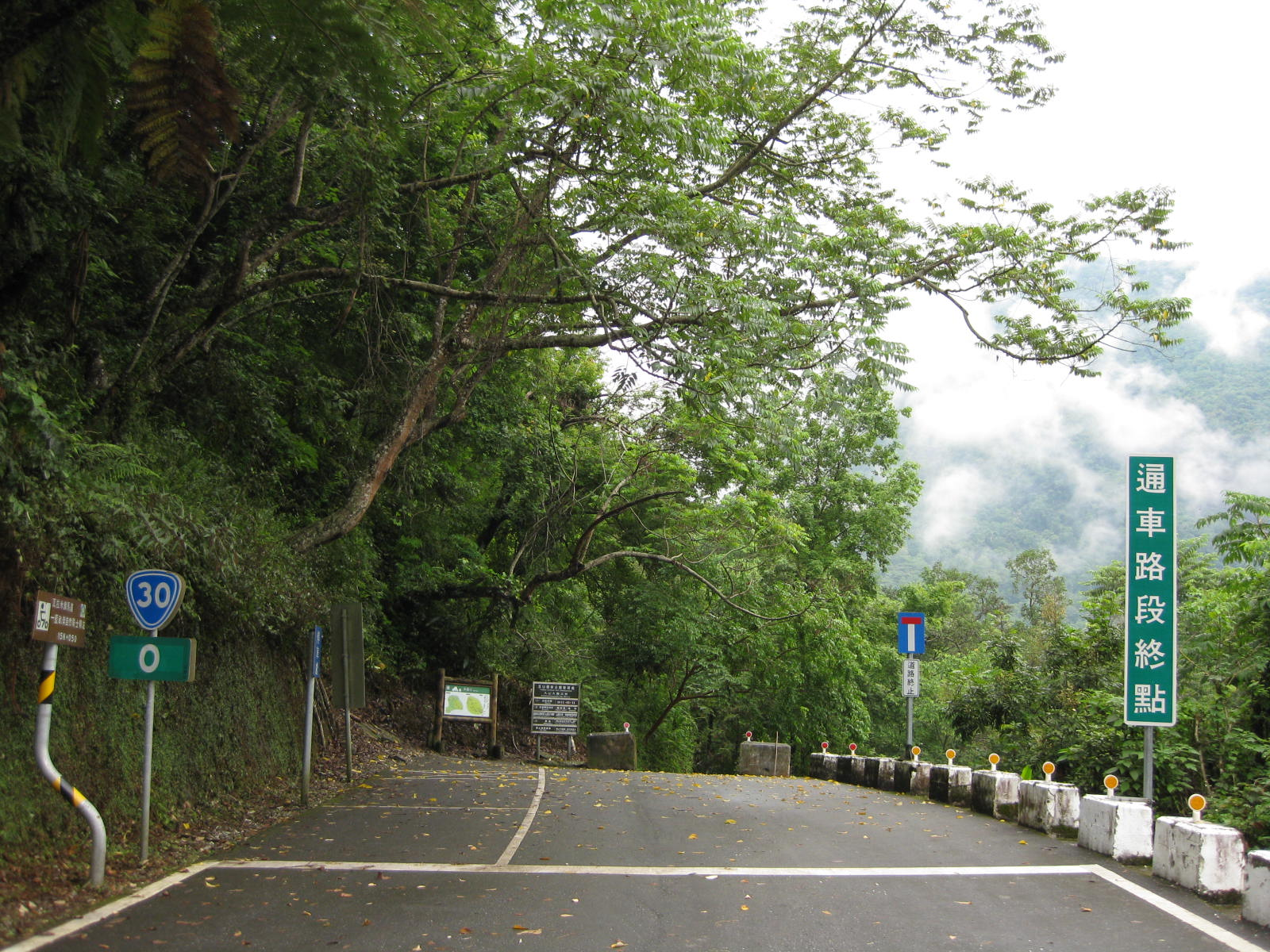
The starting point of Taiwan Route 30 at the Walami Trailhead. The government's decision to protect the natural environment halted the Yuli-Yushan Line after 14.6 km, leaving its starting point deep in the mountains at the 192 km mark of Taiwan Route 18, creating a dead-end road.

Construction on the Yuli-Yushan Line began in July 1981. With 97 km planned through Yushan National Park, rising ecological concerns drew attention from the public and academia. In June 1983, to comply with the Ministry of the Interior's three principles—no routes above 2,600 meters, avoiding Batongguan, and bypassing Yushan National Park—the Taiwan Provincial Highway Bureau proposed three routes from Tatajia Saddle to Dafen. Only the fourth route, along a forest road through Meilan Saddle to Meishankou connecting to the Southern Cross-Island Highway, met these criteria, but it was deemed inefficient. An environmental impact assessment by the China Engineering Consultants, Inc. concluded that construction would cause environmental damage, including soil erosion, and conflict with Yushan National Park's conservation goals. The Taiwan Provincial Government decided to abandon the project. On April 3, 1986, the Executive Yuan halted the Yuli-Yushan Line, and on May 31, 1989, deferred any resumption pending further evaluation. In 1991, the Executive Yuan permanently canceled the Yuli-Yushan Line.

==== Completion and opening ====
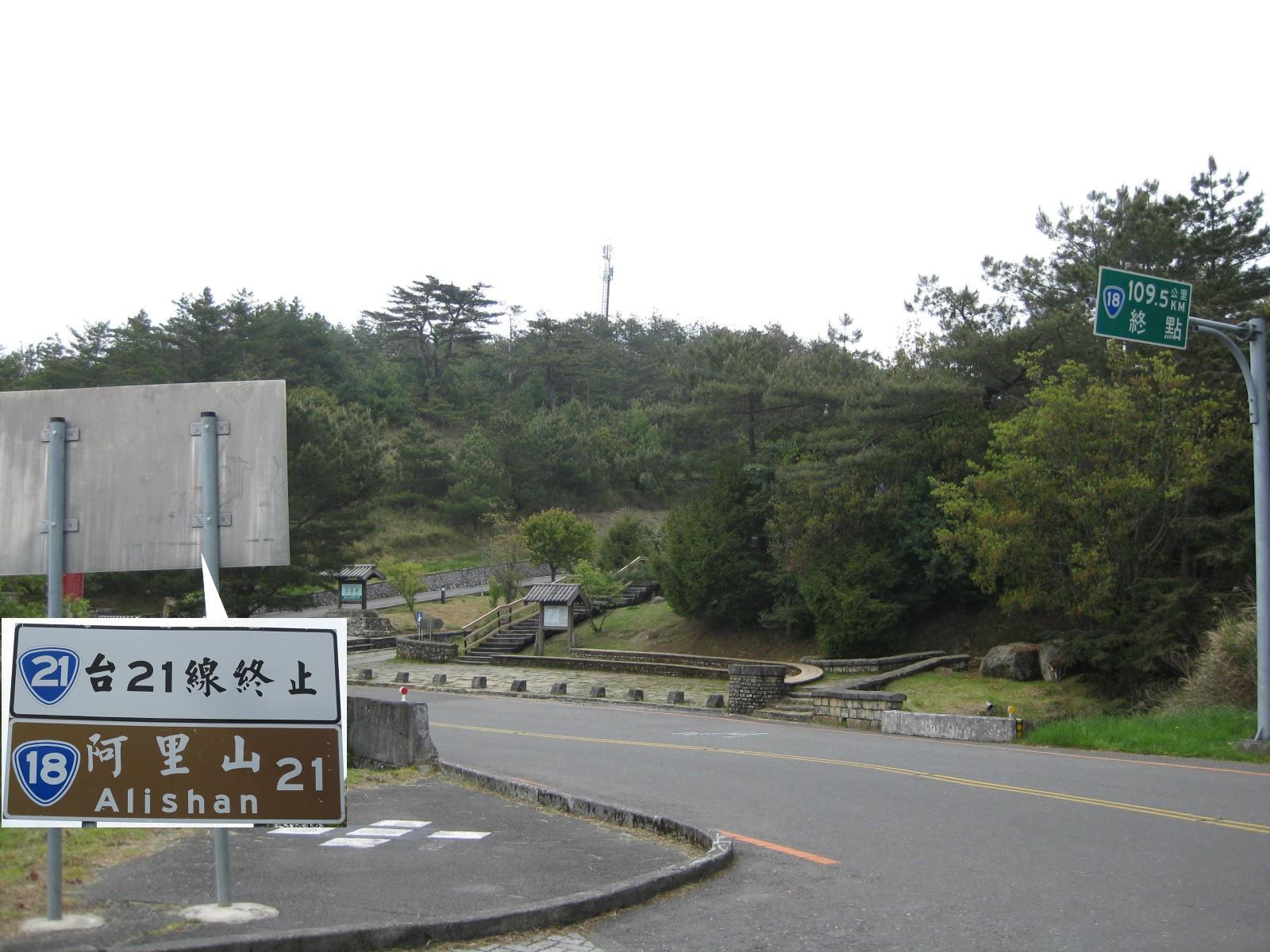
The junction at Dongpu Mountain Pass, now called Tatajia, marks the end of Taiwan Route 18 and Taiwan Route 21 after the Yuli-Yushan Line was abandoned.

The Chiayi-Yushan Line's Chiayi-Alishan section was completed and opened on September 30, 1982. The Shuili-Yushan Line's Dingkan-Shenmu Village section opened in January 1983. The Chiayi-Yushan Line was fully completed in June 1986. The Shuili-Yushan Line faced delays due to geological sliding at the 47K–53K section, completing in December 1990 and opening on January 1, 1991. This connected Chiayi and Shuili, but the Yuli-Yushan Line's interruption left Dongpu Mountain Pass, now Tatajia, as the junction of the Chiayi-Yushan and Shuili-Yushan Lines, with the Shuili-Yushan Line designated as the southern section of Taiwan Route 21, extending over 390 km.

=== Maintenance ===
To address road and bridge disruptions from typhoons and heavy rain, the Directorate General of Highways began rehabilitation in 2002, dividing the Taiwan Route 21 95K–114K section into two projects. The Shiba Stream Bridge, Chenyoulan River Bridge, and Bishishi Bridge started construction in December 2003, followed by Songquan, Shenhe, and Aiyu Bridges in March 2004, using long-span box steel beams. On October 26, 2006, these six bridges were completed. Due to mudflows and slope collapses at the southern end of the Fengqiu-Ming Tunnel, the Directorate planned the "Taiwan Route 21 Fengqiu-Ming Tunnel Bridge Reconstruction" in 2006.

On January 9, 2007, to accommodate the opening of the Yuchang Highway, a 15 km section of Taiwan Route 18 was merged into Taiwan Route 30. In June 2007, to align with the opening of Chiayi HSR Station, the Directorate extended the Alishan Highway's starting point westward, increasing its length by nearly 14 km to 109.9 km, ending at Tatajia. On September 14, 2008, Typhoon Sinlaku destroyed the Wuhuliao Bridge. In March 2009, reconstruction of the Wuhuliao Bridge began 300 meters downstream, completed on July 31, 2010. On March 27, 2009, the Fengqiu-Ming Tunnel bridge project was completed, renaming the Shalidong Bridge to Shalidong Bridge.

== Route description ==
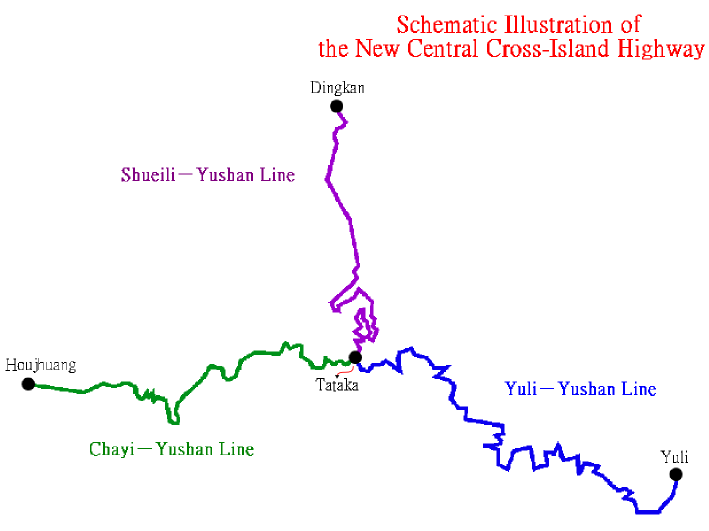
The New Central Cross-Island Highway forms a Y-shaped network. The routes shown differ from the original plan.

Initially, the highway was planned to start in Shuili, Nantou, passing through Shalixi Stream and Batongguan, and ending in Yuli, Hualien. The Chiayi-Yushan Line was later included due to the economic importance of the Chiayi-Alishan road, with the three lines—Chiayi-Yushan Line, Shuili-Yushan Line, and Yuli-Yushan Line—forming a Y-shaped network converging at Shalixi Stream. The Chiayi-Yushan and Yuli-Yushan Lines, spanning approximately 204 km, were intended to connect eastern and western Taiwan across the island's central region. (Note: Before the adjustment, the original Chiayi–Yushan Line and Yuli–Yushan Line were incorporated into Provincial Highway No. 18. According to the 60th Anniversary Special Issue of the Directorate General of Highways, published in 2006, the total mileage from Chiayi to Yuli along Highway No. 18 was 207.01 kilometres (128.63 mi). Since adjustments to Highway No. 18 began in 2007, the most recent documented mileage before the adjustment has been cited.) After multiple revisions, the current highway is described below.

=== Chiayi-Yushan Line ===
The Chiayi-Yushan Line, also known as the Chiayi-Yushan Section, stretches 90.2 km from Houzhuang in Chiayi to Dongpu Mountain Pass. It traverses Zhongpu, Fanlu, Zhuqi, Alishan, and Xinyi Township, Nantou. The route is divided at Chukou into lowland and mountain sections: west of Chukou (16.8 km) involves upgraded existing roads through Houzhuang, Geology Along the Route from Chukou to Tatajia Saddle on the New Central Cross-Island Highway in Taiwan, and Wufeng Temple, crossing Bazhang River to Chukou; east of Chukou (73.4 km) is mountainous, with new sections at 20K–24K, 60K–66K, and from 72K using a former logging railway, passing Chukou, Longmei, Xiding, Shizhuo, Shizi, Alishan, Zizhong, and Xingaokou to Dongpu Mountain Pass. Upon completion, it was incorporated into Taiwan Route 18 with the Yuli-Yushan Line. (Note: The designation of Provincial Highway No. 18 follows the numbering system established by the Directorate General of Highways, in which east-west routes are assigned even numbers.) After adjustments, Taiwan Route 18 covers Taibao to Tatajia, commonly called the Alishan Highway.

==== Geography ====
The Chiayi-Yushan Line runs east–west across the Jianan Plain, Chiayi Hills, and Alishan Mountains. Centered on Jade Mountain, the route follows the northern side of a ridge extending westward to the Alishan Mountains, serving as a watershed between the Choshui River and Kaoping River, with tributaries like Nanzixi River, Boboyou Stream, Haomagaban Stream, and Shalixian Stream. The line ends at the junction of Taiwan Route 21 and Taiwan Route 18 at Dongpu Mountain Pass (2,610 meters), a saddle between Dongpu and Lulin Mountains. In Chiayi County, it crosses the Bazhang, Zengwen, and Qingshui Rivers. From the Jianan Plain, it follows the Bazhang River to Chukou, a valley exit with overlapping alluvial fans and terraced landforms like Neipu and Kezhuang Terraces. After crossing the Bazhang River, it winds through the Duzuo Stream valley, climbing from 250 to 1,070 meters, following the Bazhang-Zengwen watershed from Longmei and the Qingshui-Zengwen watershed past Furong Mountain. The upper Zengwen River, known as Houdapu Stream, (Note: The main source of the Zengwen River lies in the Hou Dabu Stream and the Tefuye Stream, both of which originate from Dongshuishan. They can be reached via the Tefuye Historic Trail. From this, the upper reaches of the river can be understood, and according to the Administrative Map of Alishan Township, Chiayi County, the course of the Hou Dabu Stream is shown to run close to Provincial Highway 18.) penetrates into the Alishan mountain range, the riverbed is noticeably narrow, forming a gorge with steep terrain on both sides.

Geologically, from the Tatajia Fault to the Gongtian Fault, the Alishan Highway primarily crosses the Nanzhuang Formation, except for the Furong Mountain section's Guandaoshan Sandstone. Between the Gongtian and Chukou Fault, it encounters the Zhuolan Formation, Nangang Formation (including Heshe Formation), (Note: Geologist Liu Zhanjiang investigated the geological structure of the Heshe anticline and named the Heshe Formation, which is exposed on both limbs of the Tongfushan syncline along the New Central Cross-Island Highway. Geologist He Chunsun included this formation together with the Nangang Formation in An Introduction to the Geology of Taiwan. According to the legend of the geological maps, the Geological Map Along the New Central Cross-Island Highway from Chiayi to Yushan to Shuili shows the Nangang Formation, while the Geological Map Along the Shuili–Yushan Route shows the Heshe Formation. The Heshe Formation is also recorded in A Geological Overview of the Dongpu–Southern Yushan Section and The Natural and Engineering Environment of the Shuili Branch of the New Central Cross-Island Highway.) Jinshui Shale, Shiliufen Shale, and Dawo Sandstone, with synclines, anticlines, and faults, and Dawo Sandstone exposed near Renai Bridge. West of the Chukou Fault, the Bazhang River influences alluvial and terrace deposits, with the Toukeshan Formation in terraces and alluvial deposits beyond the Wuhuliao Bridge.

==== Disasters ====
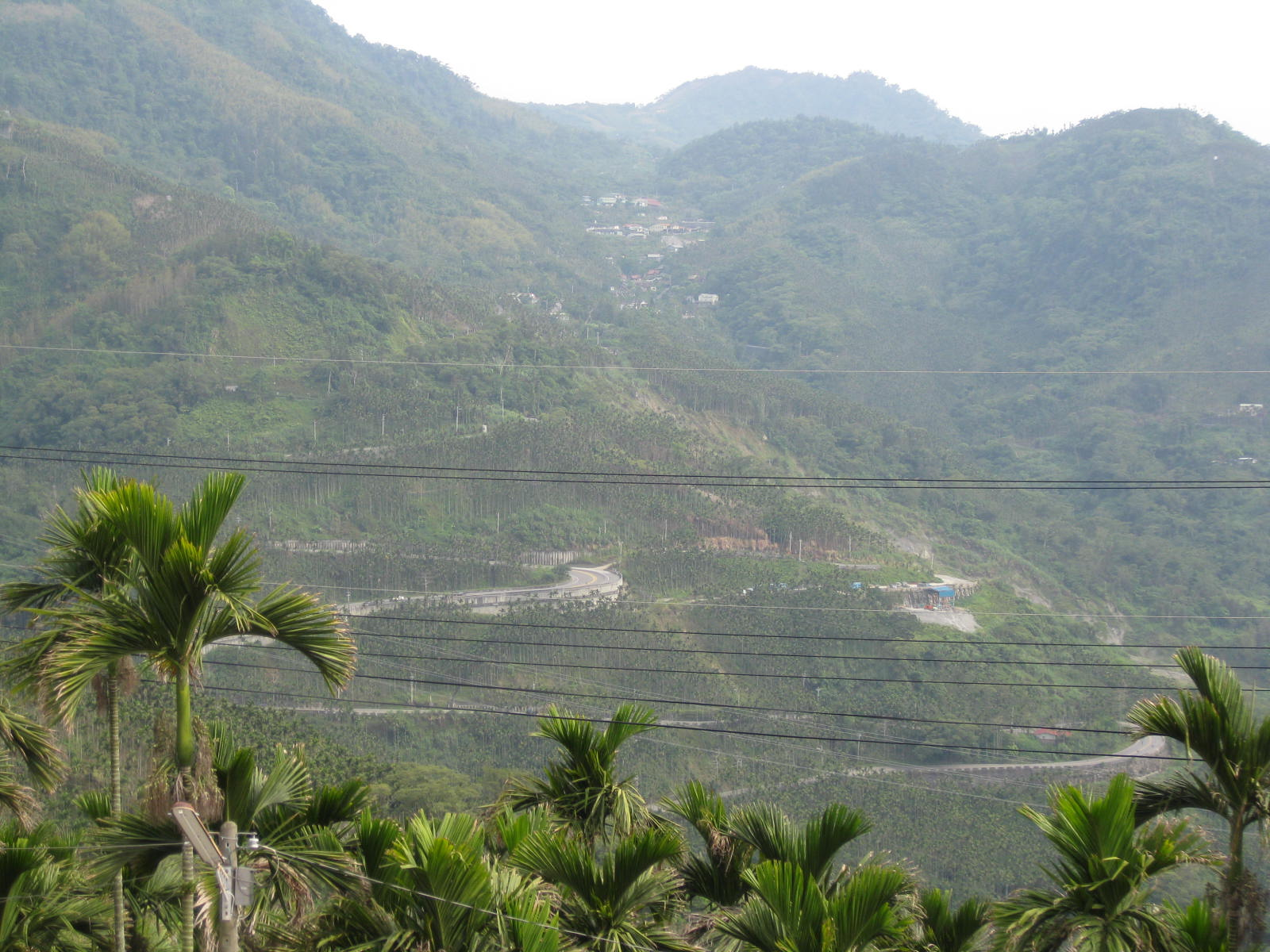
The "Five Bends" section of the Alishan Highway, visible from Gongtian, climbs in a zigzag pattern. Since opening in 1982, it has been prone to landslides, now mitigated through remediation and monitoring.

Post-921 Earthquake data indicates that slopes facing north, west, or south with gradients over 55% and within 200 meters of water systems are prone to collapses. From 1984 to 1994, 95% of collapses were triggered by heavy rain eroding unstable rock layers, concentrated at 20K–25K (41.9%), 55K–60K (39.2%), and 65K–70K (39.2%), with 91% causing road damage. The 43K–45K section, a 50-hectare landslide zone called "Five Bends" due to its five hairpin turns, was listed as Taiwan's most dangerous road in 2006. Affected by the Tatou Fault and Gongtian Fault, its fragile rock layers, infiltrated by rainwater, combined with erosion from a Duzuo Stream tributary, cause landslides during typhoons, with an average slide of 1.8 cm annually from May to September. Remediation, including Duzuo Stream bank protection, slope stabilization, and drainage, along with monitoring instruments, has reduced risks.

=== Shuili-Yushan Line ===
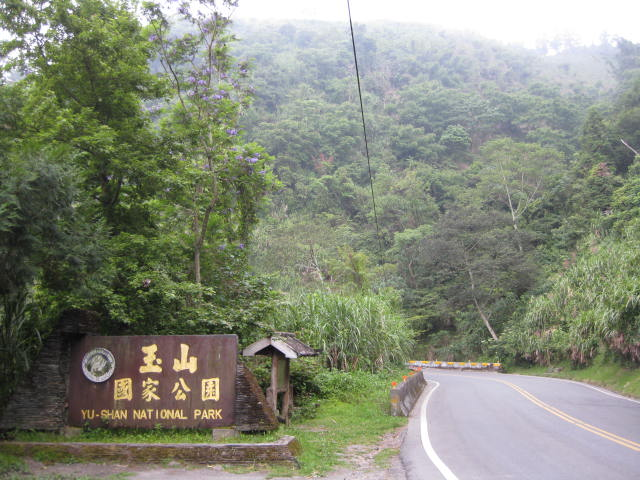
With the Yuli-Yushan Line abandoned, only the Shuili-Yushan and Chiayi-Yushan Lines pass through Yushan National Park, as shown by the park boundary marker at Taiwan Route 21's 119K.

The Shuili-Yushan Line, or Shuili-Yushan Section, spans 71 km from Dingkan Village in Shuili to Dongpu Mountain Pass, entirely within Nantou County through Shuili and Xinyi Townships. The Dingkan to Shenmu Village section (34.3 km) upgraded existing roads, while the Shenmu Village to Dongpu Mountain Pass section (36.7 km) was newly built. North of Heshe, the route follows the Chenyoulan River, transitioning to the Zhuoshui River near Longshen Bridge. It passes Dingkan, Xinshan, Junkeng, Shangan, Xinyi, and Fengqiu. After crossing the Chenyoulan River, it shifts to the west bank, following Heshe Stream's west bank past Heshe, then climbs sharply along the Dongpu Mountain Block watershed from Heshe Stream's east bank to Shalixian Stream's west bank, using hairpin turns through Tongfu Mountain to align with the Dongpu Mountain ridge to Dongpu Mountain Pass. It is part of Taiwan Route 21, (Note: The original plan for Provincial Highway 21 was to begin in Xindian and head south, ending at Zhuanziyao where it would connect with Highway 1. Today, the completed Highway 21 runs from Tianleng in the north to Linyuan in the south, and the Shuili–Yushan route is incorporated within Highway 21. Highway 21 follows the provincial highway numbering system set by the Directorate General of Highways, in which north–south routes are assigned odd numbers.) known as the "Third Inland Longitudinal Highway" due to its proximity to the Central Mountain Range. Taiwan Route 21 was initially planned from Xindian to Zhuozikiln, now spanning Tianleng to Linyuan, encompassing the Shuili-Yushan Line.

==== Geography ====
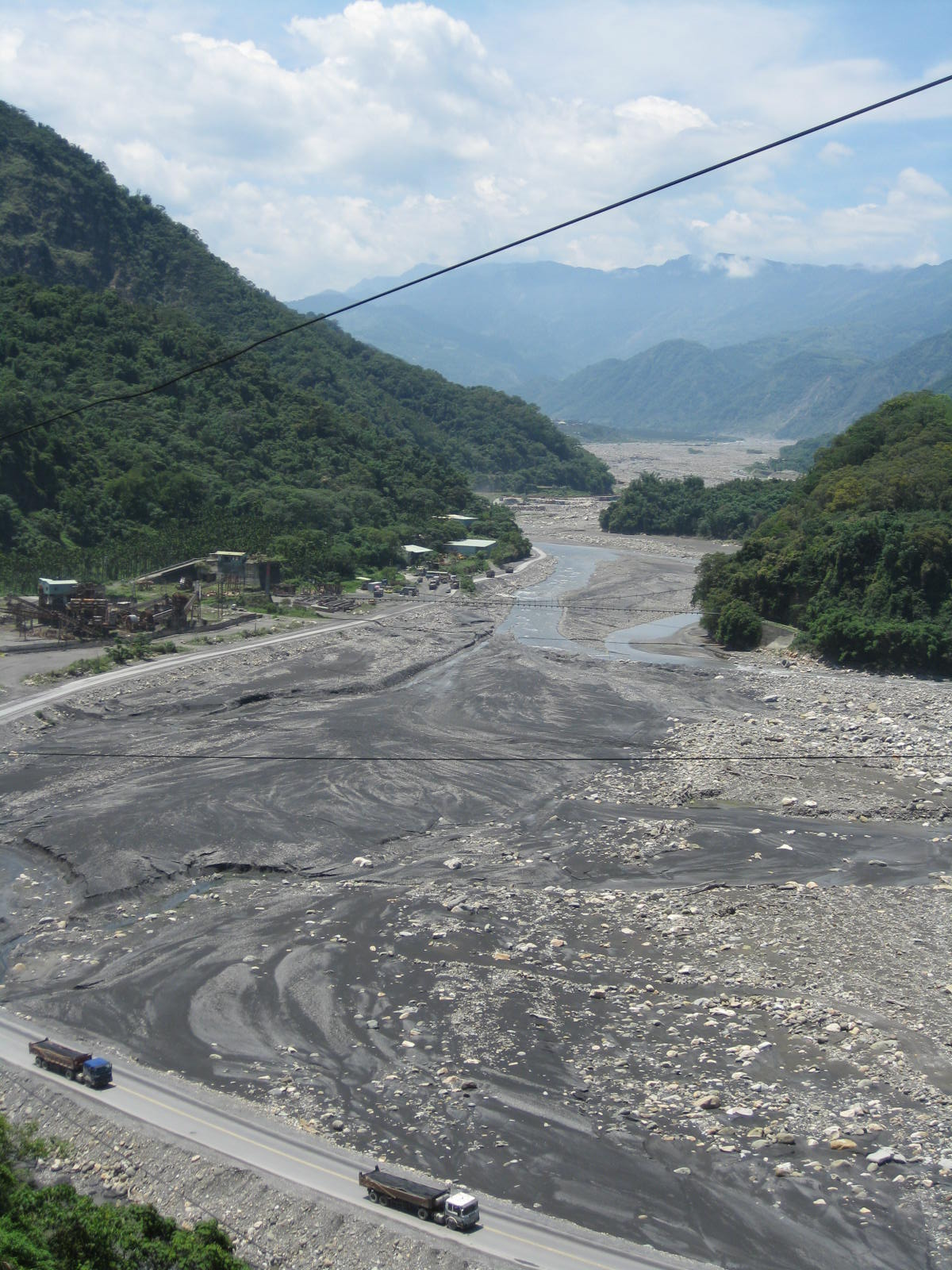
The Chenyoulan River Valley, a fault-formed longitudinal valley. Note: The road with gravel trucks in the lower left is a riverbed construction path, not the New Central Cross-Island Highway.

The topography of the Shuili-Yushan Line is defined by the Dongpu Mountain Block and the Chenyoulan River Valley, located in southern and northern segments, respectively, for clarity in description. The southern segment traverses the Dongpu Mountain Block, part of the Alishan Mountain Range, with a north–south ridge forming a watershed between Heshe Stream and Shalixian Stream. The highway follows the eastern face of the Dongpu Mountain Block, where tributaries of Shalixian Stream, such as Wuqian Stream and Dayong Bridge, have carved erosive gullies due to vigorous erosion From Wuqian Stream to Tatajia, terrain constraints force the highway into multiple hairpin turns, a section geographer Wang Xin calls the "Great Hairpin Bend." At the Dongpu Mountain segment, the route aligns roughly parallel to the ridge. The northern segment follows the Chenyoulan River, constrained by the longitudinal valley's fault-formed topography. Near the Chenyoulan River Bridge, a bare cliff on the river's eastern bank reveals a fault plane, evidence of fault activity nearly parallel to the valley. Along the Shuili-Yushan Line, the Chenyoulan River watershed features 16 alluvial fans, later terraced by erosional rejuvenation. Large terraced fans at Xinxian and Luona are among Taiwan's most extensive, supporting settlements. Due to their elevation above the highway, most fans, except for smaller ones near Junkeng, are not fully visible.

Geologically, the Shuili-Yushan Line's distribution reflects the Dongpu Mountain Block and Chenyoulan River Valley. West of the Tatajia Fault, the Dongpu Mountain Block crosses fragile rock layers due to gullies, the Shenmu Fault, Shibazhe Fault, Ertai Fault, and Heshe Anticline. Except for the Nangang Formation exposed at the Tongfu Mountain syncline, the segment primarily crosses the Nanzhuang Formation. Beyond Heshe Stream, the highway enters alluvial and terrace deposits influenced by the Chenyoulan River and its tributaries. The Shiba Stream Bridge spans Shiba Stream, with the Shiba Stream Formation on both banks. Near Longshen Bridge, where the highway hugs a cliff, the geology transitions between the Baileng Formation and alluvial layers, with the Baileng Formation exposed on the Choshui River's eastern bank. At Dingkan, the Shuichangliu and Baileng Formations dominate.

==== Disasters ====
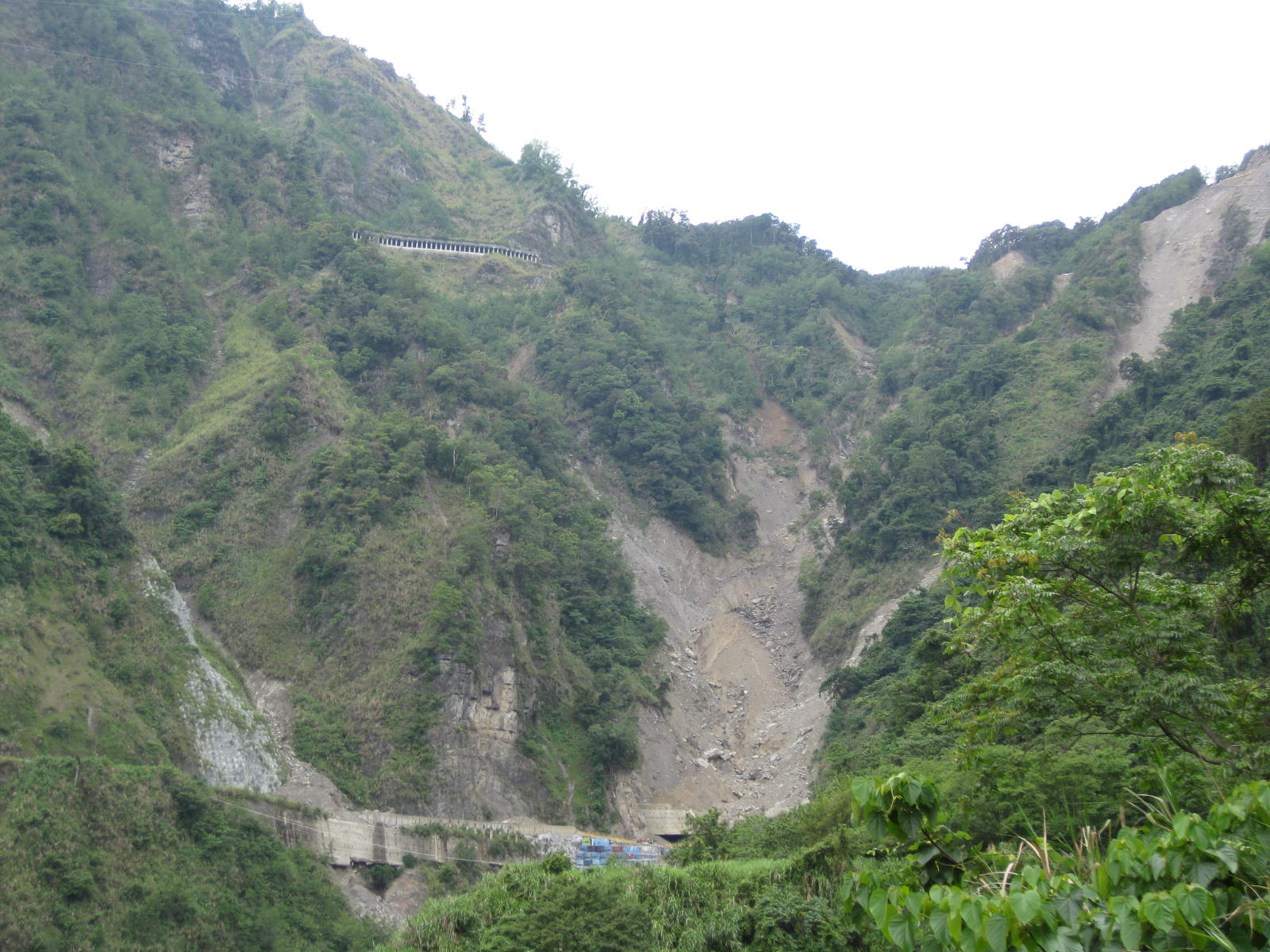
The collapse of Wuqian Stream's riverbed destroyed a bridge, caused not only by heavy rain but also by fault-induced geological fragility.

The Chenyoulan River's numerous alluvial fans result from collapse zones within its watershed. Steep, short valleys, complex geology, and fractured rock layers, combined with upstream erosion, lateral erosion, rainfall, and earthquakes, cause debris to slide or roll into valleys. During typhoons or monsoons, accumulated debris forms mudflows when heavy rain mobilizes it. Insufficient drainage clogs bridge openings, leading to impacts from debris and boulders, causing bridge loss, tilting, or deck displacement. For example, Typhoon Herb destroyed Xinxing Bridge, damaged Xinyi and Junkeng Bridges, clogged Chenyoulan River Bridge's openings, and exposed its piers. Typhoon Toraji washed away one end of Xinyi Bridge and destroyed Chenyoulan River, Songquan, Aiyu, and Shenhe Bridges. Typhoon Sinlaku buried the southern entrance of the Fengqiu-Ming Tunnel, and Typhoon Morakot destroyed the Wuqian Stream Bridge. Riverbank erosion, driven by tributary sediment clogging the main channel, reduces channel capacity, redirects flow, and accelerates erosion, causing bridge foundation collapses, as seen with Xinyi, Shiba Stream, and Chenyoulan River Bridges during Typhoons Herb and Toraji. During Typhoon Morakot, erosion along the Shuili-Xinyi segment destroyed Shoushan Bridge and nearby slopes, with residences collapsing into the river. River meandering, such as Bishi Stream's redirection during Typhoon Toraji, severed the highway by cutting a straighter path into the Chenyoulan River.

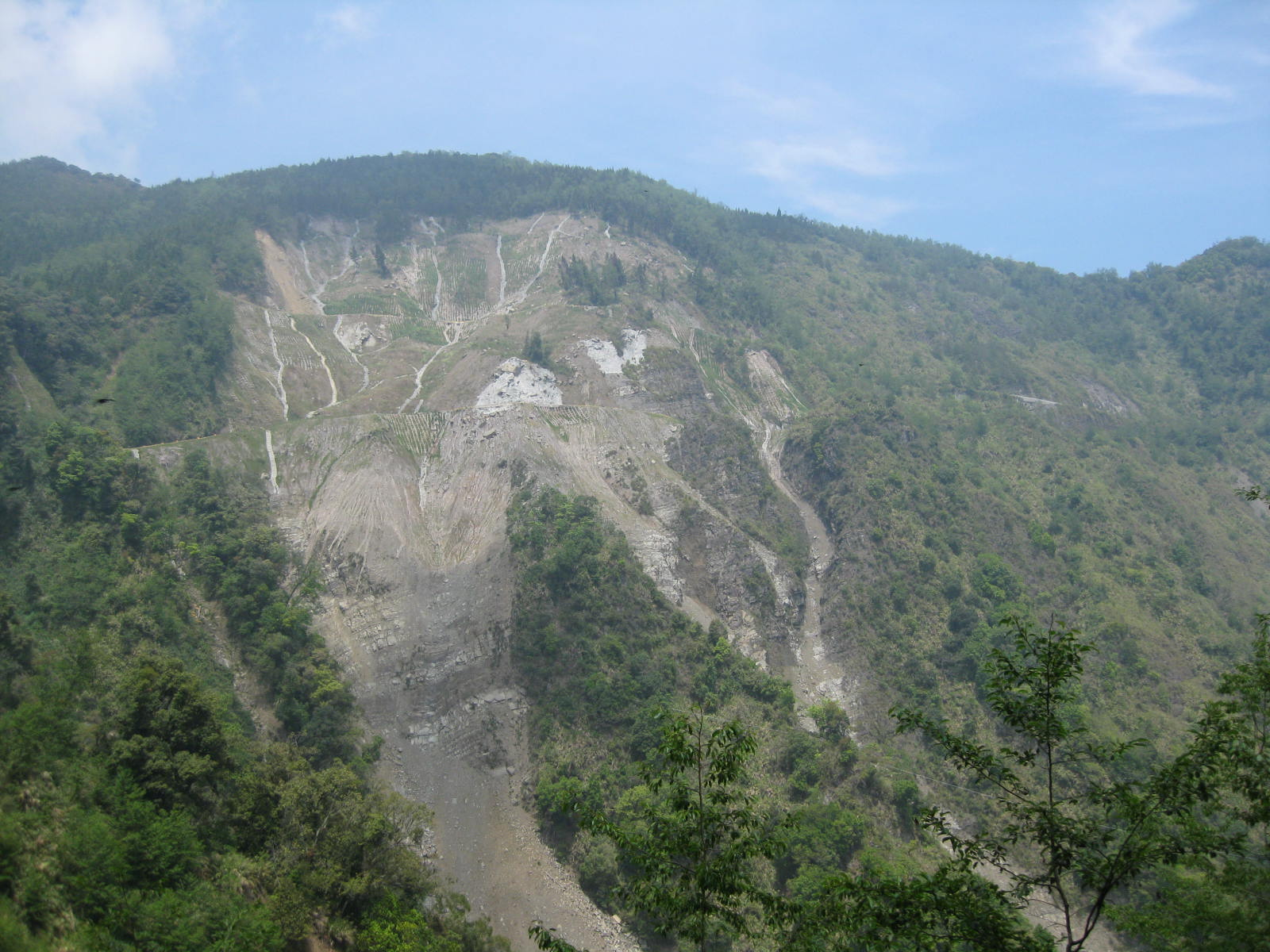
The "Great Hairpin Bend" on Taiwan Route 21, from Wuqian Stream Bridge to Dongpu Mountain, shows severe collapse.

On steep slopes (40–79 degrees), rockfall rates are low, but cliffs exceeding 80 degrees have a 100% occurrence rate, influenced by rock type, developed joints, faults, and discontinuity spacing. Blasting during highway construction destabilized layers, leaving blast holes and fractures, with rockfalls more frequent during typhoon-induced rains than in dry seasons. Sections like Xingaokou, Shishan, and Tatajia, near ridges, experience minor debris falls, while other segments are prone to rockfalls. Geographer Wang Xin studied the highway's slope stability before, during, and after construction, finding the Great Hairpin Bend most susceptible to collapses, primarily rockslides and debris slides. South of Shenmu Village, newly built sections exposed rock layers to weathering and erosion, exacerbated by anticlines, faults, and the Nanzhuang Formation's sandstone-shale layers, prone to differential erosion. These factors converge at the Great Hairpin Bend, notably at Wuqian Stream Valley, Dayong Bridge Valley, and Dongpu Tunnel. During Typhoon Morakot, the Wuqian Stream Bridge was destroyed, with 52 meters of roadbed eroded. The Directorate General of Highways stacked over 50 containers filled with debris as a temporary roadbed, restoring access in 20 days. The Wuqian Stream Valley's cirque-like collapse zone and faulted, fractured rock layers, eroded by heavy rain, supply debris for mudflows.

=== Yuli-Yushan Line ===
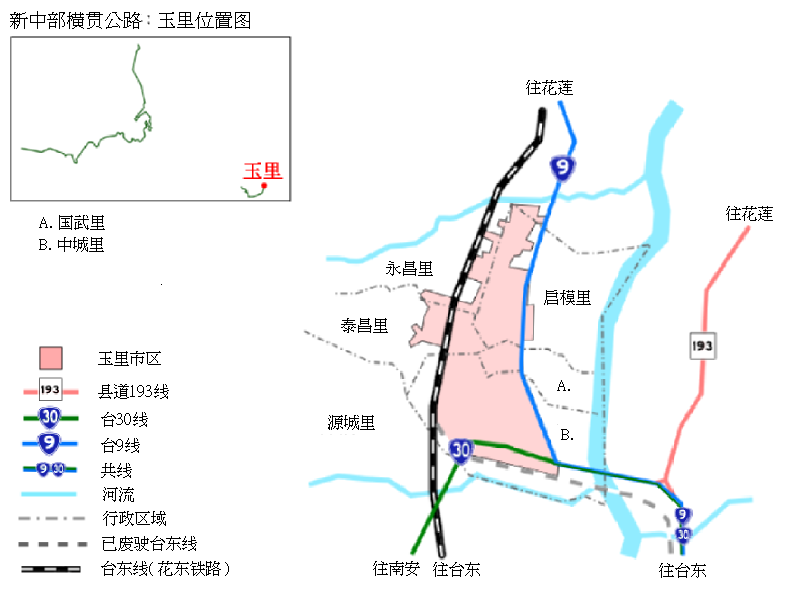
The Yuli-Yushan Line, or Yuli-Yushan Section, was planned to extend from Dongpu Mountain Pass westward to Yuli's town center in Hualien. (Note: The endpoint of the Yuli–Yushan Line, Yuli, refers to the central street of Yuli Township, which lies between Provincial Highway 9 and the Taitung Line railway. To the north, the Zhuoxi River flows from west to east, while to the south, the old Taitung railway crosses through. The administrative region consists of five li (neighborhoods): Zhongcheng, Guowu, Qimo, Taichang, and Yongchang. On maps, "Yuli" is marked as the name for the township's central street. According to the Yuli Township Gazetteer, which cites the Yuli Village Overview, in addition to the original five li, Yuancheng Li is also considered part of the central settlement area of Yuli Township. As shown in the figure below:) Initially planned at 102.7 km (7.1 km of existing roads upgraded, 95.6 km newly built), it was later revised to 122 km (7.2 km upgraded, 114.8 km newly built). The route spanned Xinyi Township, Nantou; Taoyuan District, Kaohsiung; (Note: To align with the administrative reorganization on December 25, 2010, the former Taoyuan Township of Kaohsiung County was restructured into Taoyuan District of Kaohsiung City. Accordingly, references to "Kaohsiung County" or "Taoyuan Township, Kaohsiung County" in the cited literature only appear in sources published prior to 2010.) and Zhuoxi and Yuli Townships, Hualien. Planned to converge with the Chiayi-Yushan and Shuili-Yushan Lines at Dongpu Mountain Pass, construction halted after 14.6 km, leaving Dongpu Mountain Pass, now called Tatajia, as the junction of only the Chiayi-Yushan and Shuili-Yushan Lines. Initially part of Taiwan Route 18, the completed section was reassigned to Taiwan Route 30 with the Yuchang Highway. (Note: There are two versions of the 14.6-kilometre (9.1 mi) road section west of Yuli: one stating that it extends from Yuli to Shanfeng, and another from Yuli to Daxin. The endpoint of the Yuli–Yushan route lies between Shanfeng and Daxin; this is evident from maps where both Shanfeng and Daxin are marked. Notably, Shanfeng is located on the Walami Trail. Provincial Highway No. 30 was numbered according to the classification system established by the Directorate General of Highways, in which east–west routes are assigned even numbers.)

==== Plan overview ====
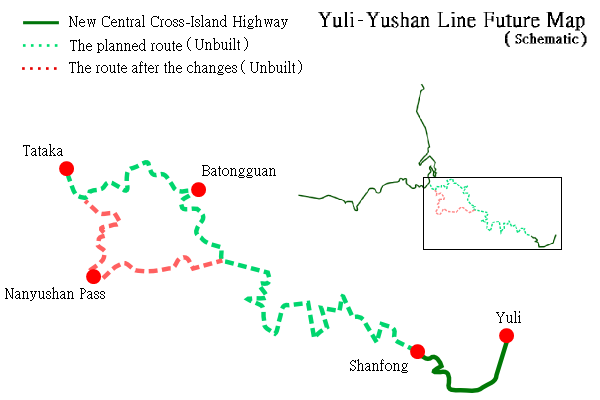
To comply with Yushan National Park, the red route shows a proposed rerouting of the Yuli-Yushan Line's 2K–78K section, avoiding Batongguan and passing through Nanyu Mountain Pass.

The original route started at the three-line junction, passing Tatajia Saddle and Shalixi Stream, navigating terrain to reach the highway's highest point at Batongguan (2,800 meters). It then turned southeast along Laonong River, with a planned tunnel near Dafenjian Mountain to cross the Central Mountain Range, marking the Nantou-Hualien boundary. After crossing, the route followed Lakulaku River, with planned tunnels and bridges to navigate terrain challenges, partly along the Batongguan Historic Trail, (Note: Since the Batongguan Historic Trail was constructed during different periods, there are distinctions between the Qing Dynasty and Japanese colonial eras. According to Yang Nanjun's research, the two historic trails intersect at only eleven points and do not overlap.) ending at Yuli with Taiwan Route 9.

Due to ecological concerns and Yushan National Park's establishment, the route was revised to avoid high-altitude areas. The Taiwan Provincial Highway Bureau rerouted from Dafen to Tatajia Saddle, upgrading the Nanzixi River forest road from Nanyu Mountain Pass to Tatajia Saddle and building a new section from Nanyu Mountain Pass to Dafen via Andongkun Mountain, crossing Laonong River. The National Land Management Agency suggested extending along Nanzixi River to the Southern Cross-Island Highway, but the Highway Bureau deemed it too circuitous. An environmental impact assessment led the Executive Yuan to halt the project, stopping construction at 14.6 km.

==== Geography ====
Before abandonment, the Yuli-Yushan Line was planned to cross the Dongpu Mountain Block to Tatajia Saddle. It followed Lakulaku Stream eastward to Zhuole, where Qingshui River joins, forming an alluvial fan (165-meter apex, 6,000-meter radius, 17 km^{2}) due to downstream sediment. The route ascends a steep-sided valley. Geologically, it followed the Batongguan Historic Trail through the Dananao Schist, (Note: The Geological Survey and Interpretation Planning Report on the Ancient Trails of Yushan National Park refers to the Dananao schist as the "Dananao Metamorphic Basement Geological Zone".) divided into the Tailuge Formation and Yuli Formation, comparable to the Central Cross-Island Highway's Tianxiang Formation, Changchun Formation, and Jiuju Marble. The route also crosses the Bilu Mountain Formation's slate belt between the Dananao Schist and alluvial layers. Yuli, at the Huadong Valley's center near the Central Mountain Range's base, is crossed by the Yuli Fault and lies at the confluence of Lakulaku, Xiuguluan, and Zhuoxi Streams, with alluvial deposits from Lakulaku and Qingshui Streams.

== Natural resources ==
Spanning Chiayi, Nantou, and Hualien, the New Central Cross-Island Highway aimed to leverage mountain resources for economic growth. (Note: According to the benefit evaluation conducted by the China Engineering Consultants, Inc., the ratio between the development benefits and transportation benefits of the New Central Cross-Island Highway is 9:1. The development benefits include five aspects: community development, geological research, tourism resource development, mineral resource development, and water resource development.) Surveys identified the Alishan Coalfield along the Chiayi-Yushan Line, with 600,000 tonnes of high-quality coal in the Nanzhuang Formation, fragmented by faults and folds, yielding up to 100,000 tonnes due to low mining efficiency. The Shuili-Yushan Line lacks significant resources, though nearby Dongpu Hot Springs indicate geothermal potential, deemed inefficient due to remoteness and low yield (less than 2% of Taiwan's power needs). The Yuli-Yushan Line, planned through Batongguan to Walami, holds the most resources, including crystalline limestone (marble), dolomite, quartz schist, and gold-bearing quartz veins. Walami's 5 billion tonnes of marble offer the greatest mining potential, though high-quality marble is limited. The Taiwan Power Company considered hydropower from Lakulaku and Chenyoulan Streams, primarily Lakulaku, but limited data restricts further assessment.

== Ecology ==
=== Flora ===
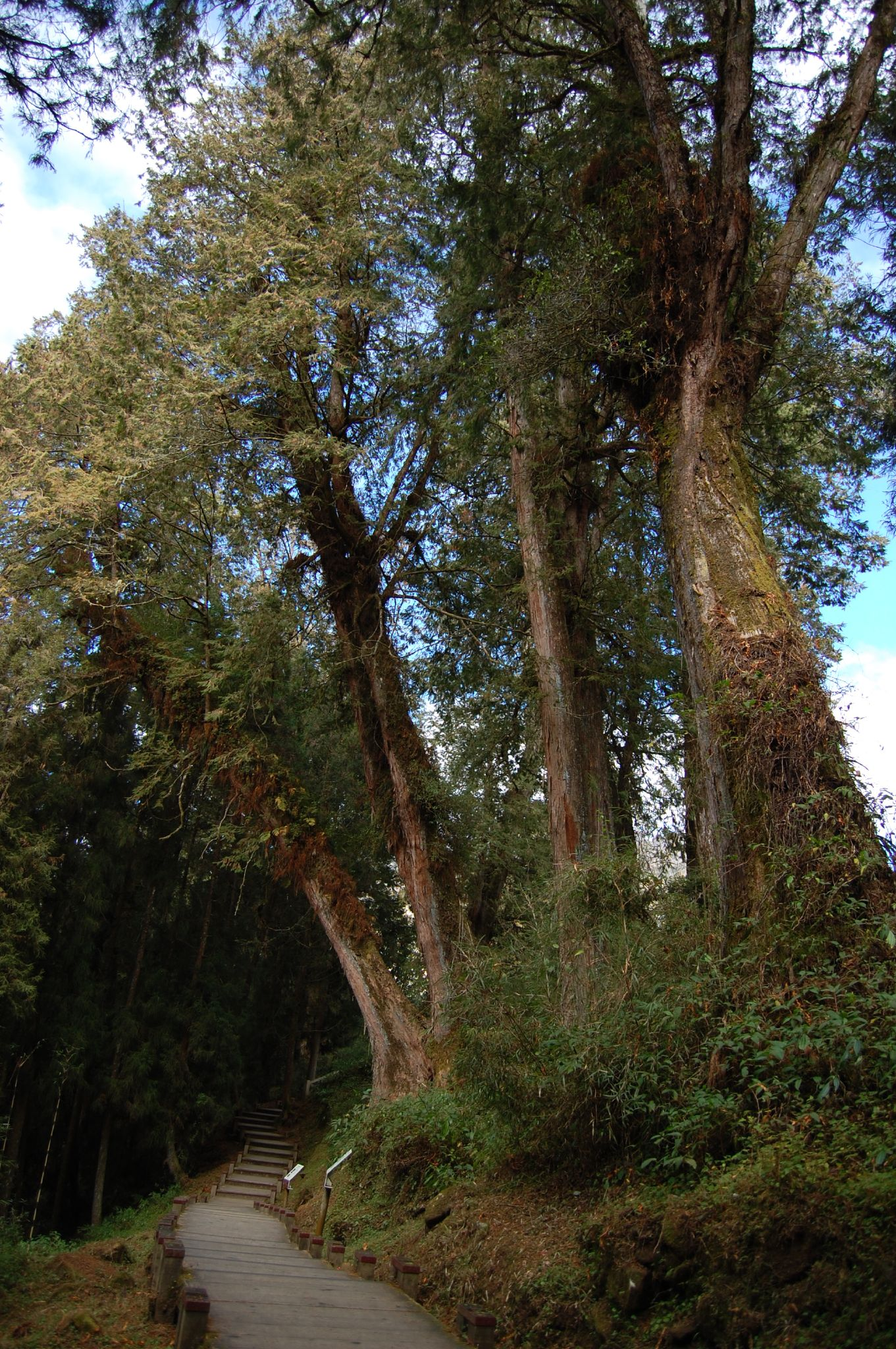
Taiwan red cypress, an indicator species of the fog forest belt, thrives in misty high-altitude areas like Alishan. (Note: Cloud forests (or fog forests) form as forest communities develop upward to the altitude of the cloud layer, where they become enveloped by clouds. They typically occur on the windward side in the zone of maximum precipitation, which makes the forest communities in this region relatively humid. According to page 184 of the Vegetation of Taiwan, as elevation increases, rainfall also increases until it reaches a limit at around 2,000 meters above sea level, forming cloud forests, which correspond to the cypress forest zone.)

From September 1987 to January 1988, professors Yang Shengren, Qiu Chuangyi, and Ye Qinglong from Pingtung Agricultural College (now National Pingtung University of Science and Technology) surveyed the highway's flora, identifying seven forest types by dominant and characteristic species, from low to high altitude: Miscanthus floridulus type, Artemisia-Japanese knotweed type, Taiwan red cypress type, Morrison's maple type, Formosan alder type, Taiwan pine type, and Formosan eupatorium type, widely distributed from lowlands to high mountains. At 350–1,300 meters, Miscanthus dominates with Hibiscus mutabilis, kudzu, and ramie, visible from Chukou to Alishan, replaced by Japanese cedar plantations above 1,400 meters. At 2,000–2,700 meters, Kusano's willow and Formosan alder grow with grasses like high mountain Miscanthus, Artemisia, Japanese knotweed, Aster ageratoides, ramie, Formosan eupatorium, Spiraea formosana, and Alishan mustard, with Artemisia and knotweed dominant on cliffs or collapse zones. The Rubus-cypress type (2,200–2,400 meters) overlaps with the Artemisia-knotweed type, a needle-broadleaf mix seen near Zizhong and Shuishan. Morrison's maple dominates at 2,300–2,600 meters near Zizhong to Dongpu Villa, with sparse forests including Kusano's willow, Evodia meliifolia, red cypress, Taiwan pine, Daphniphyllum oldhamii, Rubus, Quercus molii, and Lithocarpus konishii. At 2,400 meters, Formosan alder prevails with Kusano's willow, Symplocos theophrastifolia, and Lithocarpus longicaudatus, seen from Dongpu Villa to Xinyi and Shenmu Village. The Taiwan pine type (2,100–2,700 meters) includes Pinus armandii, Evodia, and Nothaphoebe konishii, forming high-altitude pine forests up to 3,000 meters. Thriving on sunny slopes, their resin-rich trunks are prone to fires, allowing Yushan cane and high mountain Miscanthus to grow, distinguished at 2,700 meters. Formosan eupatorium, spanning lowlands to over 3,000 meters, grows in unstable rock areas with Aster, Clematis tashiroi, Hydrangea integrifolia, ramie, Formosan alder, and Kusano's willow, forming low-coverage dwarf vegetation.

=== Fauna ===
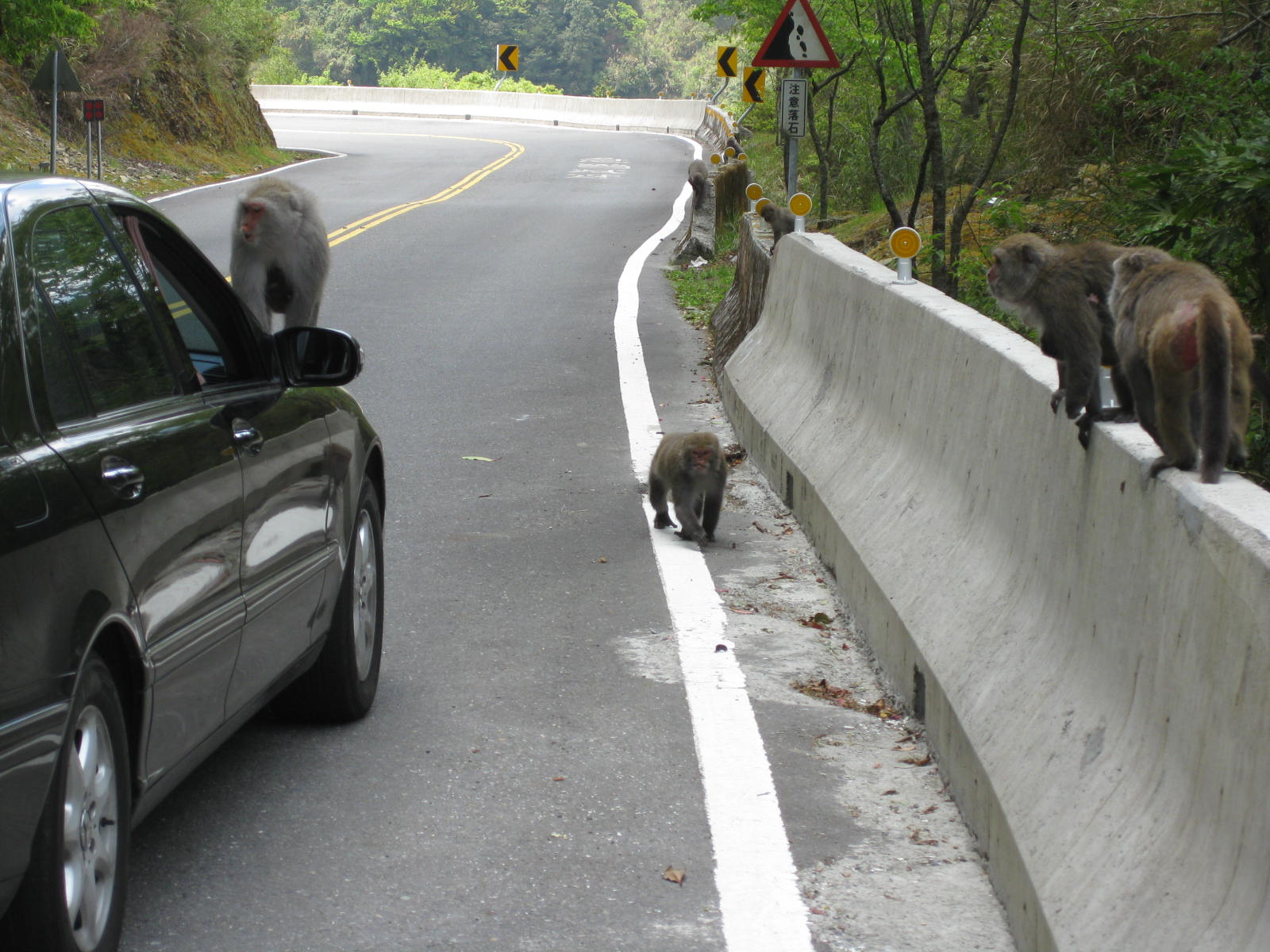
Formosan macaques, often overlapping with human activity, are commonly observed by drivers along the highway.

Crossing Taiwan's central high-altitude region, the highway traverses rich ecosystems with water sources and dense forests. The establishment of Yushan National Park (over 100,000 hectares), through which most of the highway passes, halted the Yuli-Yushan Line due to conservation concerns. The park's management commissioned ecological surveys, supplemented by nearby Tashan Major Wildlife Habitat, Lulinshan Major Wildlife Habitat, Nanzihsian River Wildlife Refuge, and Yuli Wildlife Refuge.

Formosan macaques maintain static behavior at over two meters from humans, but at less than one meter with frequent or aggressive interaction, they may rob food or attack, commonly seen at Shishan with rope bridges for safe crossing. Formosan black bears inhabit needle and broadleaf forests below 3,000 meters, primarily in Walami and Dafen, with sightings near Menglu Pavilion and Tatajia during quiet periods, indicating human activity's impact. Swinhoe's pheasant (Class II protected) and Formosan serow (Class III protected) avoid human disturbance, foraging along roads during low traffic or foggy conditions.

== Transportation network ==
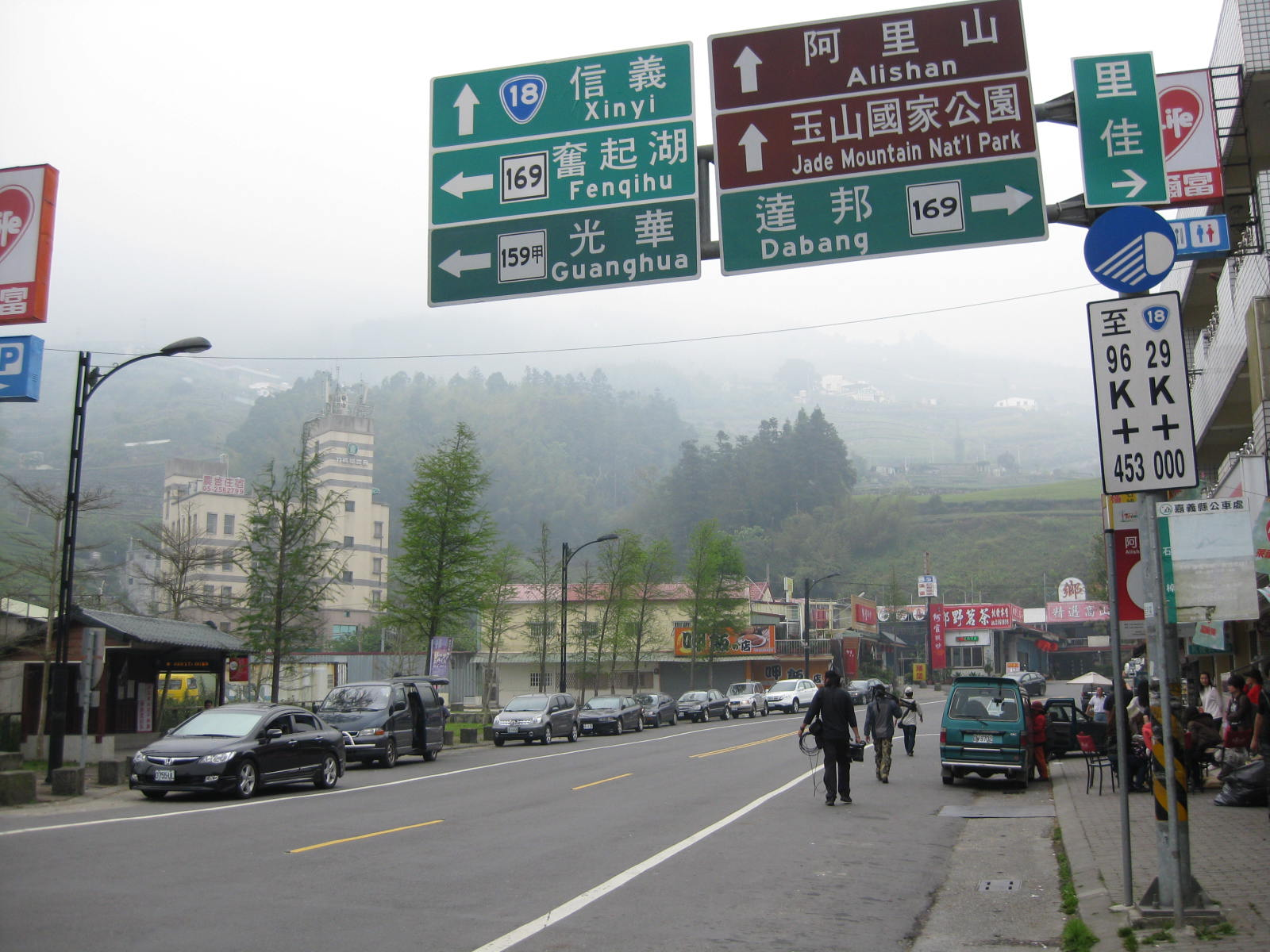
Shizhuo, a key hub on the Alishan Highway, connects to County Route 159A, a parallel alternative route below Shizhuo.

The New Central Cross-Island Highway comprises the Chiayi-Yushan, Shuili-Yushan, and Yuli-Yushan Lines. The unbuilt Tatajia to Shanfeng section isolates the Chiayi-Yushan and Shuili-Yushan Lines as a standalone system, while the Yuli-Yushan Line integrates with eastern Taiwan's network via Taiwan Route 30 with the Yuchang Highway. The Chiayi-Yushan Line is Taiwan Route 18, and the Shuili-Yushan Line is Taiwan Route 21, serving as the main route between Chiayi and Shuili.

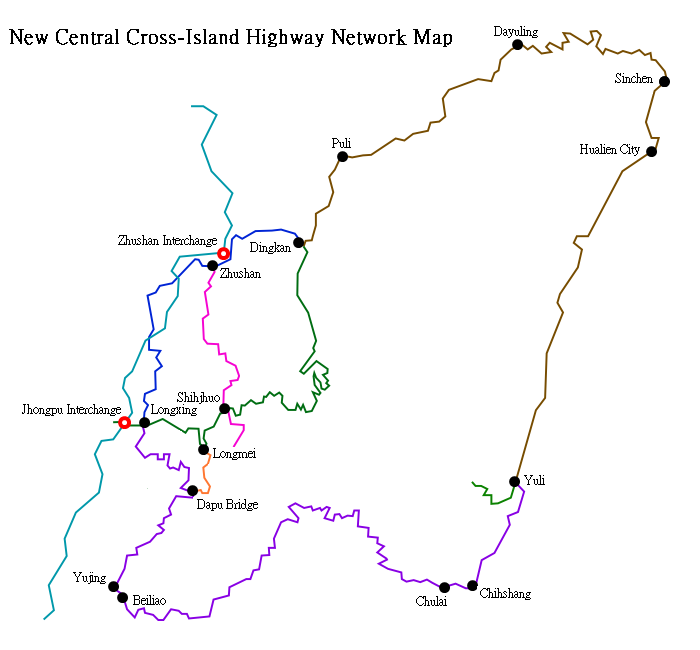
The highway's network with surrounding roads.

Taiwan Route 18 intersects County Route 165, National Freeway 3, Taiwan Route 3, County Route 169, and County Route 159A, connecting to Taiwan Route 21 at Tatajia. (Note: According to the Yushan National Park website, Tataka is the junction of Provincial Highways 18 and 21, and also the intersection point of the Chiayi–Yushan Line and Shuili–Yushan Line of the New Central Cross-Island Highway.) At Houzhuang, it branches north to Chiayi City or south to Baihe via County Route 165. Near Dingliu, National Freeway 3’s Zhongpu Interchange connects Chiayi to Shuili via Zhushan Interchange, Taiwan Route 3, and Taiwan Route 16, bypassing the highway's mountainous route. At Shizhuo, Taiwan Route 18, County Route 169, and County Route 159A converge, linking to Lijia, Yunlin, Nantou, and attractions like Alishan, Fenqihu, and Tefuye.

Taiwan Route 30, originally part of Taiwan Route 18, starts at the Walami Trailhead, intersecting Taiwan Route 9 at Yuli, running through the Huadong Valley or connecting to the Yuchang Highway at Antong to Ningpu via Taiwan Route 11. It is the only external road for Yushan National Park's eastern zone.

Taiwan Route 16 briefly shares Taiwan Route 21 at Dingkan, serving villages like Renhe, Dili, and Shuanglong to Shuili, Jiji, and Mingjian. Taiwan Route 21 connects Xinyi, Yuchi, and Puli, passing Sun Moon Lake and Yushan National Park. A 53 km interruption from Tatajia to Dakanuwali splits (Note: The section from 149.126K to 202.092K of Provincial Highway 21, approximately 53 kilometres (33 mi) in length, is currently interrupted, causing the highway to be split into two segments. At present, the route shown on maps ends at Tataka in the north and at Dakanowa in the south.) it into northern and southern segments, limiting north–south connectivity.

For transport efficiency, (Note: According to on-site surveys conducted by the reconnaissance team, the Wushe–Tongmen route has a total length of approximately 102 kilometres (63 mi): about 13 kilometres (8.1 mi) from Wushe to Lushan, around 20 kilometres (12 mi) from Tongmen to Longjian, and about 5 kilometres (3.1 mi) between Lushan and Tunyuan, which can be accessed by jeep. The remaining 64 kilometres (40 mi) would require new road construction. Since personnel from the Taiwan Power Company maintain parts of the route, the road conditions are generally good and passable on foot. The Shuili–Fenglin route, based on the reconnaissance team’s measurements, has a total length of approximately 110 kilometres (68 mi): about 30 kilometres (19 mi) along the Danda Forest Road from Miaopu to the Third Substation, and about 24 kilometres (15 mi) along the Wanrong Forest Road from Wanrong to Daguan, both of which could be widened and improved. The remaining 56 kilometres (35 mi) would need to be newly constructed. In terms of transport efficiency, the Shuili–Fenglin route is superior to the New Central Cross-Island Highway, as the required new road section is shorter, leading to lower construction costs. The estimated travel time is around five hours.) the Shuili-Fenglin Line was more cost-effective than the New Central Cross-Island Highway due to shorter new sections. (Note: The construction of the East–West Cross-Island Highway is essentially based on a route that runs in an east–west direction. Along the way, it crosses the Central Mountain Range and eventually connects the main arterial roads of the eastern and western regions, thereby living up to its name as a "cross-island" highway from east to west.) The highway lost its east–west traversal role, with the Central and Southern Cross-Island Highways serving Yuli to Shuili or Chiayi. From western Taiwan to Yuli, routes include a northern detour via Dingkan, Puli, Wushe, Dayuling, Taiwan Route 8, and Taiwan Route 9, or a southern detour via Alishan Highway to Longxing (Note: Longxing refers to Longxing Village, which is under the jurisdiction of Zhongpu Township, Chiayi County. According to the map, the intersection of Provincial Highway 3 and Provincial Highway 18 is marked with the place name "Shizi Road" ("Crossroad").) or Jiayi 129 Line (Note: Shixia Nei is a place name located within Dapu Township, Chiayi County. According to the map, this place is situated near the Dapu Arch Bridge. The intersection of County Road 129 (Jia 129) and Provincial Highway 3 (Tai 3) is shown on the map as being at the northern end of the Dapu Arch Bridge.) to Shixiangnei. Both routes connect to Taiwan Highway 3. Heading south along Highway 3, pass through Dapu and Yujing to Beiliao, where it connects to Highway 20. Then continue to Chulai, turn north across the Chulai Bridge, follow Highway 20A to Chishang, connect to Highway 9 heading north, and finally arrive at Yuli.

== Medical services ==
Since opening, the New Central Cross-Island Highway has been vital for mountain medical and rescue operations, serving remote townships like Xinyi and Alishan. Its winding, high-altitude roads increase travel time and risks, and limited local development results in scarce medical resources, complicating emergency responses.

At the Walami Trailhead in Yushan National Park's eastern zone, Taiwan Route 30 is 15 km from Yuli, (Note: Provincial Highway 30 starts at Shanfeng and reaches Yuli, where it connects with Provincial Highway 9. This road section is 15.026 kilometres (9.337 mi) long and spans Zhuoxi Township and Yuli Town. It constitutes the remaining segment of the Yuli–Yushan section of the New Central Cross-Island Highway.) home to Tzu Chi Hospital, Yuli Veterans Hospital, and Ministry of Health and Welfare Yuli Hospital. The Xianglin Joint Clinic in Alishan National Forest Recreation Area serves Zhongzheng, Zhongshan, and Xianglin, (Note: According to page 195 of The Alishan Township Gazetteer, in terms of administrative divisions, the Alishan Forest Recreation Area is distributed among the three villages of Zhongzheng, Zhongshan, and Xianglin.) handling tourist emergencies with adequate equipment but no resident EMT. It is staffed by nurses and weekend doctors, with a helipad for evacuations. The Alishan Medical Station at Shizhuo, staffed daily by doctors from St. Martin De Porres Hospital, addresses local medical shortages but lacks advanced emergency resources, relying on helicopter evacuations.

As a lifeline, the highway's remoteness means ambulance trips from Tatajia or Alishan to hospitals like Chang Gung Medical Foundation, St. Martin De Porres, Taichung Veterans General Hospital Chiayi Branch, or Chiayi Christian Hospital (90 minutes from Alishan) or Zhushan Show Chwan Hospital (2 hours from Tatajia) are time-intensive. Alishan's robust EMS responds in 5–10 minutes, while Tatajia requires at least 20 minutes from Alishan, posing challenges for emergency response.

== Tourism ==
=== Natural attractions ===
Taiwan Route 18, commonly known as the Alishan Highway, ascends from Chiayi to Alishan, traversing four forest belts—tropical, warm, temperate, and cold—due to elevation changes. (Note: "Hot, warm, mild, and cold" refer to the fact that the forest climate in this area corresponds to climates at different latitudes; this phenomenon is caused by changes in elevation.) Frequent afternoon fog envelops the Alishan cypress groves, (Note: See Note 15.) earning them the designation of a fog forest belt. The route is home to numerous giant trees, revered as sacred, including over 30 along Alishan's boardwalk, as well as the Shuiku Sacred Tree, Lulin Sacred Tree, Upper Dongpu Great Hemlock, and Wannian Sacred Tree at Shenmu Village. The highway also offers stunning natural vistas, including sunrises, cloud seas, and sunsets, with Duigaoyue and Zhushan as renowned viewing spots.

At Tatajia, Yushan National Park features a recreation area surrounded by peaks such as Dongpu Mountain, Lulin Mountain, Lulin Front Mountain, and Linzhi Mountain. The junction of Taiwan Route 18 and Taiwan Route 21 forms the Dongpu Mountain Pass, a saddle between Dongpu and Lulin Mountains. The Yushan National Park Administration has designated the segment from Taiwan Route 18's 105.2K to Taiwan Route 21's 119.5K as a scenic highway, marked by the park's boundary monument. Attractions along this route include Guanshan, Guanfeng, and the Couple Trees, with autumn showcasing the vibrant, changing foliage of Morrison's maple and falling leaves.

On Taiwan Route 30, the Nan'an waterfall, located close to the highway, (Note: The Nan'an Waterfall can be seen from the Zhuo’an Bridge on Provincial Highway 30. Its location is identifiable on the map. Compared to the waterfalls along the Chiayi–Yushan section, Nanan Waterfall is the closest to the New Central Cross-Island Highway.) is just a 2-km drive from the Nanan Visitor Center, making it a highlight of the Nan'an Recreation Area. Waterfalls along Taiwan Route 18, such as Lover's Waterfall, Xianjing Waterfall, Brothers Waterfall, and Wanzhang Waterfall, are deeper in the mountains, while those on Taiwan Route 21, including Rainbow Waterfall, Yinu Waterfall, and Yunlong Waterfall near Dongpu, require detours via County Route 60 to Dongpu, followed by trail access. The Dongpu Hot Spring area connects to the highway via County Route 60, linking to external transport and forming a key tourism route, with the nearby Lele Valley Hot Spring as an additional attraction.

=== Cultural attractions ===
The Batongguan Historic Trail, now a hiking route maintained by the Yushan National Park Administration, was completed by Japanese authorities in 1921. A monument commemorating the trail's construction stands in front of the Nanan Visitor Center, with the trail's eastern section partially designated as the Walami Trail. (Note: The New Central Cross-Island Highway passes through Yushan National Park. Within the park, there are hiking trails available to visitors at Tataga and Walami. Due to mountain entry restrictions, the sections of the road east of the Tatajia Saddle and west of Jiaxin cannot be accessed without applying for a mountain entry permit-) The Walami Trailhead connects to Taiwan Route 30, a remnant of the stalled Yuli-Yushan Line. Other trails, such as Shuishan, Fushan, and Bashana Taosheng, are accessible by foot from Taiwan Route 18.

The “Xingaokou” (New High Mouth), the historical Japanese-era climbing entrance to New High Mountain (now Yu Shan), is located at the Tatajia Saddle. A stone monument marking the “New High Climbing Entrance” stands in Dingkan Village's Zhentou Lane, the Japanese-era gateway to New High Alishan, designated by the Taiwan Governor-General's Office as a national park candidate site. The Tatajia Visitor Center, situated at the planned junction of the New Central Cross-Island Highway's three lines, now serves as the intersection of Taiwan Route 18 and Taiwan Route 21, where the Yuli-Yushan Line's construction was halted.

Temple attractions along Taiwan Route 18 include Wufeng Temple, Longyin Temple, Ciyun Temple, and Shouzheng Palace. Wufeng Temple, dedicated to Wu Feng Gong, has locations at Shekou and Shizhuo, with the Shekou temple, the oldest, listed as a county-level historic site (Level 3). Longyin Temple, built in 1980 at Chukou Village, Fanlu Township, along Taiwan Route 18, is the newest, dedicated to Master Jigong. Nearby, the Tianchang and Dijiu Suspension Bridges, collectively called “Tianchang Dijiu” (Everlasting), are located near Longyin Temple. The Dijiu Bridge spans Bazhang Stream, parallel to the Chukou Bridge on Taiwan Route 18. Before the Alishan Highway's construction, these bridges were the primary access route for residents traveling between Gongtian and Chukou.

Following the Alishan Highway's completion, tea cultivation flourished along the route, reaching saturation in the 1990s. Below Shizhuo, the landscape is dominated by tea gardens. Along Taiwan Route 21 in Shuili and Xinyi, attractions include the Shuili Snake Kiln, Caopingtou Tourism Tea Garden, and fruit orchards in Shang’an and Fengqiu, alongside wineries and factories for green plums, a local agricultural specialty. During plum blossom season, visitors can witness blooming plum trees in areas like Fengguidou and Wusonglun.

== See also ==
- New Central Cross-Island Highway – Chiayi to Yushan section: Alishan Highway (Provincial Highway 18)
- New Central Cross-Island Highway – Shuili to Yushan section: Third Inland North–South Highway (Provincial Highway 21)
- Highway system in Taiwan
- Provincial Highway 7, the Northern Cross-Island Highway
- Provincial Highway 8, the Central Cross-Island Highway
  - Provincial Highway 14
- Provincial Highway 20, the Southern Cross-Island Highway
