= Central Highway =

Central Highway may refer to:

- Central Highway (Cuba).
- Central Cross-Island Highway in New Zealand.
- Central Highway, stage in Mega Man Maverick Hunter X.
- New Central Cross-Island Highway in Taiwan.

== See also ==
- Autopista Central, Chile
