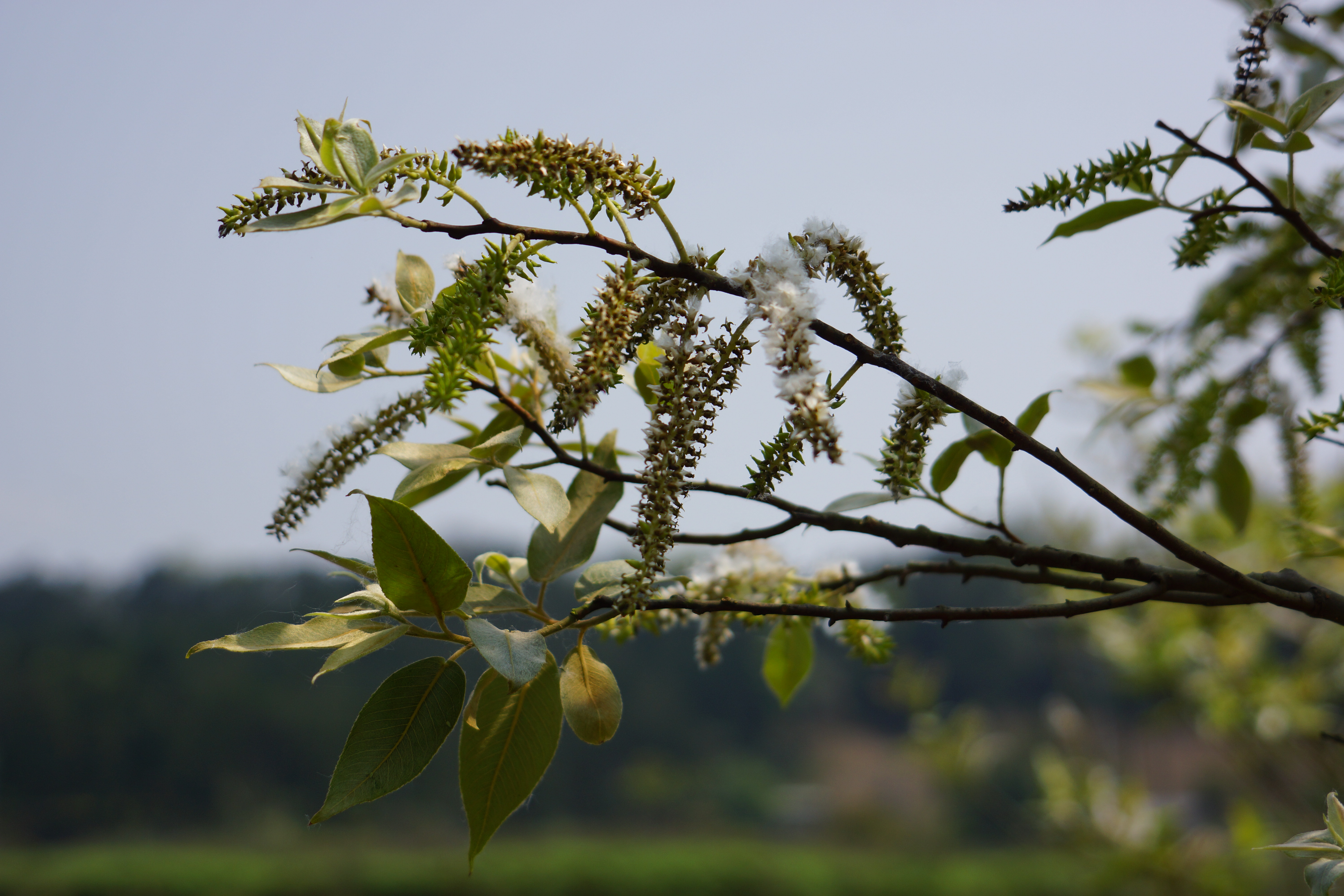

Conservation status
- Endangered (IUCN 2.3)

Scientific classification
- Kingdom: Plantae
- Clade: Tracheophytes
- Clade: Angiosperms
- Clade: Eudicots
- Clade: Rosids
- Order: Malpighiales
- Family: Salicaceae
- Genus: Salix
- Species: S. kusanoi

Binomial name
- Salix kusanoi (Hayata) Schneider

= Salix kusanoi =

Species of willow

Salix kusanoi is a species of willow in the family Salicaceae. It is endemic to Taiwan. It is threatened by habitat loss.

It is a deciduous tree growing to 7 m (23 ft) tall. The leaves are alternate, 9 cm long and 4 cm broad, with finely serrated edge and glands. Both sides of the leaves are green and have dark orange fine hairs. The hairs on the underside of the leaves are more obvious, and the hairs can be easily wiped off. The flowers are produced in early spring before the new leaves appear. It is dioecious, with male and female catkins on separate plants. The male catkins are 8–9 cm long; the female catkins are 3 cm long.

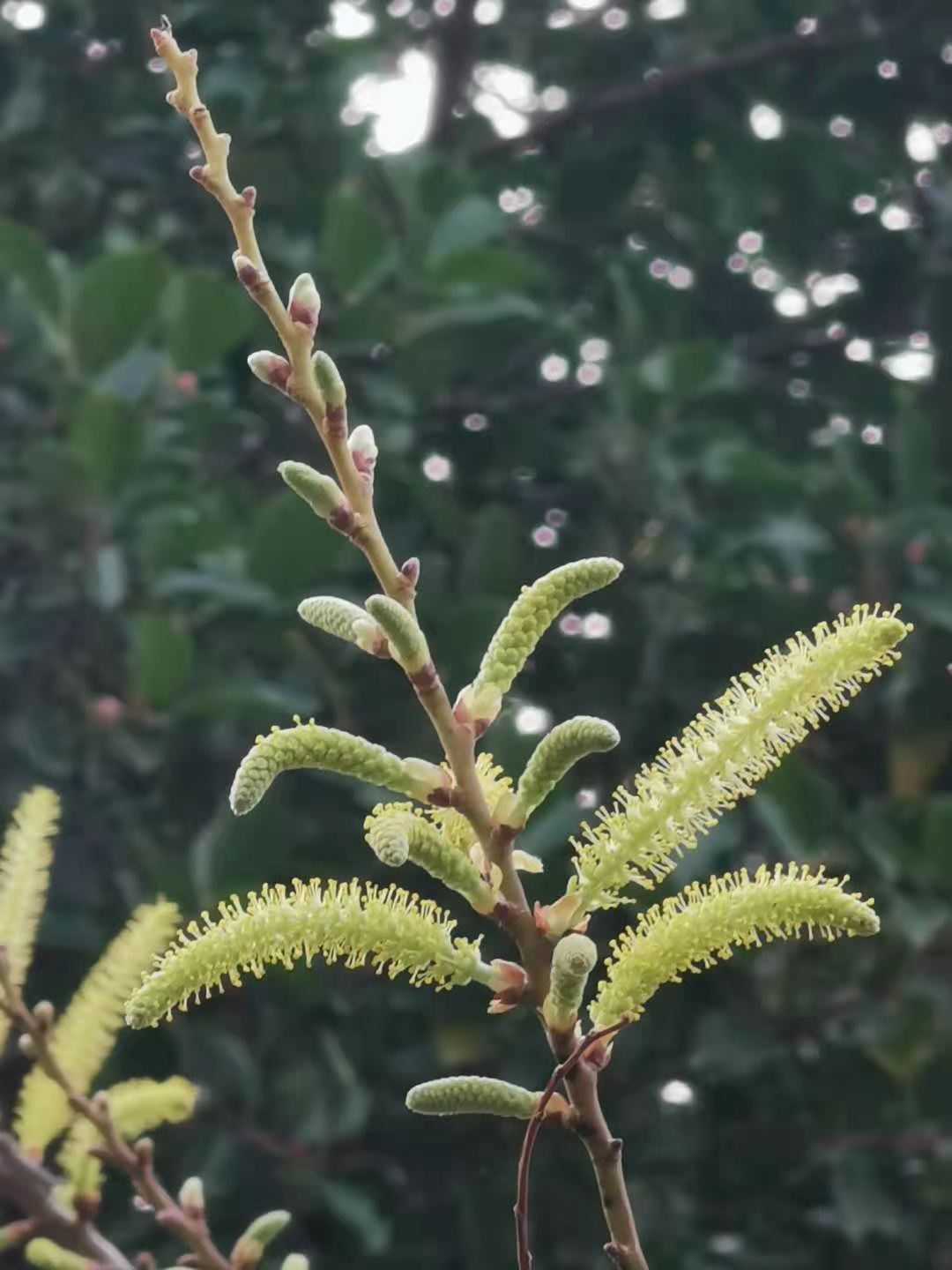
Male catkins with golden yellow flowers

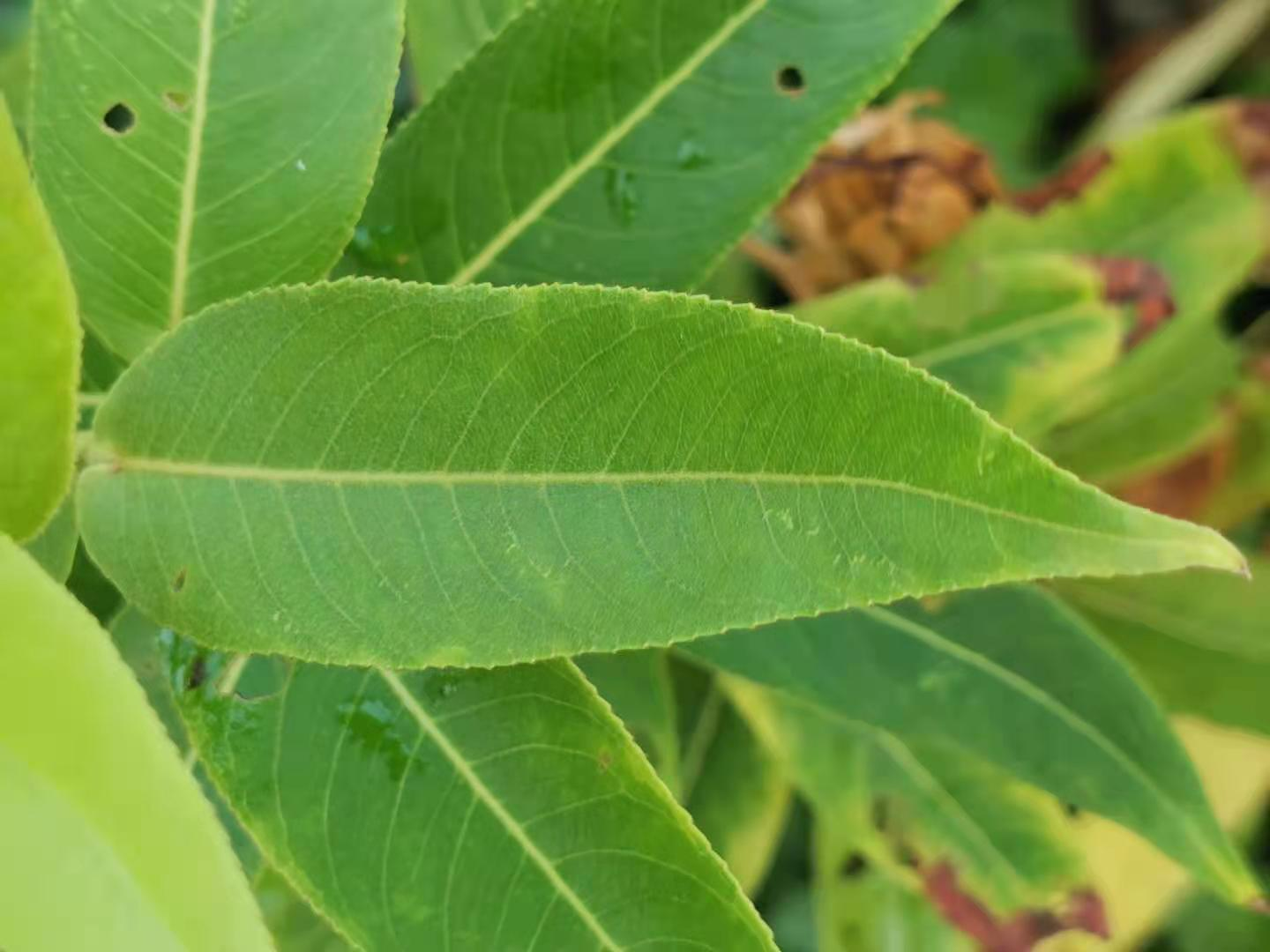
Leaf. Leaf bases are often heart-shaped.

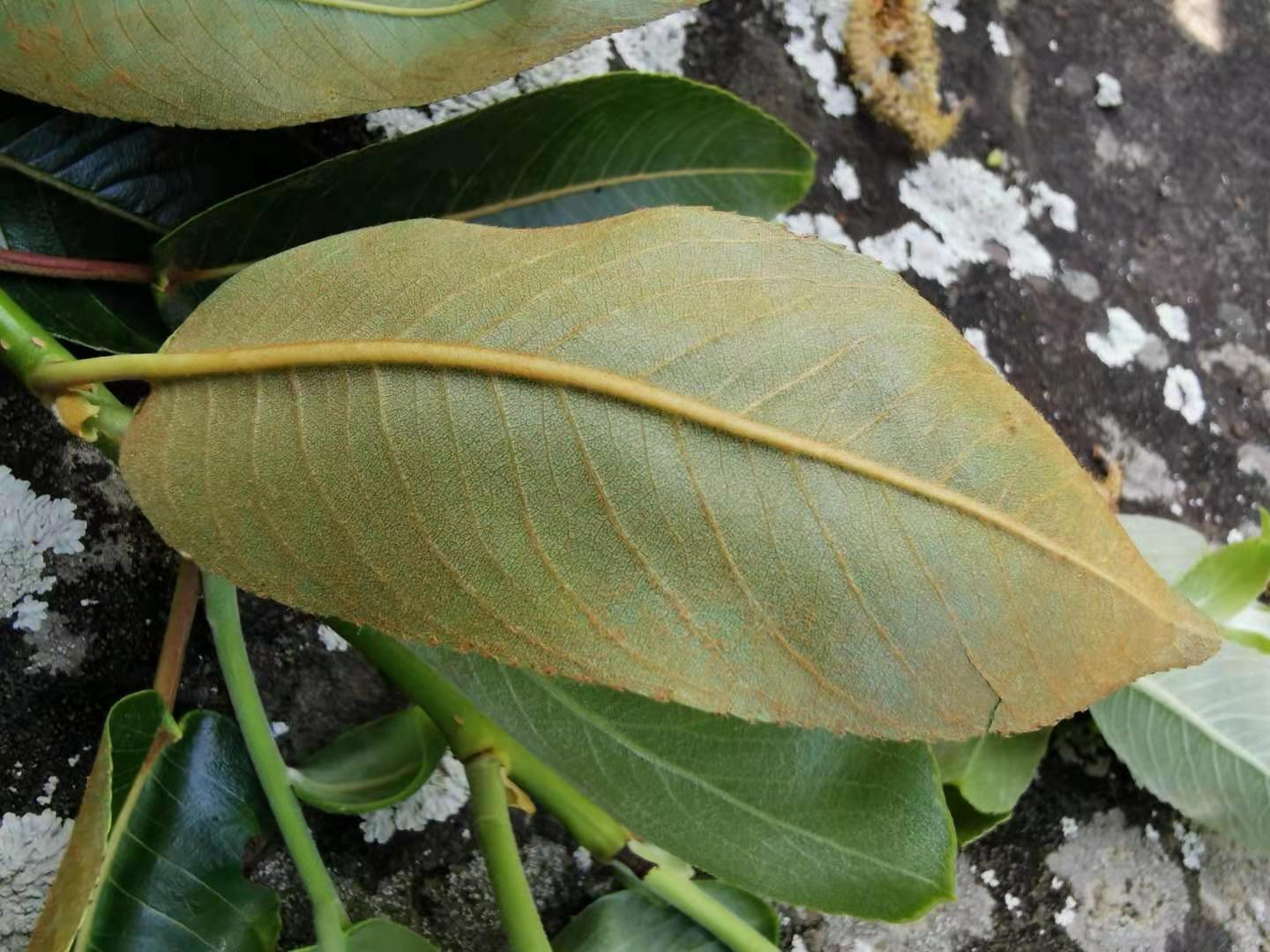
The fine hairs on the leaves

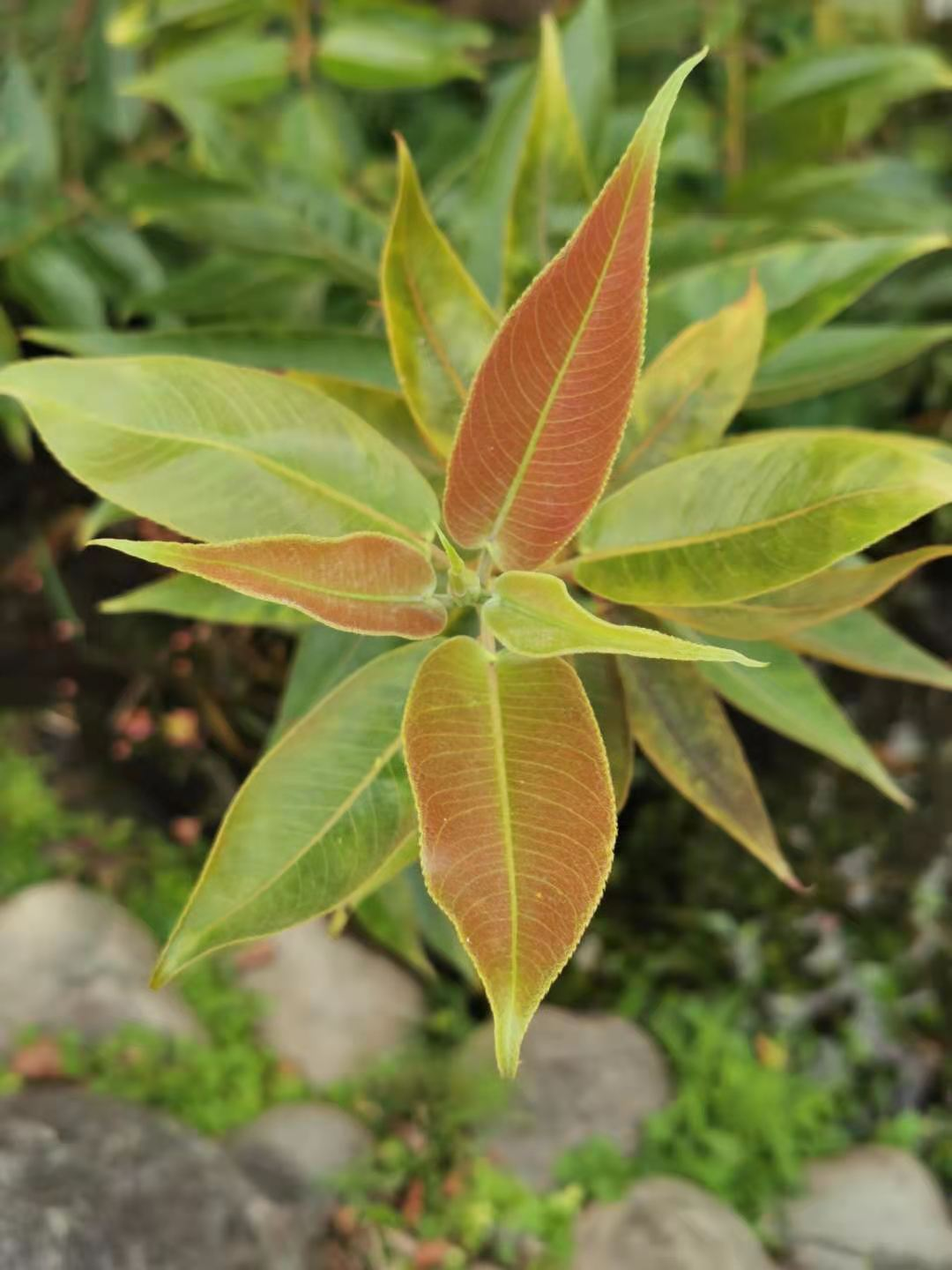
Young leaves

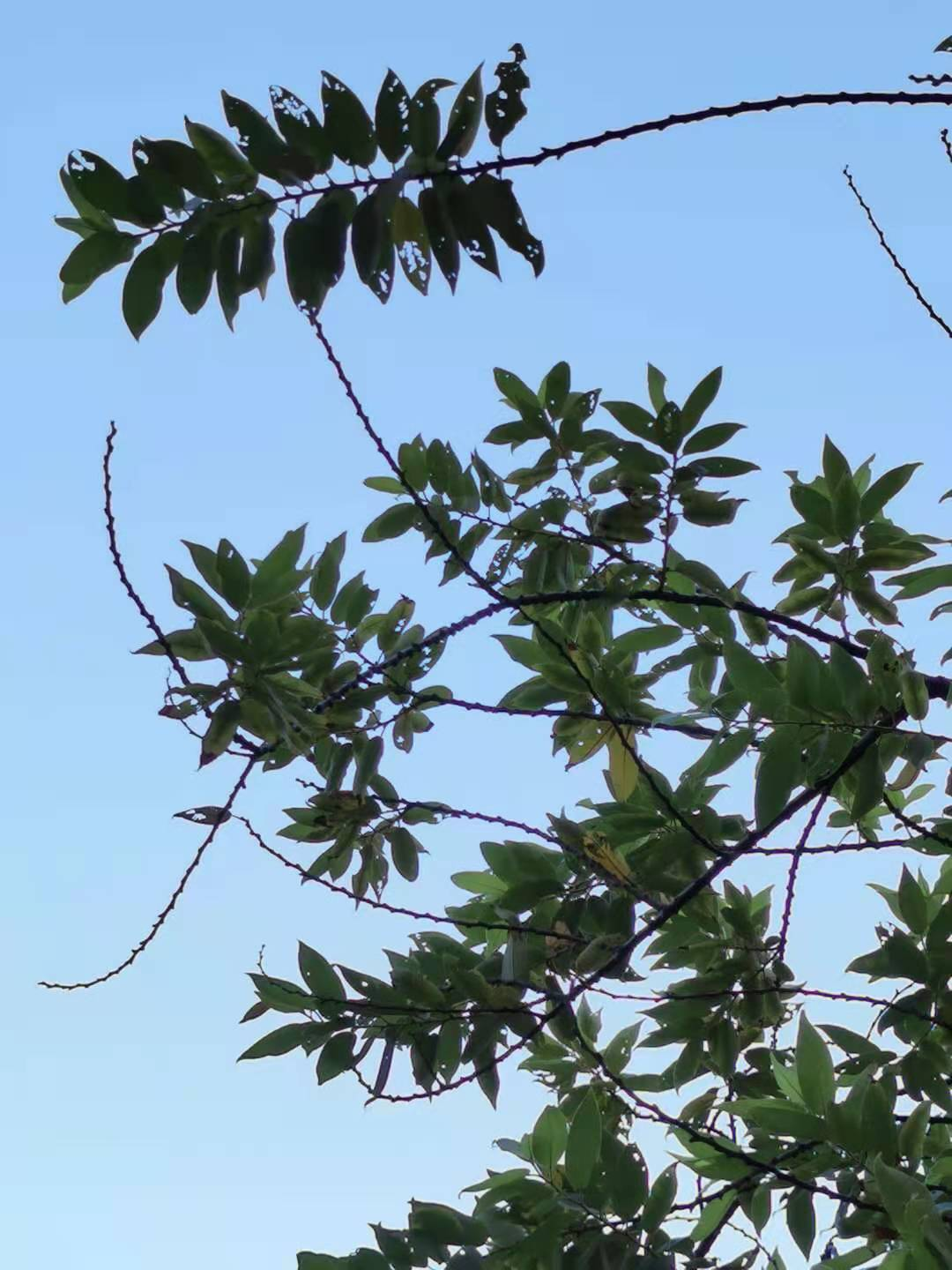
Branches and leaves

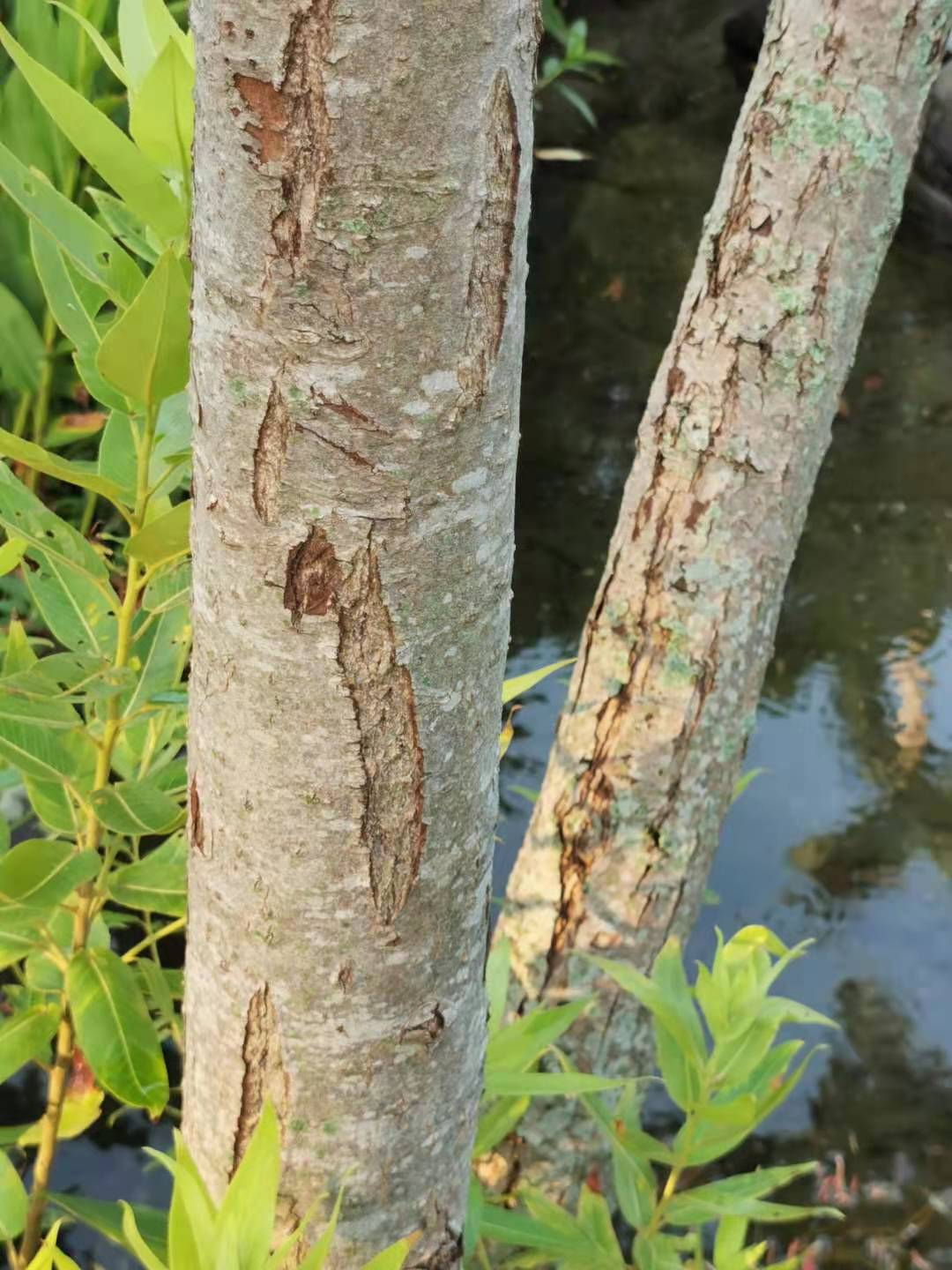
Bark of a young plant

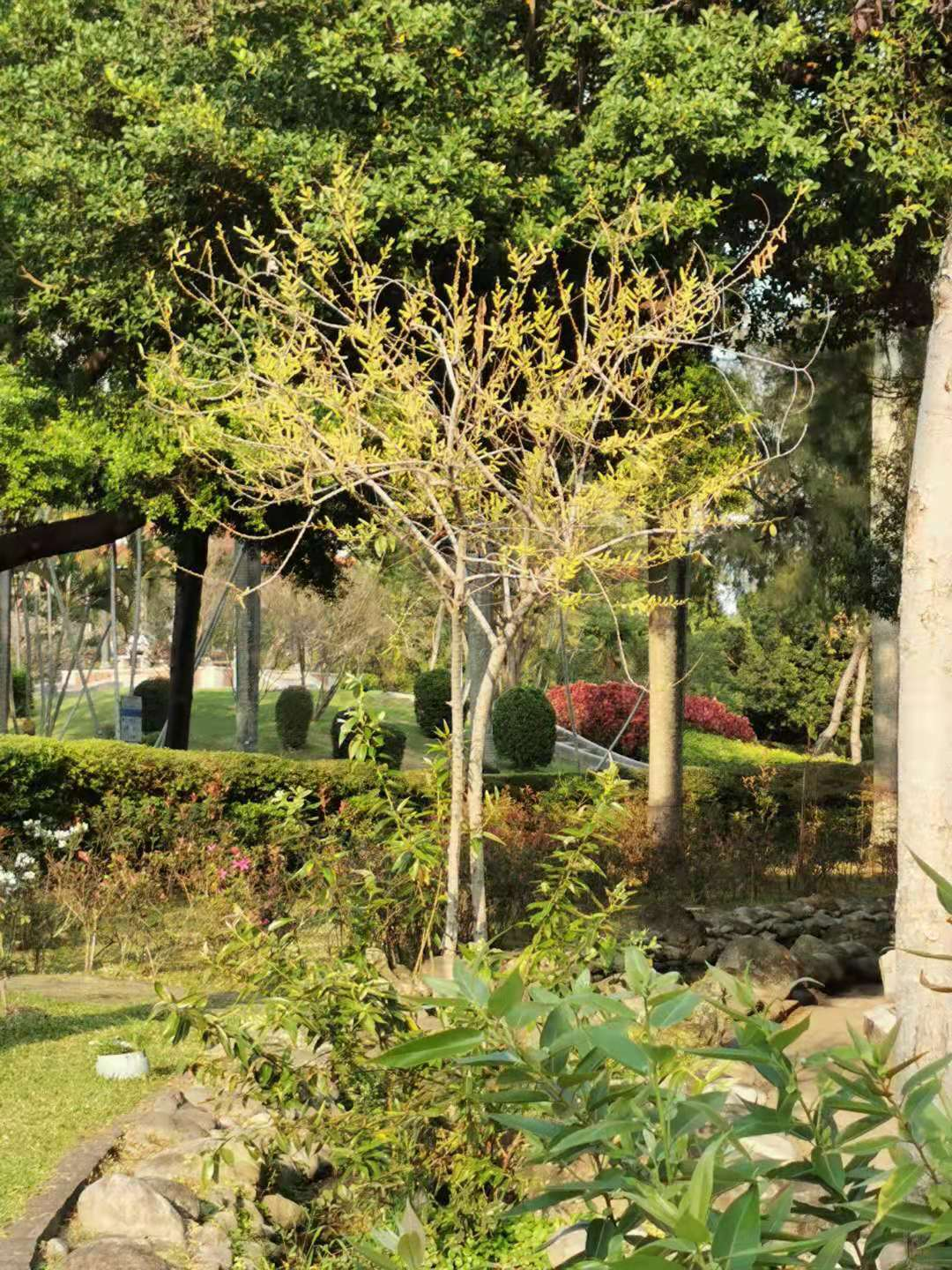
Young plant with male flowers
