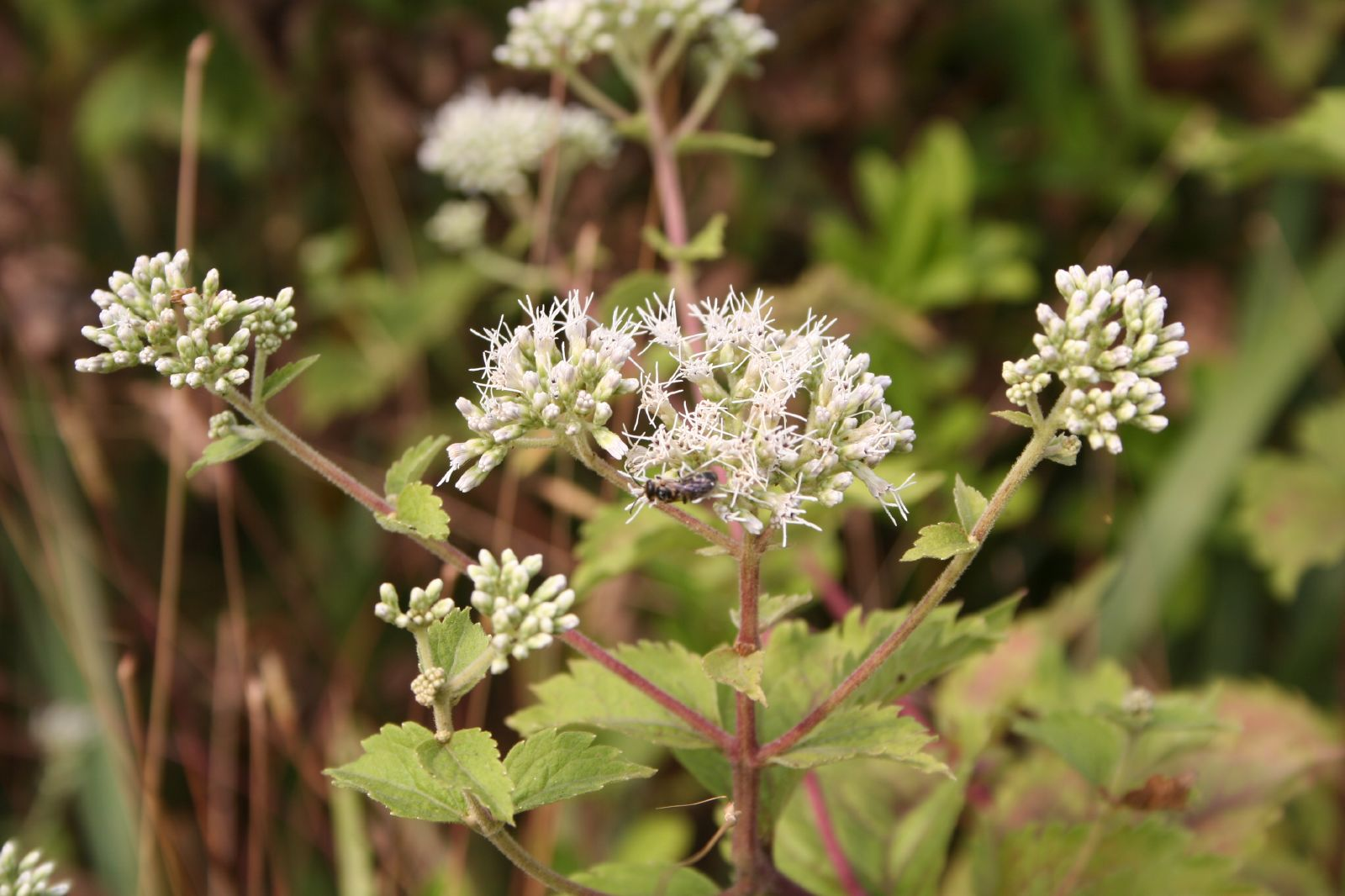

Scientific classification
- Kingdom: Plantae
- Clade: Tracheophytes
- Clade: Angiosperms
- Clade: Eudicots
- Clade: Asterids
- Order: Asterales
- Family: Asteraceae
- Genus: Eupatorium
- Species: E. formosanum

Binomial name
- Eupatorium formosanum Hayata

= Eupatorium formosanum =

Species of flowering plant

Eupatorium formosanum is a plant species in the family Asteraceae. It is found in Taiwan and the Ryukyu Islands of Japan. It is a perennial herb growing to approximately 2 m (7 ft) in height.

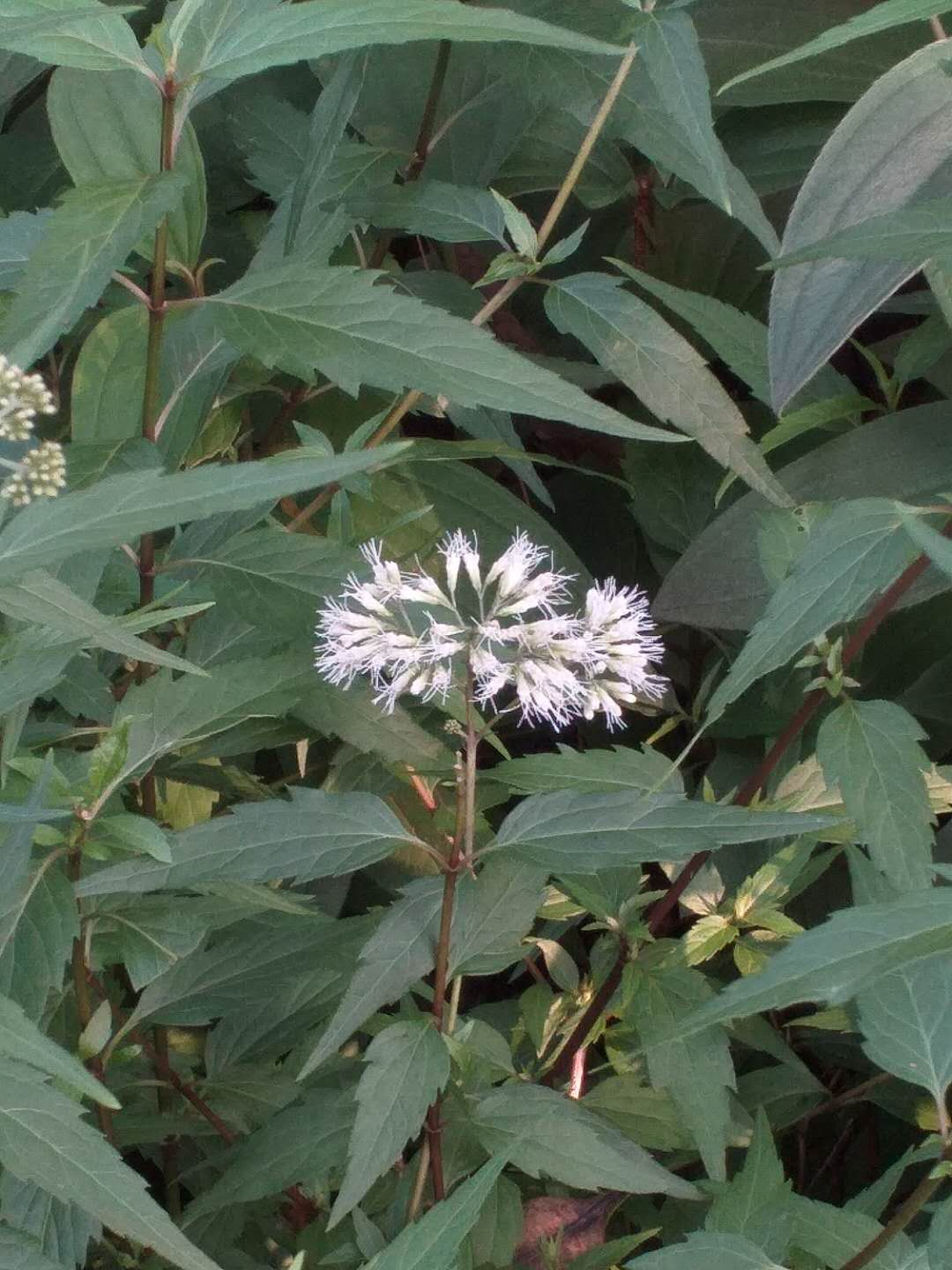
Inflorescence and leaves

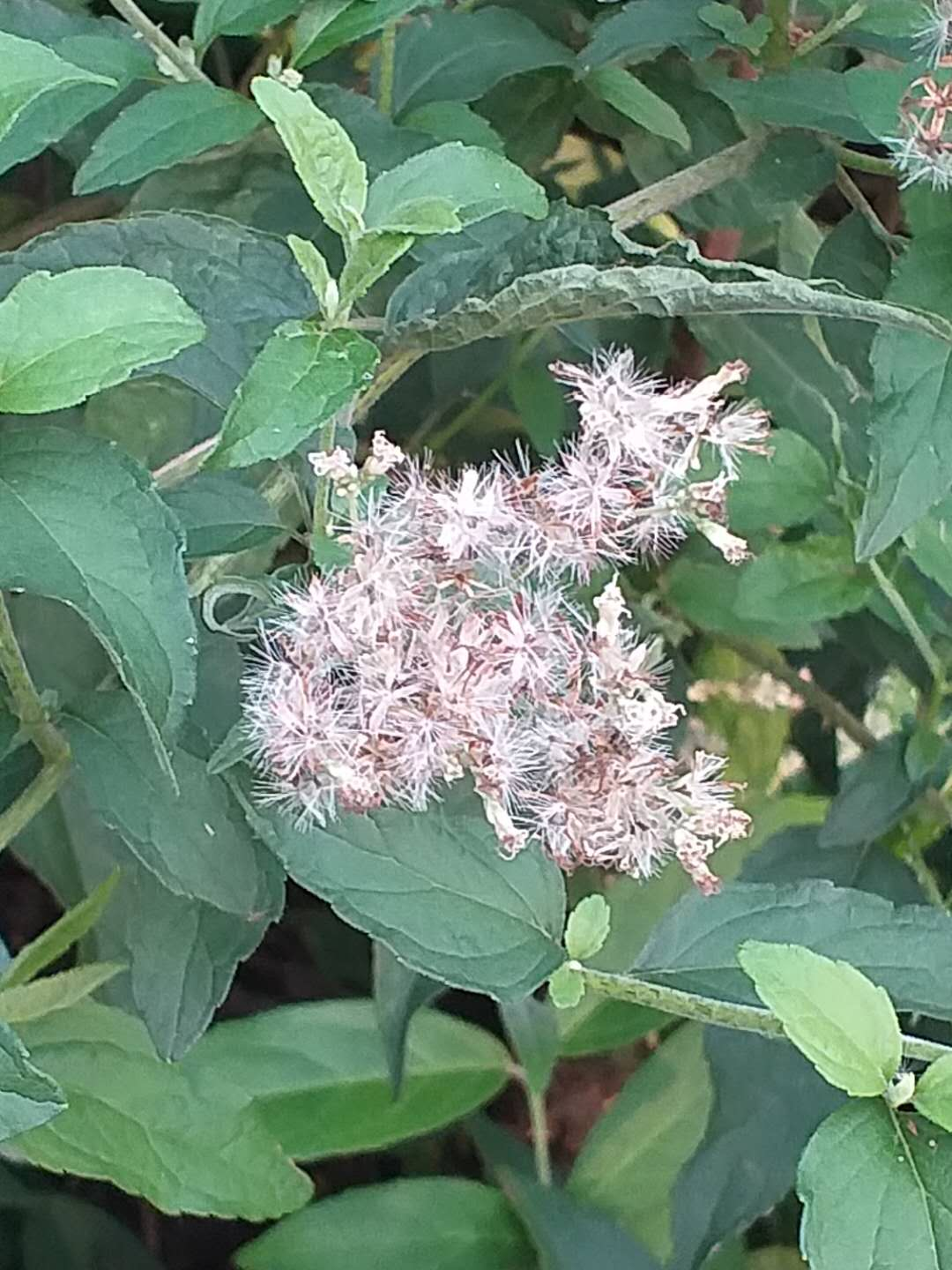
Pappus
