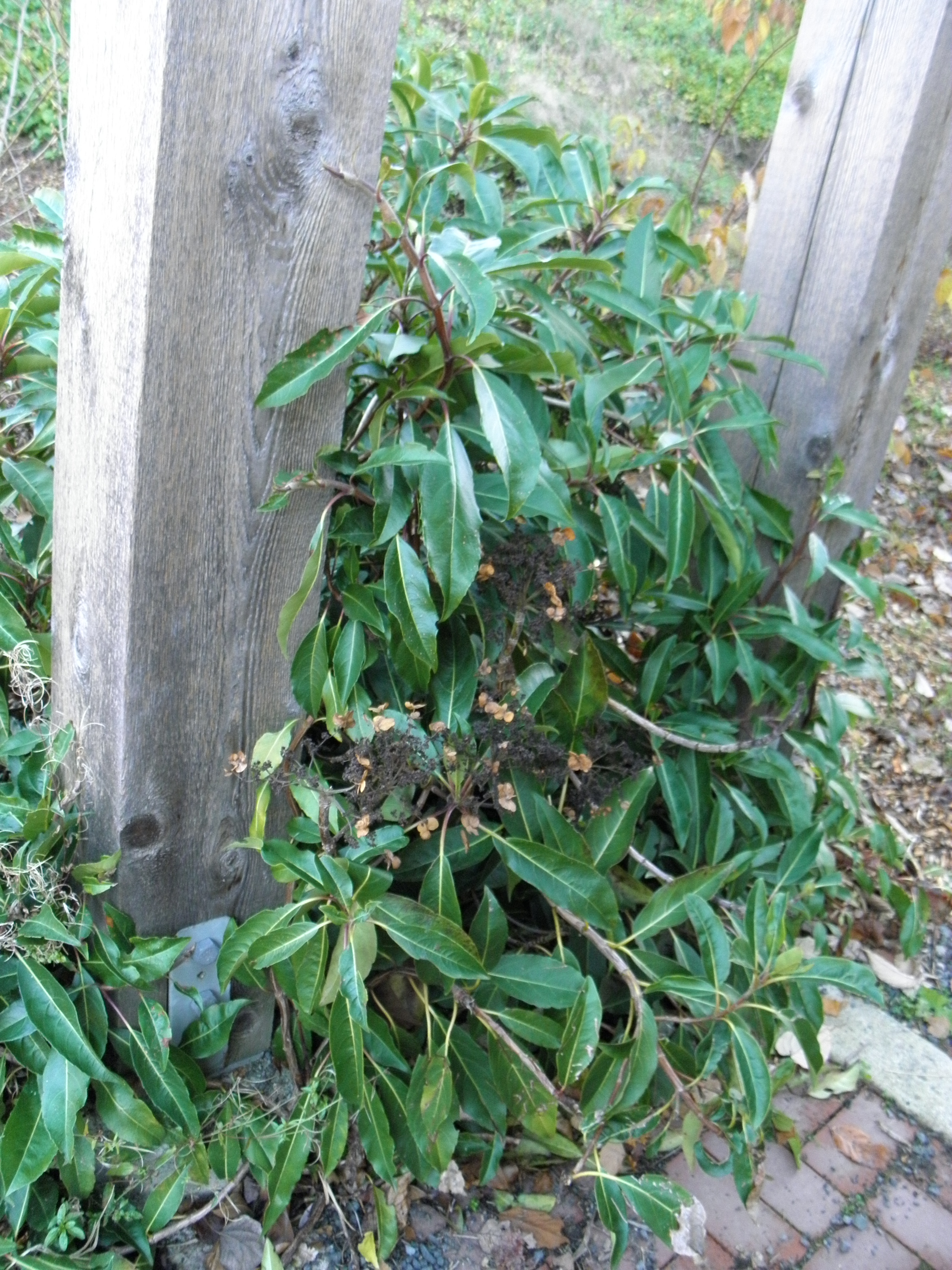
- Hydrangea integrifolia is self-climbing.

Scientific classification
- Kingdom: Plantae
- Clade: Tracheophytes
- Clade: Angiosperms
- Clade: Eudicots
- Clade: Asterids
- Order: Cornales
- Family: Hydrangeaceae
- Genus: Hydrangea
- Species: H. integrifolia

Binomial name
- Hydrangea integrifolia Hayata

= Hydrangea integrifolia =

Species of flowering plant

Hydrangea integrifolia is a species of flowering plant in the family Hydrangeaceae, native to Taiwan and the Philippines at elevations above 8,000 ft. (2,400 m.).

== Distribution and ecology ==
Hydrangea integrifolia is found scrambling along shady woodland floors, up tree trunks, and over rocky outcroppings. It grows in partially shaded areas and on coastal cliffs under salt spray.

== Description ==
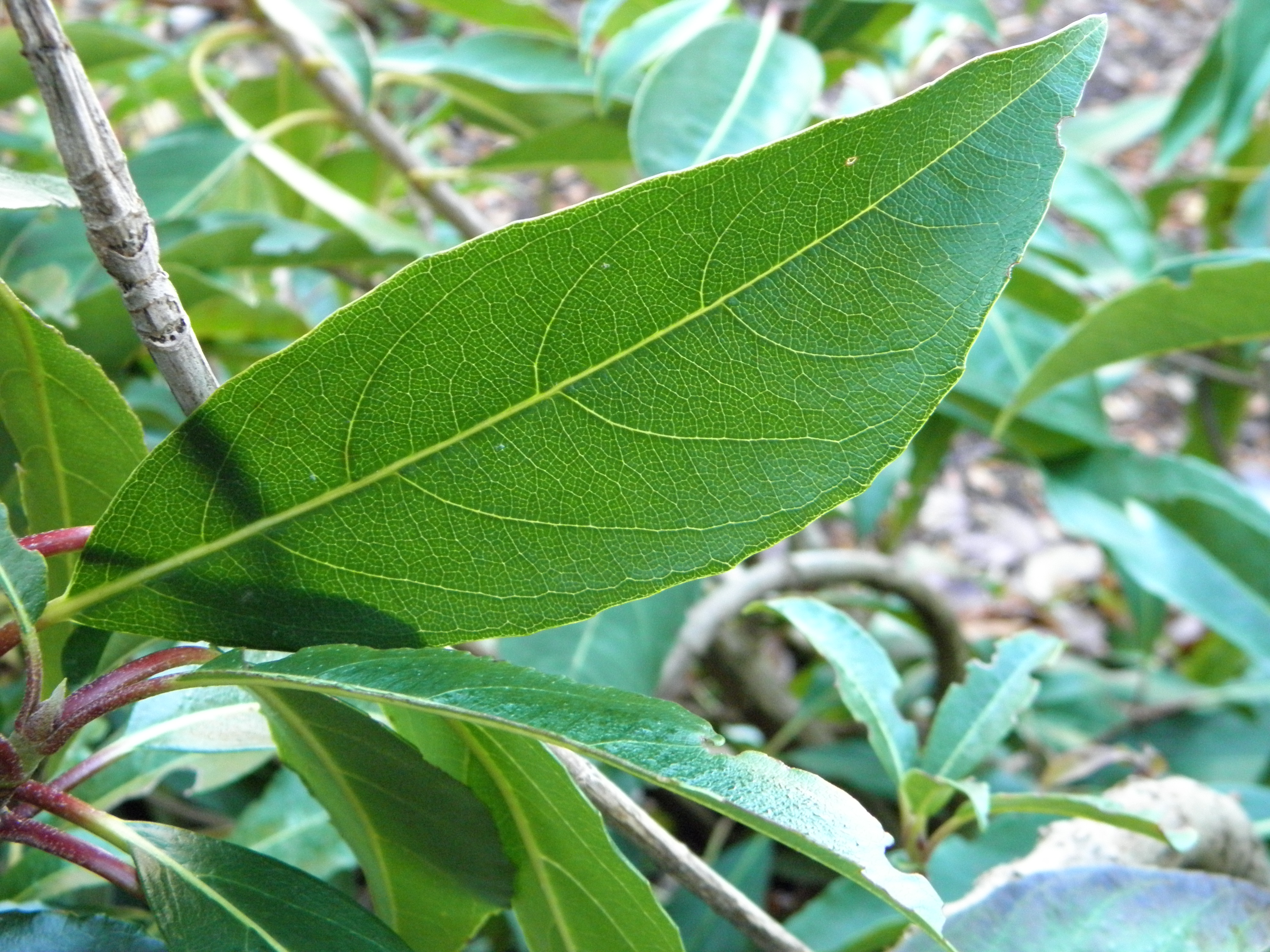
Hydrangea integrifolia leaves have red petioles.

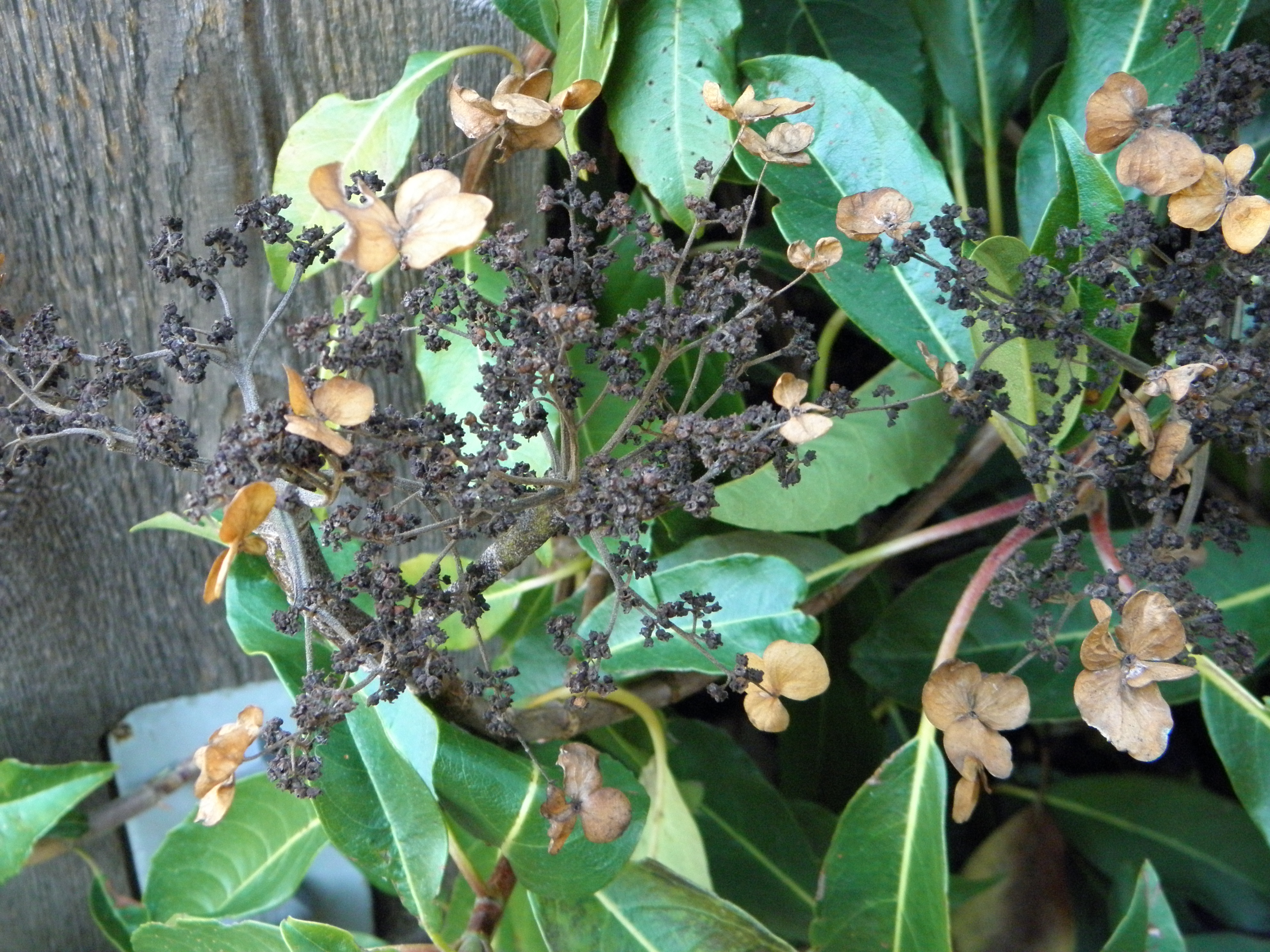
Hydrangea integrifolia retains its dried lace-cap blooms.

Hydrangea integrifolia is a vine with adventitious roots that enable it to climb without assistance onto any nearby solid structure. The leaves are about 6 inches (15 cm) long, dark green, and glossy with a leathery texture. Their overall shape is elongated and ovate with undulating and toothed margins. Leaves are held opposite and in pairs along the stems. The petioles on newer or top growth appear bright red while others show yellow-green. Flower buds appear somewhat differently from other Hydrangeas in that they resemble over-sized golf balls prior to opening. H. integrifolia blooms open around June with terminal cymes displaying many small, white blossoms. Flowers resemble those of deciduous Hydrangeas in lace-cap form—though most often without the sterile blooms around the edges of the cyme. Spent blooms dry and are retained through the season. Fruits are dry, brown capsules.

== Cultivation and uses ==
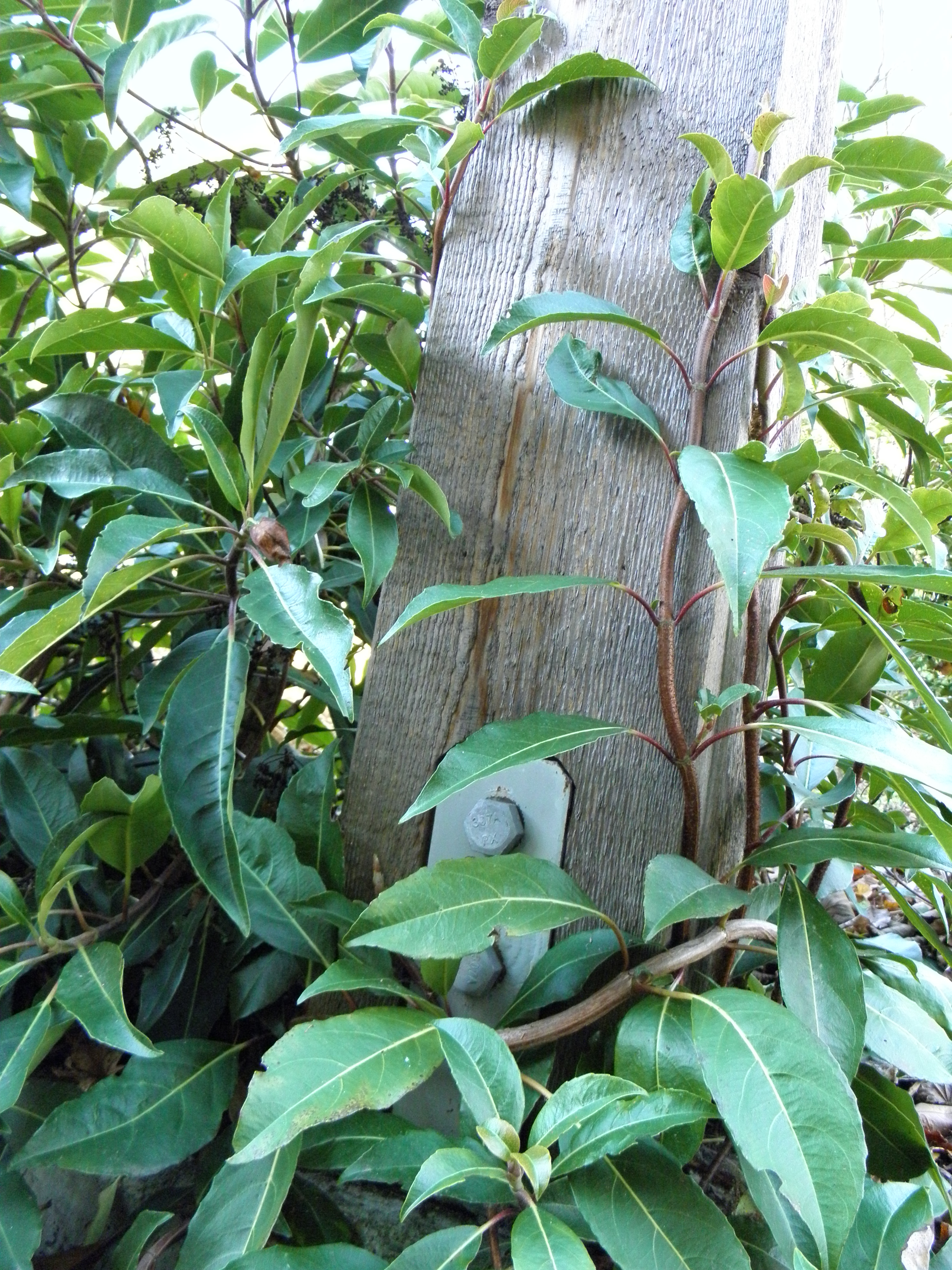
Hydrangea integrifolia climbs with adventitious roots. Its leaves are paired and opposite.

Hydrangea integrifolia is primarily used as an ornamental. It is vigorous but grows slowly enough to not become invasive. It is salt tolerant and shade tolerant though full shade will reduce the amount of blooming. H. integrifolia requires regular watering, well-drained soil and sturdy supports. It can handle full sun to partial or dappled shade. H. intergrifolia may take 5 to 7 years to reach maturity and begin blooming but will bring layered texture and brightness high up in shady areas where these traits are rare. It fares best in milder climates such as USDA hardiness zones 8a to 10b. Pruning is only necessary for aesthetics and is typically limited to minor training of growth and deadheading. H. integrifolia can be propagated by cuttings and seeds.
