= Îlot =

Îlot (French: ilôt meaning "small island" in English) may refer to:

- Îlot des Capucins
- Îlot du Diable
- Îlot de La Boisselle
- Îlot Pasteur
- Îlot-Trafalgar-Gleneagles
- Ilots du Mouillage
- Îlots des Rashad el Jabr
