= Shemsedin Kirjatani House =

Cultural heritage monument of Kosovo

- Shtëpia e familjes Arapi (Albanian)
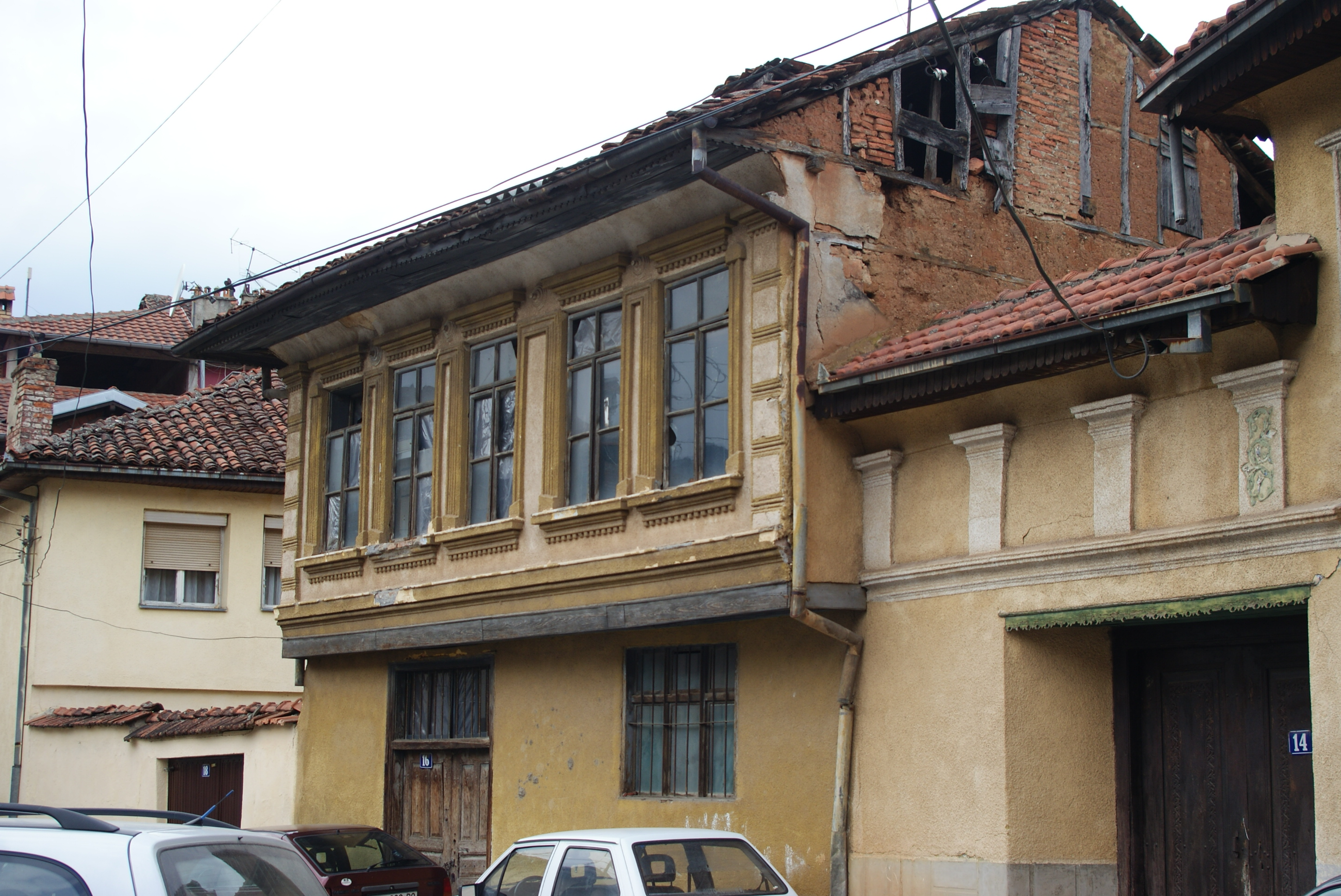
- Location: Prizren, Kosovo

History
- Built: 19th century

The Shemsedin Kirjatani House is a cultural heritage monument in Prizren, Kosovo.

== History ==
The Shemsedin Kirjatani House is typical of the area, including two floors and a basement, but was limited by lack of funds to only half a second floor. A central porch on the ground floor serves as the entrance. A hallway leads from the porch to three rooms and the stairs up to the unfinished first floor's lobby and east room. The building's foundation, basement, and ground floor up to 1 metre (3.3 ft) are made from stone with lime mortar, but the walls from there up consist of the wood-studded brick known as bondruk. Three gutters are covered by the roof tiles above the ground floor, while four top the first. The façade includes some symmetrical elements but is unusual for the area. Elaborate interior features include the geometrically decorated ceilings as well as wooden moldings on those and the windows and cupboards. Mirrors brought from Turkey by a barber owner are a highlight. Entry is through the main gate and a cobblestone courtyard including a mutfaku (fountain) dating to construction. A channel of river stone in front of the house funneled water needed there through the neighboring yards. Recent additions include an annex built in the 1970s on the northwestern side with the current kitchen and bathroom, as well as a renovation of the roof funded by the Kosovo Ministry of Culture, Youth, and Sports in 2011.
