= Fort de la Fraternité =

Fort in Roscanvel, France

- îlot du Diable, Roscanvel, France
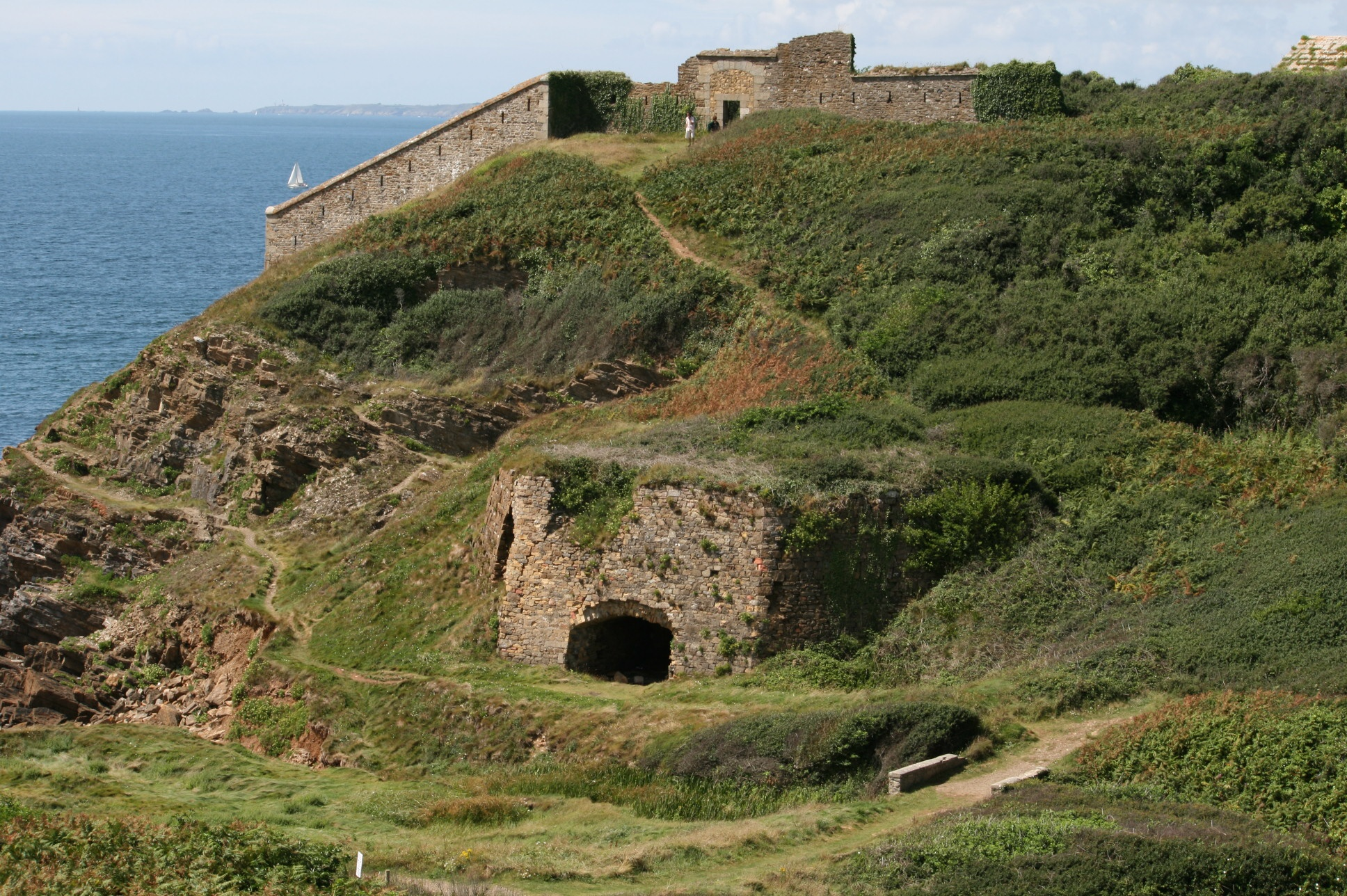
- Fort de la Fraternité

Location
- Fort de la Fraternité located in France Map
- Coordinates: 48.3079°N 4.5727°W

Site history
- Built: 1791

The Fort de la Fraternité (fort of brotherhood) is a fort located on the îlot du Diable in Roscanvel, France. The whole complex is now in ruins, though a gunpowder magazine is still standing, with a roof of large rectangular tiles and elaborate guttering.

The fort was built in 1791 (around a gun battery built in 1695) as part of the defences around the goulet de Brest. It was modified in the second half of the 19th century, though it was abandoned by the military in 1870 and turned into a storehouse for wood and lime (a lime kiln at the site dates to 1800, and a limestone seam on the site continued to be exploited until 1875).

A casemate was added by the Germans in 1942.

Fort de la Fraternité
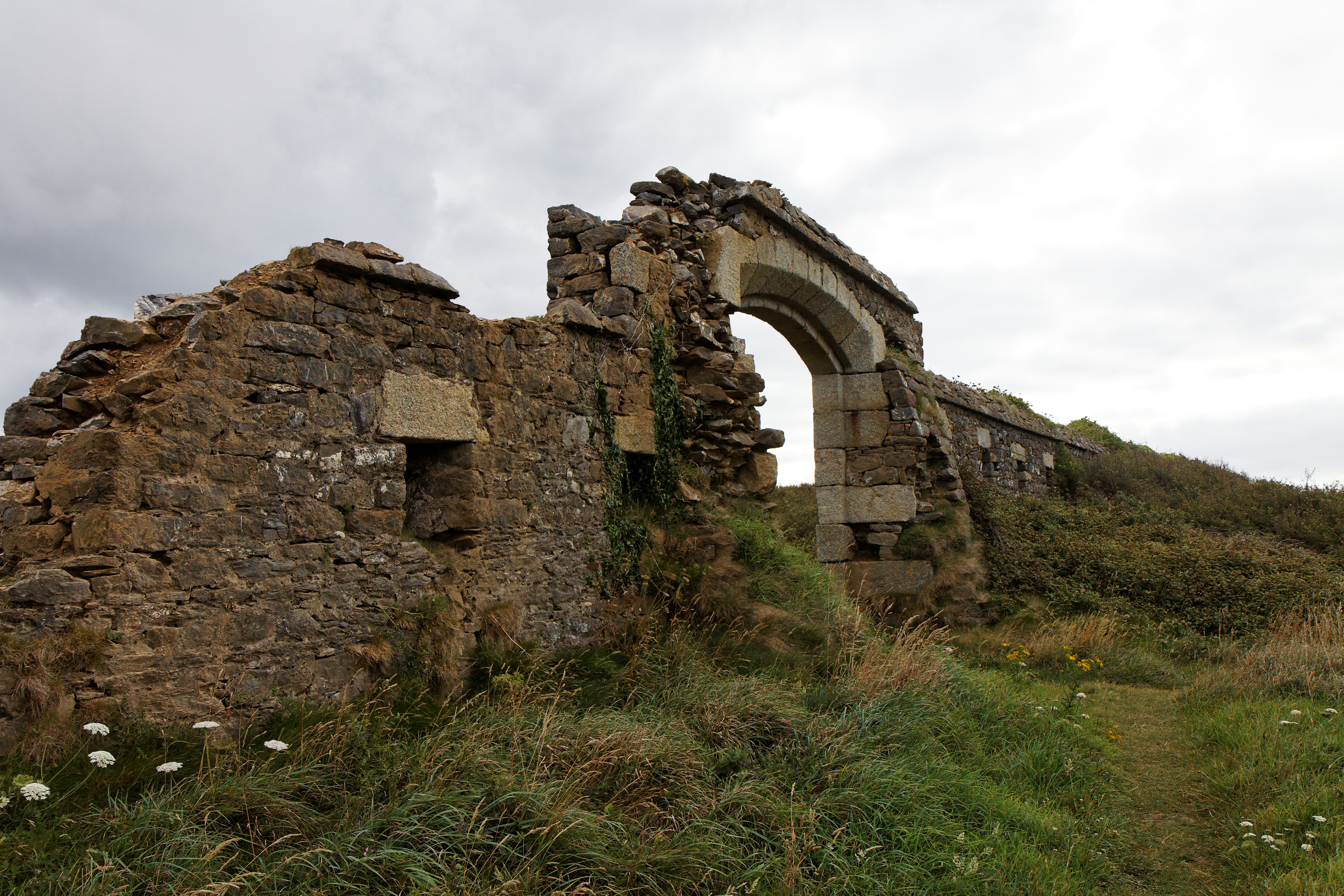
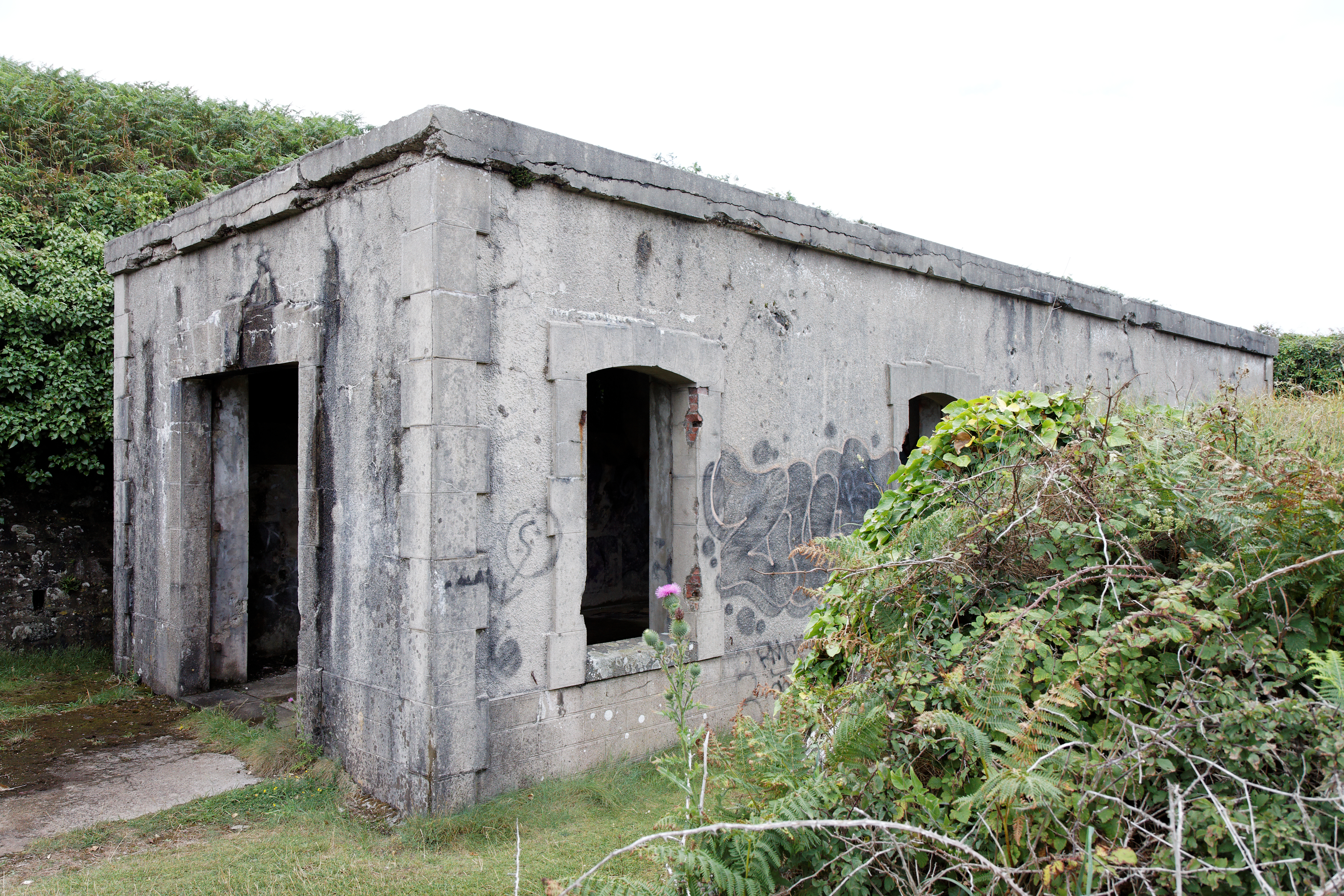
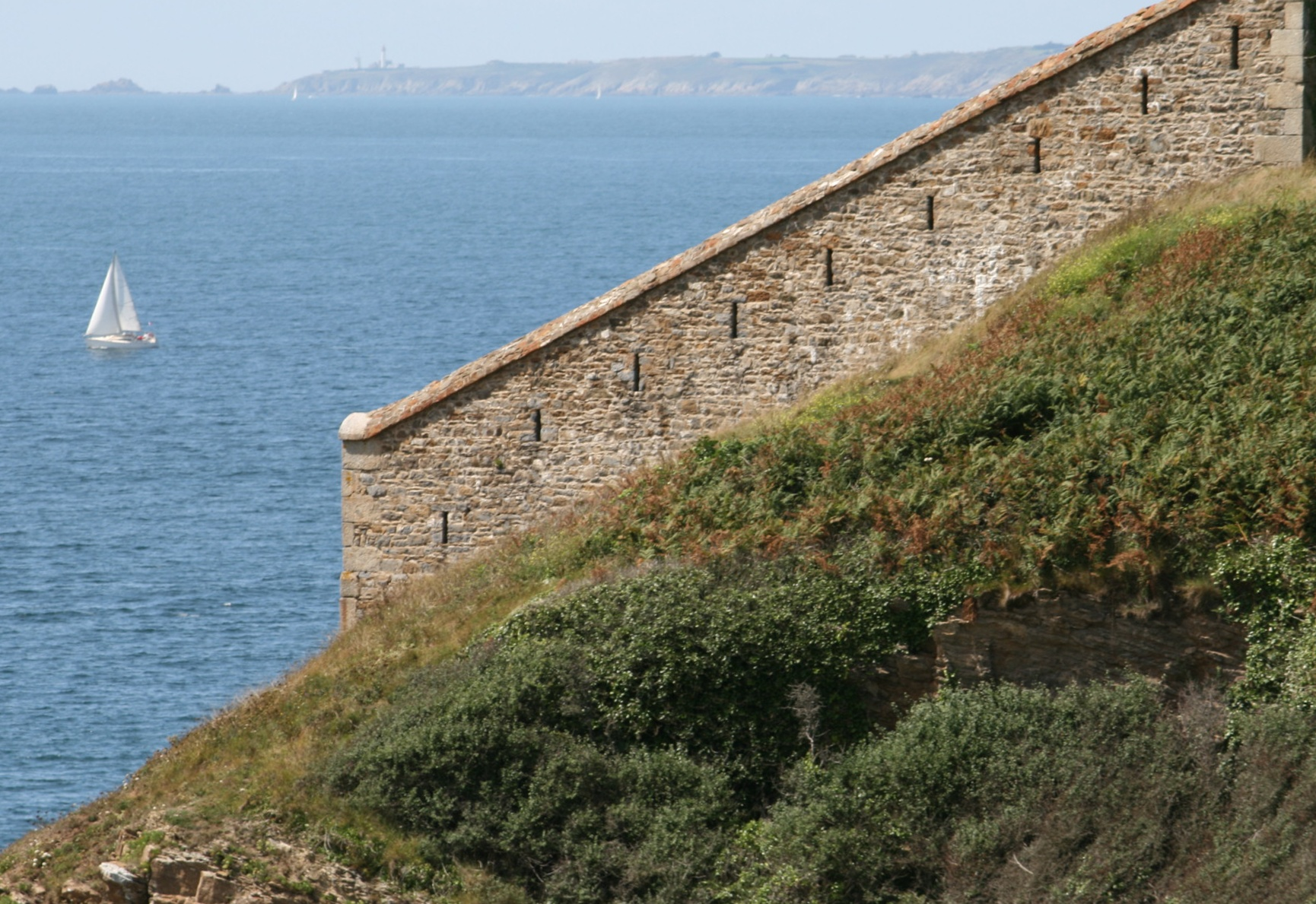
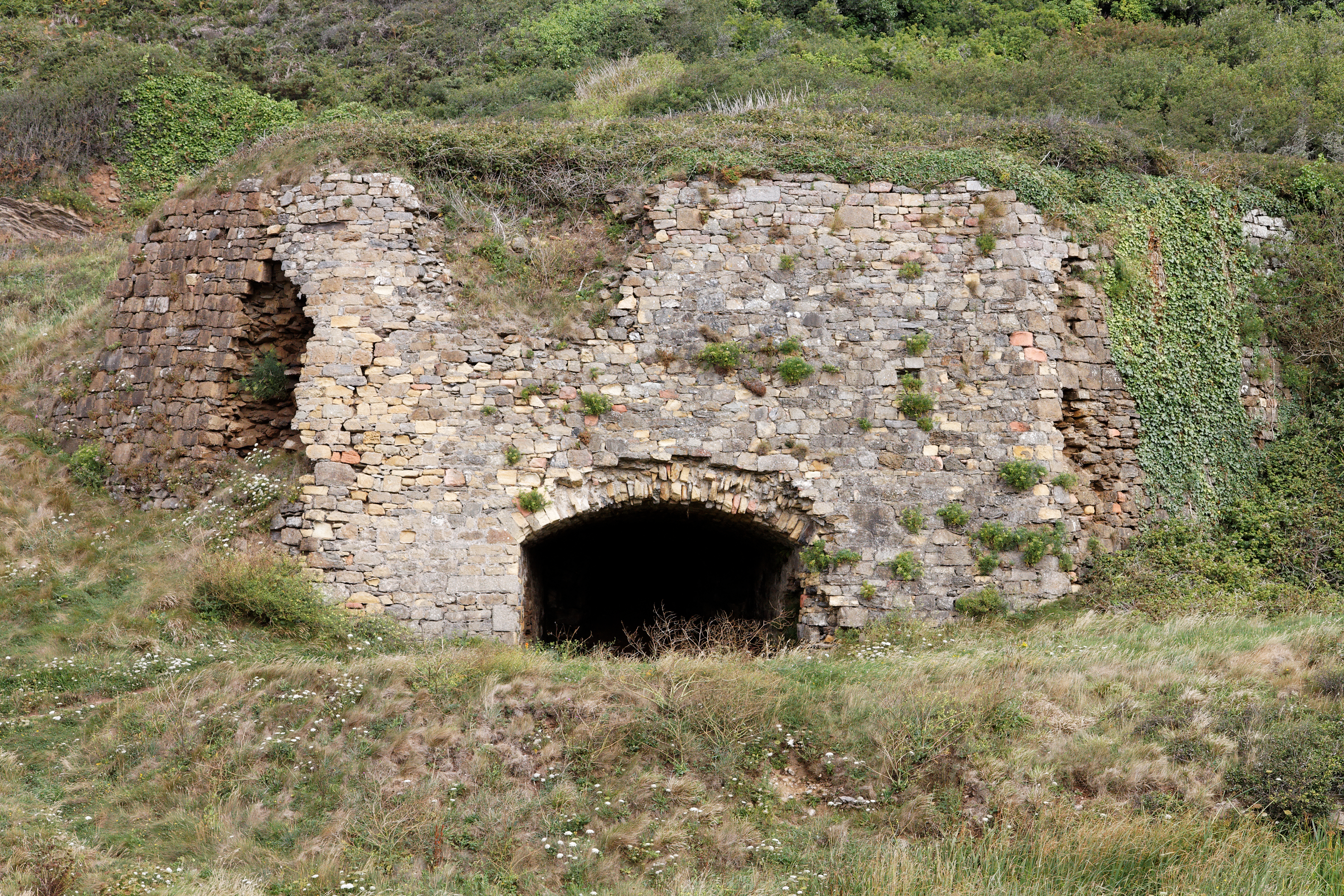
