= Nuomi Bridge =

Stone arch bridge in Nantou County, Taiwan

Nuomi Bridge 糯米橋
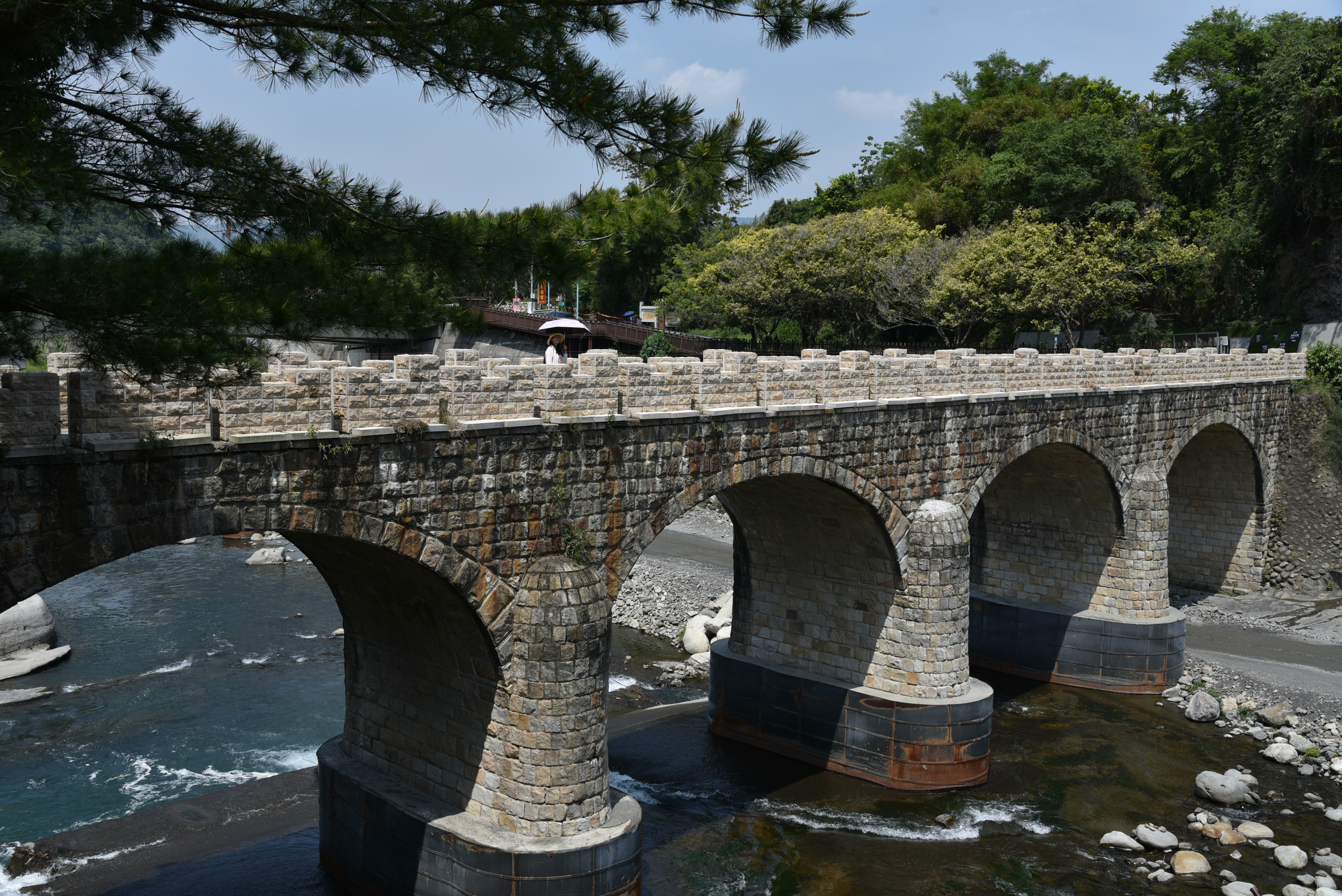
- Nuomi Bridge in 2020.
- Coordinates: 24°03′30.7″N 120°54′23.1″E
- Crosses: Beigang River
- Locale: Guoxing, Nantou County, Taiwan

Characteristics
- Material: Masonry using sticky rice mortar
- Total length: 53 m (174 ft)
- Width: 5 m (16 ft)
- Height: 20 m (66 ft)
- No. of spans: 4

History
- Construction end: 1940

Nuomi Bridge (Chinese: 糯米橋; pinyin: Nuòmǐqiáo; lit. 'sticky rice bridge'), alternatively the Nuomishih Bridge (糯米石橋) or the Beigangxi Stone Bridge (北港溪石橋), is a masonry arch bridge in Guoxing, Nantou County, Taiwan. Completed in 1940, the bridge spans the Beigang River, one of the headwaters of the Dadu River, near Beigang Village. The bridge is known for its use of sticky rice mortar and is a protected monument in Nantou County.

== History ==
Before the Nuomi Bridge was built, a simple wooden bridge existed near the site. During Japan's rule over Taiwan, the Imperial Japanese Army Air Service wished to shorten the transportation time between its two airfields in Tōsei (now Dongshi) and Hori (now Puli), so a road was built transversing through the mountainous terrain. The Japanese chose to replace the wooden bridge with a masonry bridge, and as a part of the military's infrastructure, special care was taken with the quality of the construction. Since the bridge was located in an isolated area, local laborers and materials were used: the stone was taken from the nearby hills southwest of Beigang Village, while the mortar was created using a traditional method by combining lime, glutinous rice, and brown sugar (known as sticky rice mortar). Construction was completed in 1940, (Note: Or 1941.) and after its completion, the bridge became an important transportation link in the region.

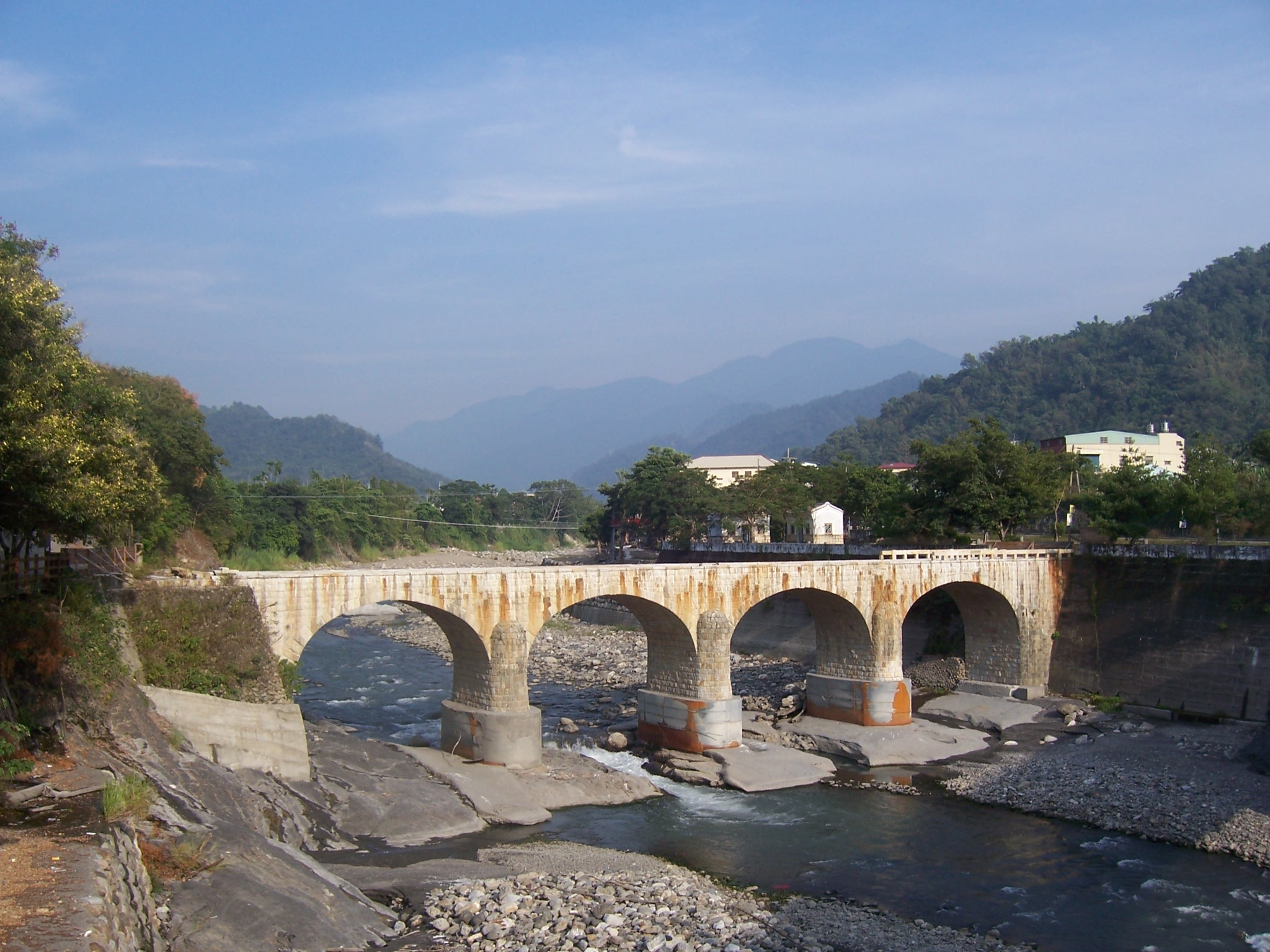
Nuomi Bridge in 2009. Note the lack of a railing.

Nuomi Bridge once carried Provincial Highway 21 until 1987, when a new bridge for cars was built immediately downstream to the west. In 1994, the bridge was protected as a county-level monument for its historic value. However, the new bridge restricted the river's streamflow, which resulted in a flood during Typhoon Mindulle in 2004 destroying the bridge's deck (though the spans remained intact). A new deck was completed 2008, only to be destroyed again during Typhoon Morakot in 2009. Therefore, the downstream bridge was rebuilt in 2014, this time with consideration to streamflow, and Nuomi Bridge was repaired and reopened to the public in 2019.

== See also ==
- List of bridges in Taiwan
