= Guoxing =

Rural township in Nantou County, Taiwan

Coordinates: 24°3′18″N 120°52′12″E

Guoxing Township 國姓鄉
- Rural township
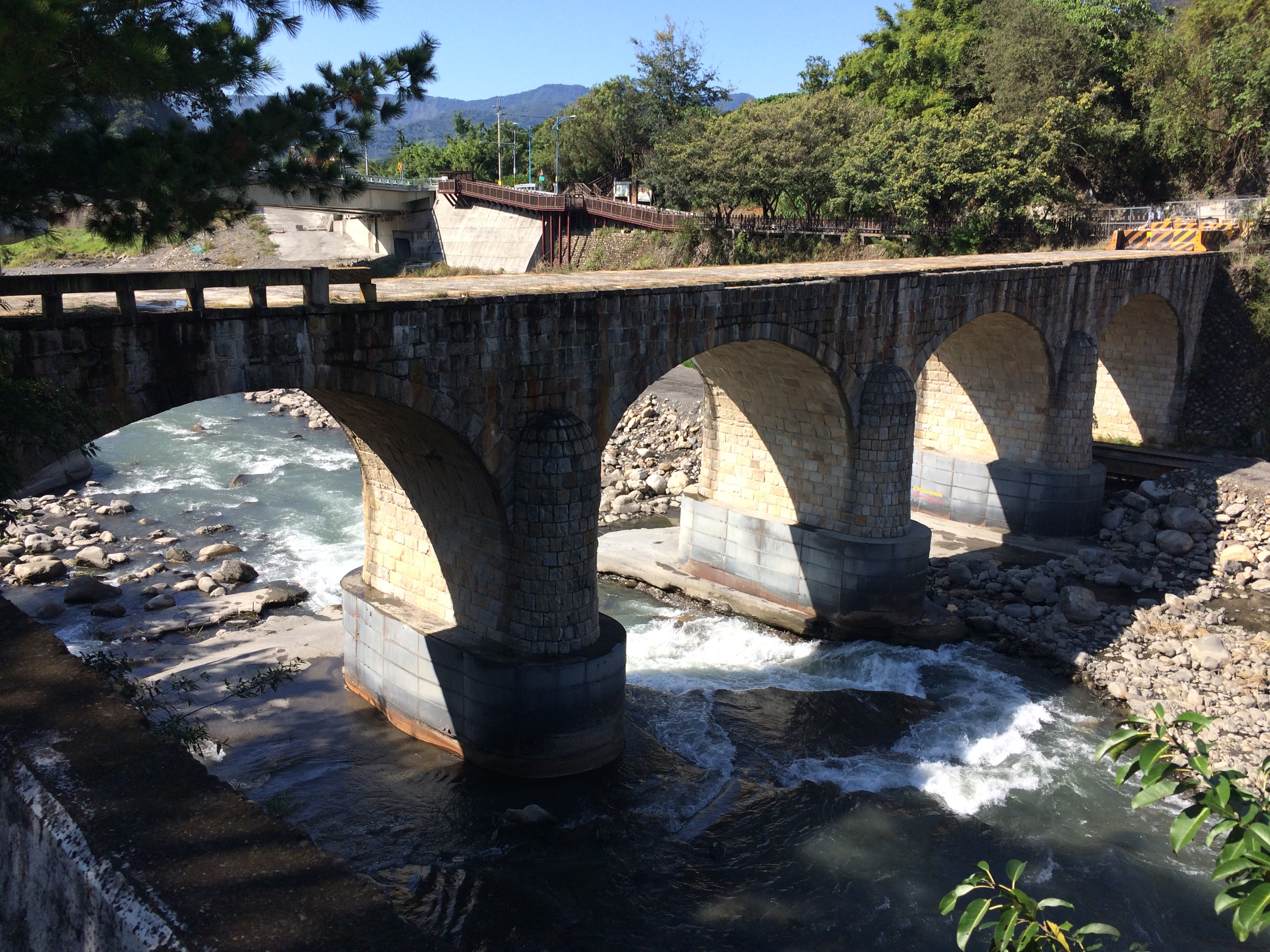
- Nuomi Bridge over the Beigang River in Guoxing Township

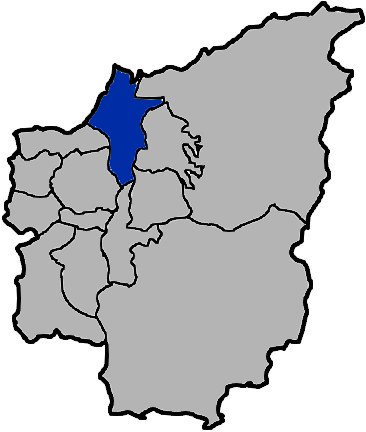
- Guoxing Township in Nantou County
- Location: Nantou County, Taiwan

Area
  - Total: 176 km^{2} (68 sq mi)

Population (February 2023)
  - Total: 17,168
  - Density: 97.5/km^{2} (253/sq mi)

Guoxing Township (Chinese: 國姓鄉; pinyin: Guóxìng Xiāng; Wade–Giles: Kuo^{2}-hsing^{4} Hsiang^{1}) is a rural township in Nantou County, Taiwan. As of February 2023, the township has a population total of 17,168.

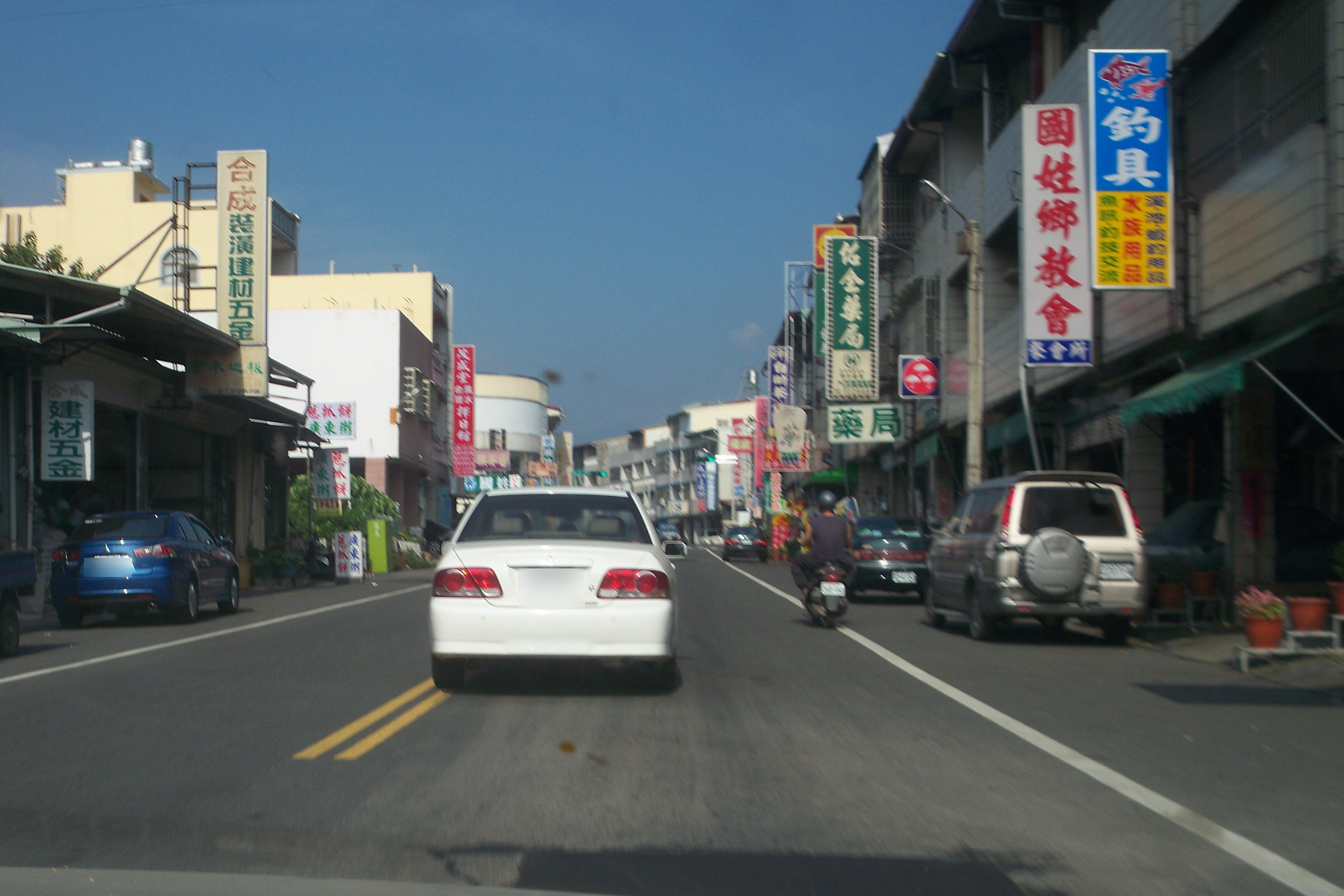
The main street in Guoxing Township

Guoxing Township is located about 22 kilometres (14 mi) east of central Taichung City. The township is named after Koxinga.

== Administrative divisions ==
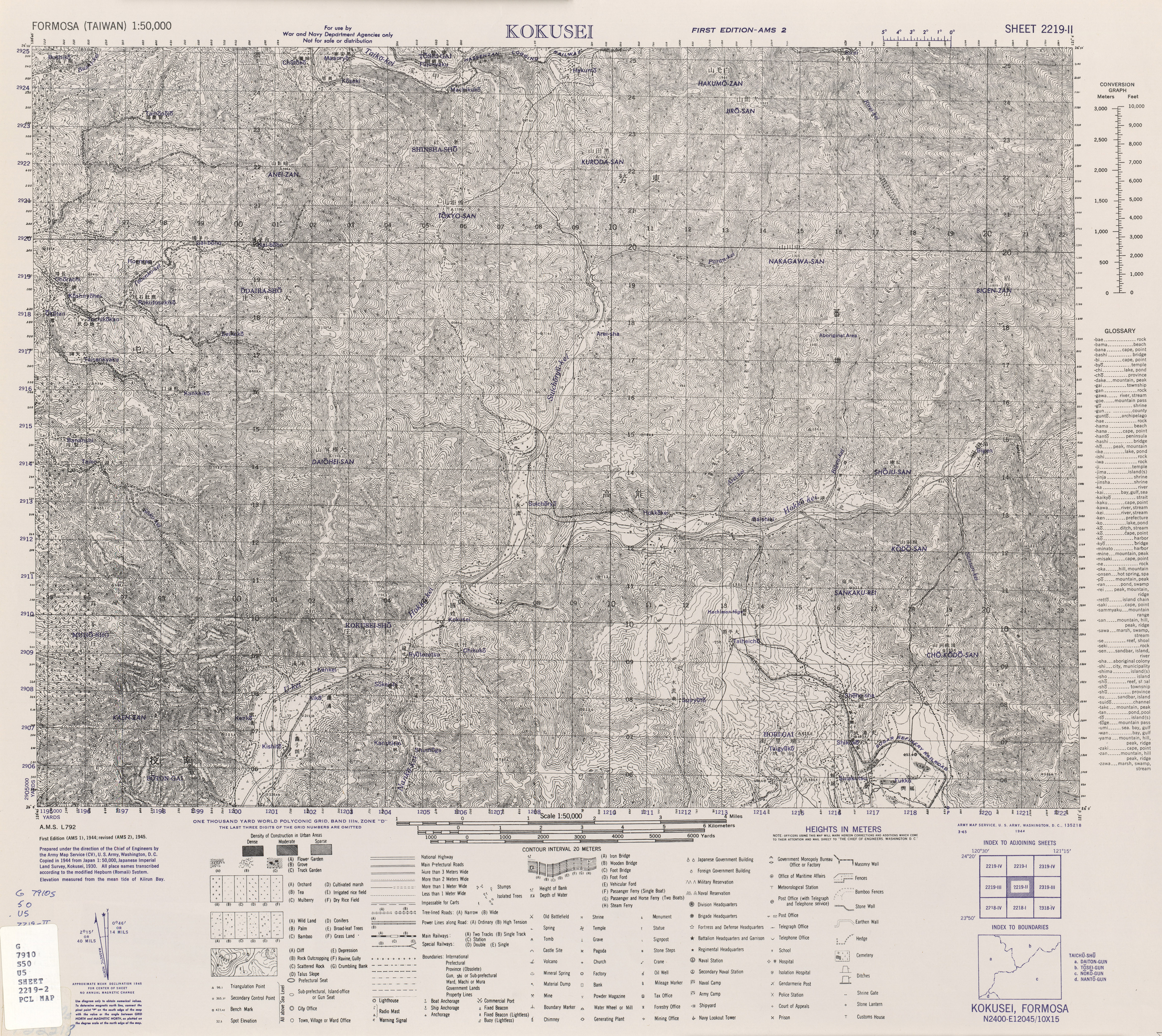
Map of Guoxing (labeled as Kokusei) and surrounding area (1944)

Guoxing, Shimen, Daqi, Zhangliu, Zhangfeng, Zhangfu, Beigang, Fugui, Gangou, Ganlin, Dashi, Beishan and Nangang Villages.

== Tourist attractions ==
- Nuomi Bridge

== Notable natives ==
- Peng Pai-hsien, Magistrate of Nantou County (2001)

== Transportation ==
Guoxing Interchange connects Guoxing Township to National freeway 6.

Guoxing Township is served by Nantou Bus, Taichung Bus, and Chuan Hang Bus.
