= Sticky rice mortar =

Building material used in China

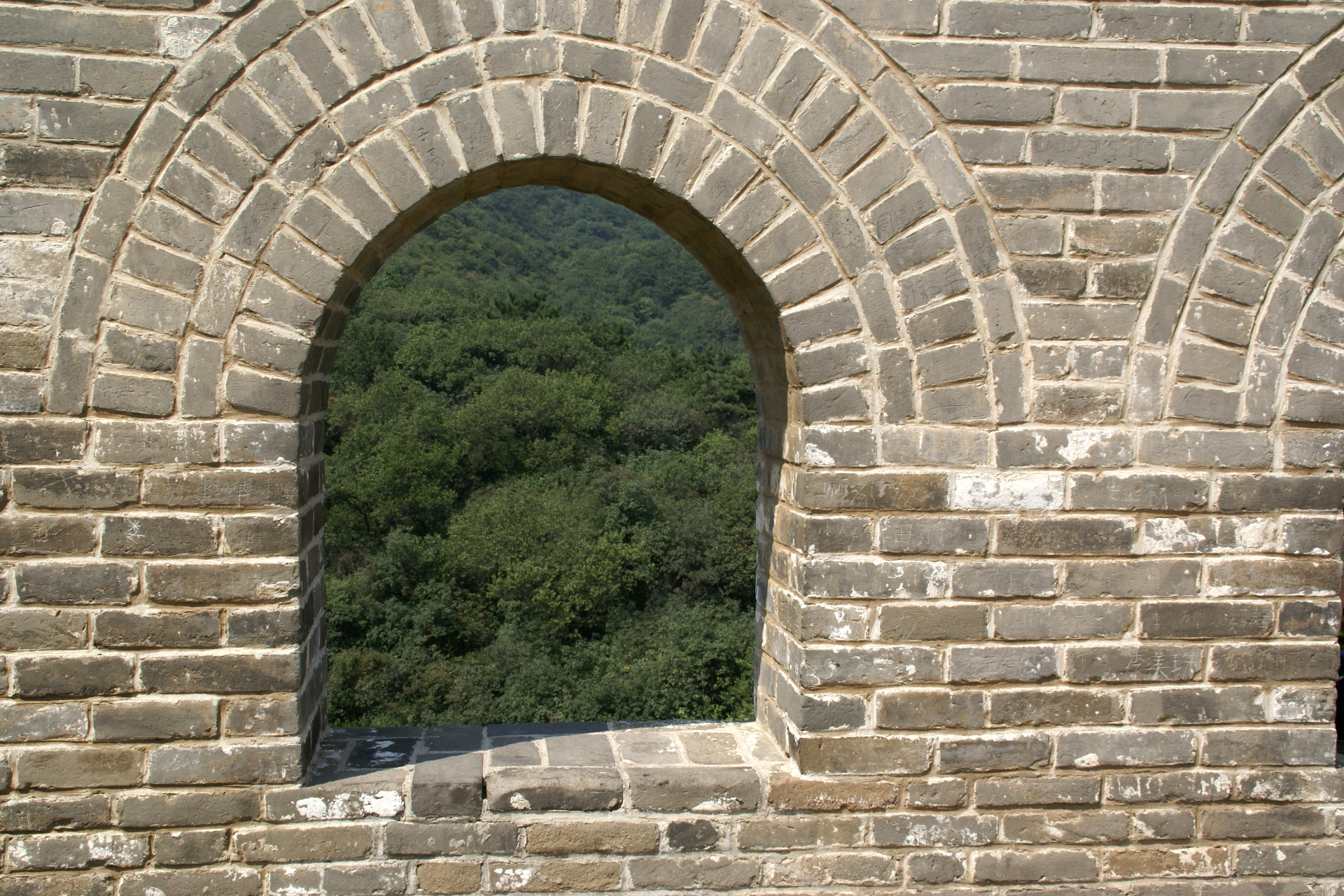
The bricks of the Great Wall of China are held together by sticky rice mortar.

Sticky rice mortar is an ancient building material that originated in China. It utilized organic materials such as sticky rice soup along with inorganic materials such as slaked lime to form a mortar. Its usage has been dated to the Northern Wei Dynasty from the fourth century CE. The mortar provided extra strength, resilience, and water resistance to structures, and hence was an important component in the construction of several historical buildings, including walls and other structures across China.

== History ==
Sticky rice mortar originated in China. Its origin can be traced back to the Northern Wei Dynasty from the fourth century CE. While it was introduced much earlier, its use became widespread during the Ming Dynasty in the later Middle Ages, when it formed a key component of large construction projects such as the Great Wall of China and other monuments.

== Composition ==
The ingenuity of incorporating sticky rice, a readily available food source, into a building material showcases advanced traditional Chinese engineering knowledge. This practice was a closely guarded secret among master masons for centuries. Sticky rice soup was mixed with slaked lime to make an inorganic−organic composite mortar that had more strength and water resistance than lime mortar. The sticky rice was typically boiled to a thick soup or gruel, which was then mashed and added to the lime. Modern chemists identified amylopectin, a type of polysaccharide, or complex carbohydrate, found in rice and other starchy foods that appeared to be responsible for the sticky rice mortar's strength and durability.

== Uses ==
Sticky rice mortar had high adhesive strength, sturdiness, waterproofing capability, and prevented weeds from growing, as crude mortar made of sticky rice and burnt lime created a seal between bricks that would rival modern cement in strength. It played a major role in maintaining the durability of the Great Wall, as well as tombs, pagodas, and city walls. Sections of the Great Wall of China were widely built with bricks, lime mortar and sticky rice used to reinforce the bricks strongly enough to resist earthquakes and modern bulldozers while keeping the building intact. Other structures built with sticky rice mortar, such as the walls of Xi'an and Nanjing, have been standing for a significant amount of time against the natural elements and other human activities. The amylopectin enhances the cohesive forces within the mortar, leading to significantly higher compressive and flexural strength. It has higher water resistance than traditional mortar.
