= Îlot Pasteur =

Building in Monaco

Coordinates: 43°43′49.4″N 7°24′53.2″E

- Interactive map of the Îlot Pasteur area

General information
- Type: Government
- Location: Monaco
- Construction started: 2016
- Completed: ongoing

Design and construction
- Architects: Christian Curau; François Lallemand

The Îlot Pasteur is a building on the western edge of Monaco under construction since 2016. It will be home to a new middle school, a post office, a recycling center, a data center, an underground carpark.

== History ==
Its construction was announced in 2013, and it began in January 2016. The building is designed by architects Christian Curau and François Lallemand.
