= Îlot du Diable =

Coordinates: 48°18′23″N 4°34′24″W

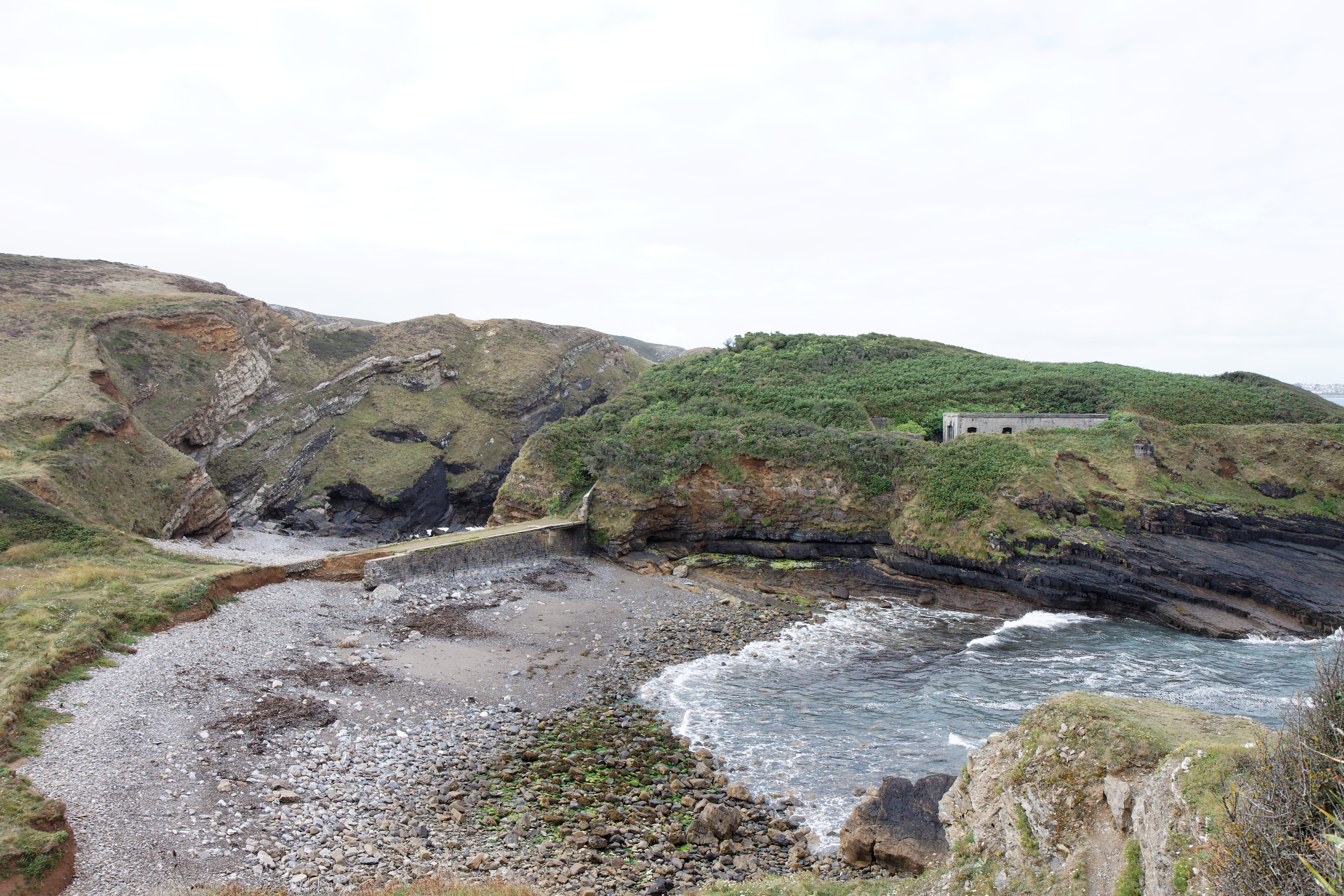
Partial view of Îlot du Diable

Îlot du Diable is a gun battery built to support fort de la Fraternité in the defensive system around the goulet de Brest in France. It is sited on the peninsula of Roscanvel and is accessible by a small bridge. The battery was razed in the 19th century, and in 1890 on its site was built a bunker with an electricity generator. A casemate was then added by the Germans in 1942. A small observation is still to be found at the summit of the site, near a former lime kiln.
