= Ilots du Mouillage =

Islands in New Caledonia, France

- Interactive map of Ilots du Mouillage

Geography
- Coordinates: 19°53′20″S 158°28′21″E
- Archipelago: Chesterfield Islands
- Total islands: 3

Administration
- France
- Overseas collectivity: New Caledonia

The Ilots du Mouillage are three small islands in New Caledonia, an overseas territory of France.

== Geography ==
They are a group of small cays also known as Les Trois Ilots du Mouillage ("the three anchorage islands"). They are situated behind the East Barrier Reef, a part of the Chesterfield Reef system. The cays are located along the eastern edge of the lagoon, just at the rearside of the barrier reef. This is where the reefs and cays provide boats with protection from the strong waves of the Pacific. The eastern portion of the lagoon is guarded by a row of low rocks, while a sandbar protects the western portion.
