= Lime mortar =

Building material

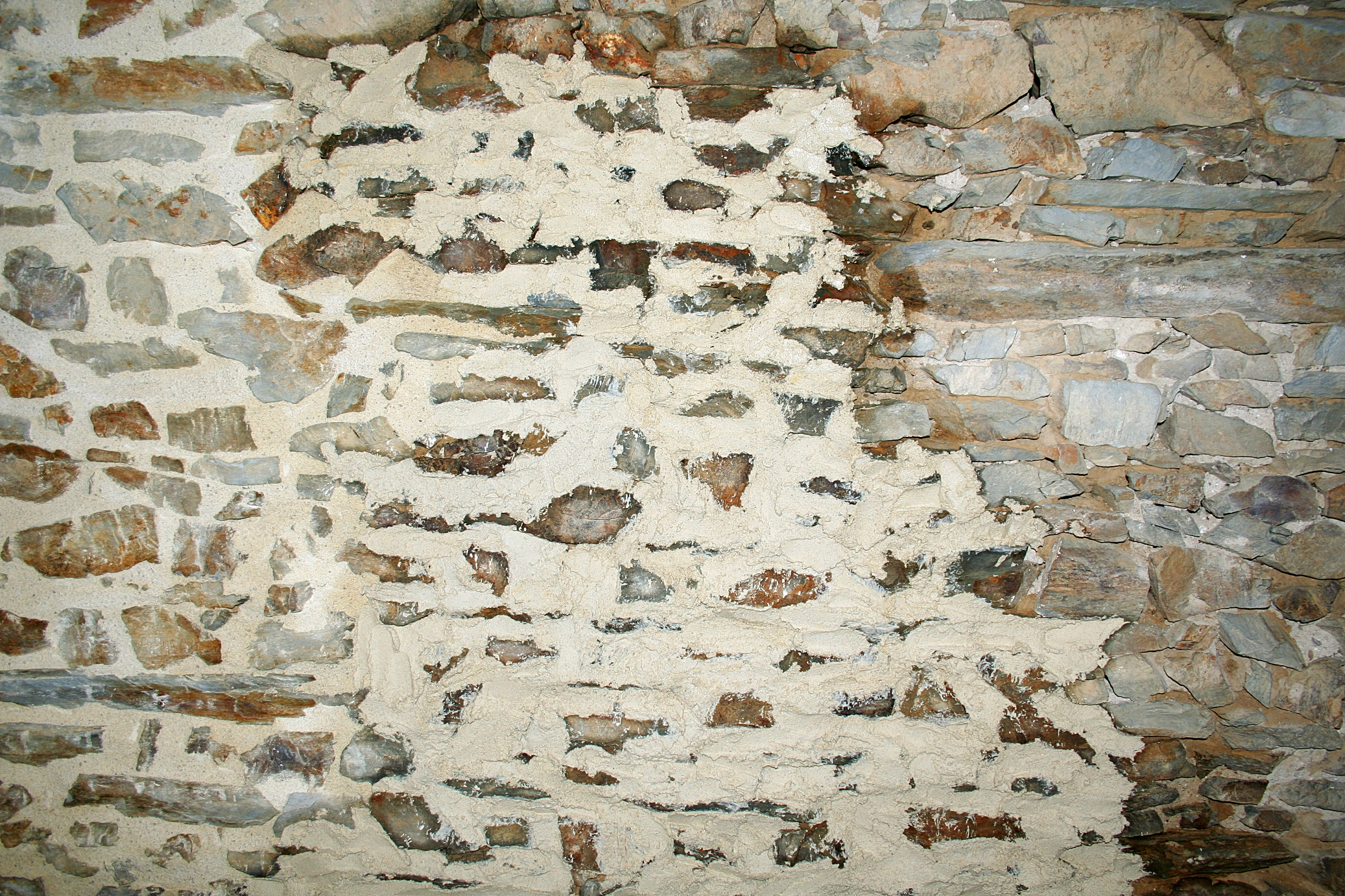
A stone wall in France with lime mortar grouting being applied. Right: unapplied. Centre: lime mortar applied with a trowel. Left: lime mortar applied and then beaten back and brushed with a churn brush.

Lime mortar or torching is a masonry mortar composed of lime and an aggregate such as sand, mixed with water. It is one of the oldest known types of mortar, used in ancient Rome and Greece, when it largely replaced the clay and gypsum mortars common to ancient Egyptian construction.

With the introduction of Portland cement during the 19th century, the use of lime mortar in new constructions gradually declined. This was largely due to the ease of use of Portland cement, its quick setting, and high compressive strength. However, the soft and porous properties of lime mortar provide certain advantages when working with softer building materials such as natural stone and terracotta. For this reason, while Portland cement continues to be commonly used in new brick and concrete construction, its use is not recommended in the repair and restoration of brick and stone-built structures originally built using lime mortar.

Despite its enduring utility over many centuries (Roman concrete), lime mortar's effectiveness as a building material has not been well understood; time-honoured practices were based on tradition, folklore and trade knowledge, vindicated by the vast number of old buildings that remain standing. Empirical testing in the late 20th century provided a scientific understanding of its remarkable durability. Both professionals and do-it-yourself home owners can purchase lime putty mortar (and have their historical mortar matched for both color and content) by companies that specialize in historical preservation and sell pre-mixed mortar in small batches.

== Etymology ==
Lime comes from Old English lim ('sticky substance, birdlime, mortar, cement, gluten'), and is related to Latin limus ('slime, mud, mire'), and linere ('to smear'). Mortar is a mixture with cement and comes from Old French mortier ('builder's mortar, plaster; bowl for mixing') in the late 13th century and Latin mortarium ('mortar'). Lime is a cement which is a binder or glue that holds things together but cement is usually reserved for Portland cement.

== History ==
Lime mortar appeared in Antiquity. The ancient Egyptians were the first to use lime mortar about 6,000 years ago; lime mortar was used, for example, to plaster the pyramids at Giza. In addition, the Egyptians also incorporated various limes into their religious temples as well as their homes. Traditional Indian structures were built with lime mortar, some of which are more than 4,000 years old (such as Mohenjo-daro, a heritage monument of Indus Valley civilization in Pakistan).

The Roman Empire used lime-based mortars extensively. Vitruvius, a Roman architect, provided basic guidelines for lime mortar mixes. The Romans created hydraulic mortars that contained lime and a pozzolan such as brick dust or volcanic ash. These mortars were intended to be used in applications where the presence of water would otherwise not allow the mortar to harden (carbonate) properly. Traditional Indian construction used brick dust, called surkhi, as a pozzolan in their mortars.

== Uses ==
Lime mortar today is primarily used in the conservation of buildings originally built using it, but may be used as an alternative to ordinary portland cement. It is made principally of lime (hydraulic, or non hydraulic as explained below), water, and an aggregate such as sand. Portland cement has proven to be incompatible with lime mortar because it is harder, less flexible, and impermeable. These qualities lead to premature deterioration of soft, historic bricks so traditionally, low-temperature-fired lime mortars are recommended for use with existing mortar of a similar type or reconstruction of buildings using historically correct methods. In the past, lime mortar tended to be mixed on site with whatever sand was locally available. Since the sand influences the colour of the lime mortar, colours of pointing mortar can vary dramatically from district to district.

== Hydraulic and non-hydraulic lime ==
Hydraulic lime contains substances which set by hydration, so it can set underwater. Non-hydraulic lime sets by carbonation and so needs exposure to carbon dioxide in the air; the material cannot set underwater or inside a thick wall. For natural hydraulic lime (NHL) mortars, the lime is obtained from limestone naturally containing a sufficient percentage of silica and/or alumina. Artificial hydraulic lime is produced by introducing specific types and quantities of additives to the source of lime during the burning process, or adding a pozzolan to non-hydraulic lime. Non-hydraulic lime is produced from a high purity source of calcium carbonate such as chalk, limestone, or oyster shells.

=== Non-hydraulic lime ===
Non-hydraulic lime is primarily composed of (generally greater than 95%) calcium hydroxide, Ca(OH)_{2}. Non-hydraulic lime is produced by first heating sufficiently pure calcium carbonate to between 954° and 1066 °C, driving off carbon dioxide to produce quicklime (calcium oxide). This is done in a lime kiln. The quicklime is then slaked: hydrated by being thoroughly mixed with enough water to form a slurry (lime putty), or with less water to produce dry powder. This hydrated lime (calcium hydroxide) naturally turns back into calcium carbonate by reacting with carbon dioxide in the air, the entire process being called the lime cycle.

The slaking process involved in creating a lime putty is an exothermic reaction which initially creates a liquid of a creamy consistency. This is then matured for 2 to 3 months—depending upon environmental conditions—to allow time for it to condense and mature into a lime putty.

A matured lime putty is thixotropic, meaning that when a lime putty is agitated it changes from a putty into a more liquid state. This aids its use for mortars as it makes a mortar easier to work with. If left to stand following agitation a lime putty will slowly revert from a thick liquid to a putty state.

As well as calcium-based limestone, dolomitic limes can be produced which are based on calcium magnesium carbonate.

A frequent source of confusion regarding lime mortar stems from the similarity of the terms hydraulic and hydrated.

- Hydrated lime is any lime other than quicklime, and can refer to either hydraulic (hardens under water) or non-hydraulic (does not harden under water) lime.
- Lime putty is always non-hydraulic and will keep indefinitely stored under water. As the name suggests, lime putty is in the form of a putty made from just lime and water.

If the quicklime is slaked with an excess of water then putty or slurry is produced. If just the right quantity of water is used, the result is a dry material (any excess water escaping as steam during heating). This is ground to make hydrated lime powder.

Hydrated, non-hydraulic lime powder can be mixed with water to form lime putty. Before use putty is usually left in the absence of carbon dioxide (usually under water) to mature. Putty can be matured for as little as 24 hours or for many years; an increased maturation time improves the quality of the putty. There is an argument that a lime putty which has been matured for an extended period (over 12 months) becomes so stiff that it is difficult to work.

There is some dispute (Roman concrete) as to the comparative quality of putty formed from dry hydrated lime compared with that produced as putty at the time of slaking. It is generally agreed that the latter is preferable. A hydrated lime will produce a material which is not as "fatty”, being a common trade term for compounds have a smoother buttery texture when worked. Often, due to lengthy and poor storage, the resulting lime produced by hydrated lime will exhibit longer carbonatation periods as well as lower compressive strengths.

Non-hydraulic lime takes longer to set and is weaker than hydraulic lime, and should not be allowed to freeze before it is well set. Although the setting process can be slow, the drying time of a lime mortar must be regulated at a slow rate to ensure a good final set. A rapidly dried lime mortar will result in a low-strength, poor-quality final mortar often displaying shrinkage cracks. In practice, lime mortars are often protected from direct sunlight and wind with damp hessian sheeting or sprayed with water to control the drying rates. But it also has the quality of autogenous healing (self healing) where some free lime dissolves in water and is redeposited in any tiny cracks which form.

=== Oyster shell mortar ===
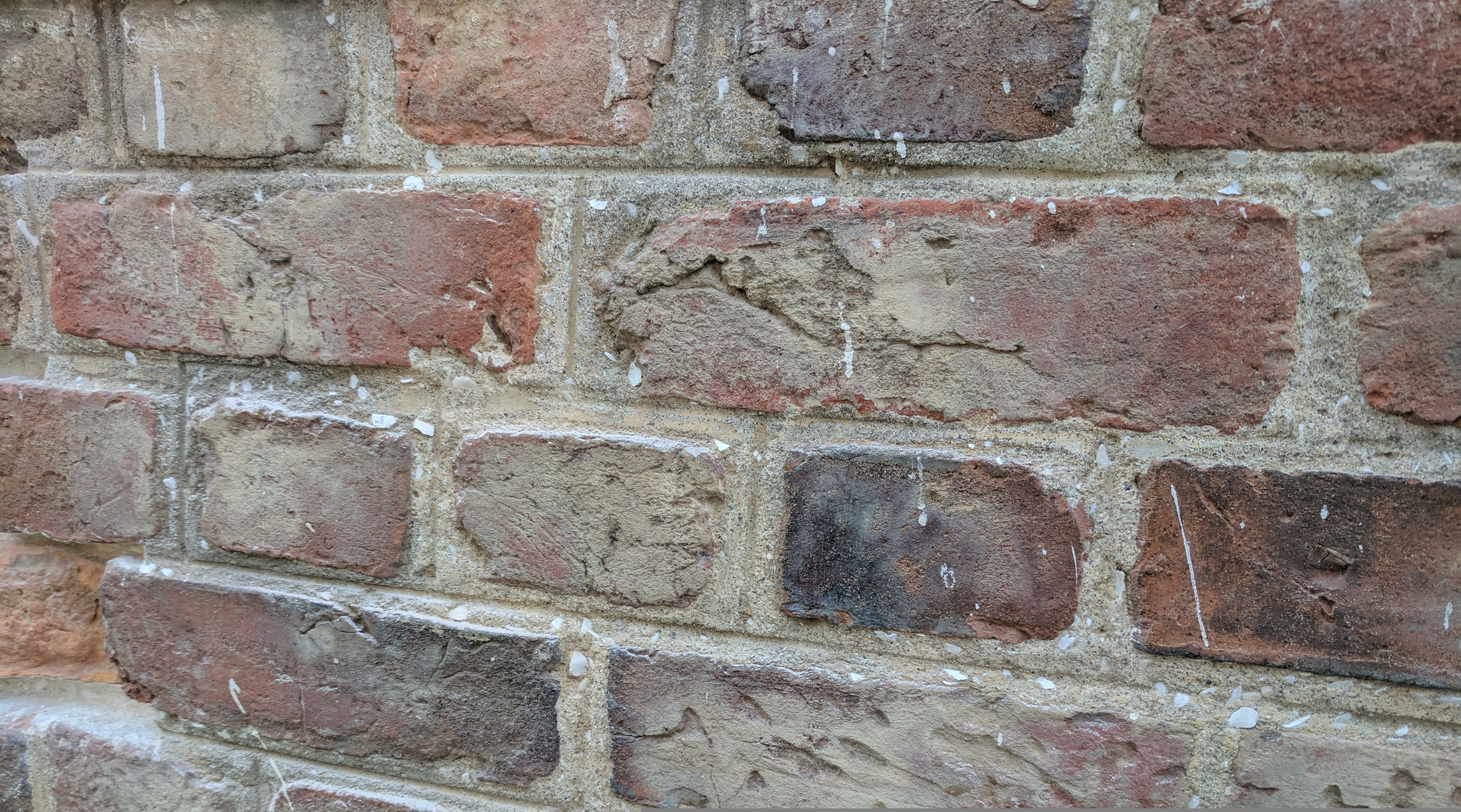
The large flakes of oyster shell are a signal that this is a faux shell mortar. In fact it was a very hard Portland replacement which luckily had not done much harm to the brick.

In the tidewater region of Maryland and Virginia, oyster shells were used to produce quicklime during the colonial period. Similar to other materials used to produce lime, the oyster shells are burned. This can be done in a lime rick instead of a kiln. Burning shells in a rick is something that Colonial Williamsburg and the recreation of Ferry Farm have had to develop from conjecture and in-the-field learning. The rick that they constructed consists of logs set up in a circle that burn slowly, converting oysters that are contained in the wood pile to an ashy powder. The burnt shell can then be slaked and turned into lime putty.

Mortars using oyster shells can sometimes be identified by the presence of small bits of shell in the exposed mortar joint. In restoration masonry, the bits of shell are sometimes exaggerated to give the viewer the impression of authenticity. Unfortunately, these modern attempts often contain higher than necessary ratios of Portland cement. This can cause failures in the brick if the mortar joint is stronger than the brick elements.

=== Hydraulic lime ===
Hydraulic lime sets by reaction with water called hydration.

When a stronger lime mortar is required, such as for external or structural purposes, a pozzolan can be added, which improves its compressive strength and helps to protect it from weathering damage. Pozzolans include powdered brick, heat treated clay, silica fume, fly ash, and volcanic materials. The chemical set imparted ranges from very weak to almost as strong as Portland cement.

This can also assist in creating more regulated setting times of the mortar as the pozzolan will create a hydraulic set, which can be of benefit in restoration projects when time scales and ultimately costs need to be monitored and maintained.

Hydraulic lime can be considered, in terms both of properties and manufacture, as part-way between non-hydraulic lime and Portland cement. The limestone used contains sufficient quantities of clay and/or silica. The resultant product will contain dicalcium silicate but unlike Portland cement not tricalcium silicate.

It is slaked enough to convert the calcium oxide to calcium hydroxide but not with sufficient water to react with the dicalcium silicate. It is this dicalcium silicate which in combination with water provides the setting properties of hydraulic lime.

Aluminium and magnesium also produce a hydraulic set, and some pozzolans contain these elements.

There are three strength grades for natural hydraulic lime, laid down in the European Norm EN459; NHL2, NHL3.5 and NHL5. The numbers stand for the minimum compressive strength at 28 days in newtons per square millimeter (N/mm^{2}). For example, the NHL 3.5 strength ranges from 3.5 N/mm^{2} (510 psi) to 10 N/mm^{2} (1,450 psi). These are similar to the old classification of feebly hydraulic, moderately hydraulic and eminently hydraulic, and although different, some people continue to refer to them interchangeably. The terminology for hydraulic lime mortars was improved by the skilled French civil engineer Louis Vicat in the 1830s from the older system of water limes and feebly, moderately and eminently. Vicat published his work following research of the use of lime mortars whilst building bridges and roads in his work. The French company Vicat still currently produce natural cements and lime mortars. Names of lime mortars were so varied and conflicting across the European continent that the reclassification has greatly improved the understanding and use of lime mortars.

== Mix ==
Traditional lime mortar is a combination of lime putty and aggregate (usually sand). A typical modern lime mortar mix would be 1 part lime putty to 3 parts washed, well graded, sharp sand. Other materials have been used as aggregate instead of sand. The theory is that the voids of empty space between the sand particles account for 1/3 of the volume of the sand. The lime putty, when mixed at a 1:3 ratio, fills these voids to create a compact mortar. Analysis of mortar samples from historic buildings typically indicates a higher ratio of around 1 part lime putty to 1.5 part aggregate/sand was commonly used. This equates to approximately 1 part dry quicklime to 3 parts sand. A traditional coarse plaster mix also had horse hair added for reinforcing and control of shrinkage, important when plastering to wooden laths and for base (or dubbing) coats onto uneven surfaces such as stone walls where the mortar is often applied in thicker coats to compensate for the irregular surface levels.

If shrinkage and cracking of the lime mortar does occur this can be as a result of either

- The sand being poorly graded or with a particle size that is too small
- The mortar being applied too thickly (Thicker coats increase the possibility of shrinkage, cracking and slumping)
- Too much suction from the substrate
- High air temperatures or direct sunlight which force dry the mortar
- High water content in the lime mortar mix
- Poor quality or unmatured lime putty

A common method for mixing lime mortar with powdered lime is as follows:

- Gather ingredients, sand, lime, and water
- Measure out ratio of sand to lime, for example 3 buckets of sand, and 1 bucket of lime for a 3:1 ratio.
- Mix the dry ingredients thoroughly so all the sand is coated with lime, and there are neither chunks of sand or lime visible.
- Reserve some portion of the dry ingredients by removing it from the mixing vessel. The amount reserved can vary, but a safe starting point is about 1/4 of the batch. This will be added in later to fine tune the dryness of the mix.
- Measure out water. How much depends on how wet one wants the mix to be, and how damp/wet the sand is. A good starting point is 1 quart of water per gallon of sand.
- Add about 2/3 of the water to the dry ingredients and mix until even consistency.
- Add the reserved dry ingredients and/or the remaining water to get a preferred mix. It takes time to know what works well, and the recipe can change depending on the temperature, humidity, moisture in the sand, type of brick, and task at hand (laying brick may warrant a wetter mix, while pointing may require a drier one.
- To test the mix as one is making it, one can use a trowel, or pat the mortar with one's hand to see how much moisture and "cream" come to the surface.
- Remember to thoroughly wet the brick prior to using lime mortar. Old brick can be extremely porous, a 4-pound (1.8 kg) brick can hold a 1 imperial pint (0.57 L) of water. The bricks should be saturated, but dry on the surface prior to laying or pointing. Excess water can cause the lime to run and leave streaks.

=== Hair or fiber reinforcement ===
Hair reinforcement is common in lime plaster and many types of hair and other organic fibres can be found in historic plasters. However, organic material in lime will degrade in damp environments particularly on damp external renders. This problem has given rise to the use of polypropylene fibres in new lime renders

=== Properties ===
- Lime mortar is not as strong in compression as Portland cement based mortar, but both are sufficiently strong for construction of non-high-rise domestic properties.
- Lime mortar does not adhere as strongly to masonry as Portland cement. This is an advantage with softer types of masonry, where use of cement in many cases eventually results in cement pulling away some masonry material when it reaches the end of its life. The mortar is a sacrificial element which should be weaker than the bricks so it will crack before the bricks. It is less expensive to replace cracked mortar than cracked bricks.
- Under cracking conditions, Portland cement breaks, whereas lime often produces numerous microcracks if the amount of movement is small. These microcracks recrystallise through the action of 'free lime' effectively self-healing the affected area.
- Historic buildings are frequently constructed with relatively soft masonry units (e.g. soft brick and many types of stone), and minor movement in such buildings is quite common due to the nature of the foundations. This movement breaks the weakest part of the wall, and with Portland cement mortar this is usually the masonry. When lime mortar is used, the lime is the weaker element, and the mortar cracks in preference to the masonry. This results in much less damage, and is relatively simple to repair.
- Lime mortar is more porous than cement mortars, and it wicks any dampness in the wall to the surface where it evaporates. Thus any salt content in the water crystallises on the lime, damaging the lime and thus saving the masonry. Cement, on the other hand, evaporates water less than soft brick, so damp issues are liable to cause salt formation and spalling on brick surfaces and consequent disintegration of bricks. This damp evaporation ability is widely referred to as 'breathability'.
- Lime mortar should not be used below temperatures of 5 °C (41 °F) and takes longer to set so it should be protected from freezing for three months. Because of its faster set, hydraulic lime may not need as much time before freezing temperatures begin.

Usually any dampness in the wall will cause the lime mortar to change colour, indicating the presence of moisture. The effect will create an often mottled appearance of a limewashed wall. As the moisture levels within a wall alter, so will the shade of a limewash. The darker the shade of limewash, the more pronounced this effect will become.

A load of mixed lime mortar may be allowed to sit as a lump for some time, without it drying out (it may get a thin crust). When ready to use, this lump may be remixed ('knocked up') again and then used. Traditionally on building sites, prior to the use of mechanical mixers, the lime putty (slaked on site in a pit) was mixed with sand by a labourer who would "beat and ram" the mix with a "larry" (a wide hoe with large holes). This was then covered with sand and allowed to sit for a while (from days to weeks) - a process known as "banking". This lump was then remixed and used as necessary. This process cannot be done with Portland cement.

== Lime with Portland cement ==
The combination of Portland cement and lime is used for stabilization and solidification of the ground through establishing of lime cement columns or stabilization of the entire upper mass volume. The method provides an increase in strength when it comes to vibrations, stability and settling. When building e.g. roads and railways, the method is more common and widespread (Queen Eufemias street in Central Oslo, E18 at Tønsberg etc.).

For preservation purposes, Type N and Type O mortars are often used. A Type N mortar is 1 part Portland, 1 part Lime and 6 parts sand or other aggregate (1:1:6). A Type O mortar is 1 part Portland, 2 parts Lime and 9 parts sand or other aggregate (1:2:9). Straight lime mortar has no Portland, and 1 part Lime to 3 parts sand or other aggregate. The addition of cement or other pozzolan to decrease cure times is referred to as “gauging”. Other than Portland, ash and brick dust have been used to gauge mortars.

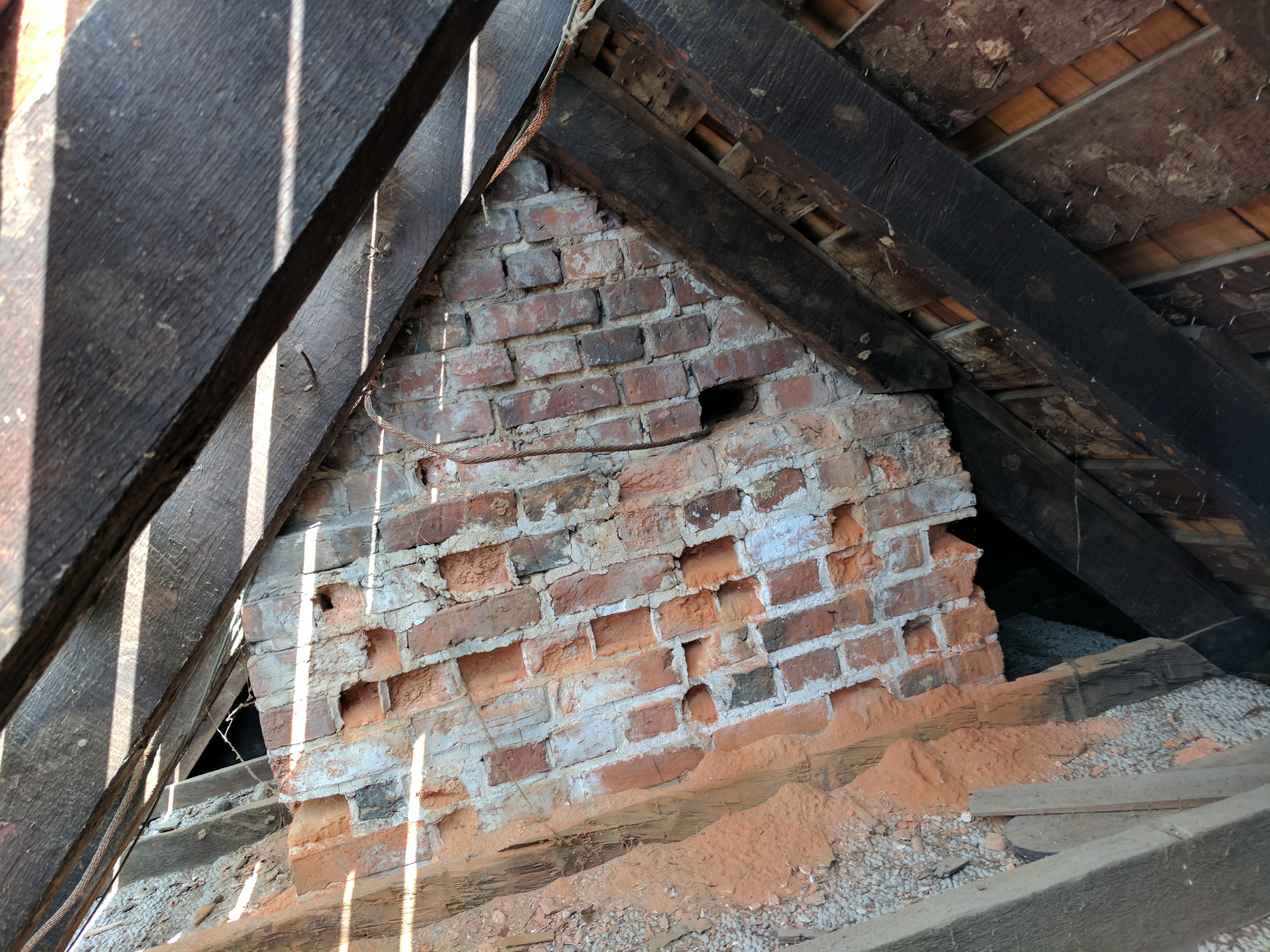
Spalling of brick in an 18th century chimney. The lower section is older than the upper. Note that the while the lower mortar is deteriorated, it is not as bad as the brick.

For historic restoration purposes, and restoration work involving repointing or brick replacement, masons must discover the original brick and mortar and repair it with a similar material. The National Park Service provides guidance for proper masonry repointing through Preservation Brief 2. In general, Brief 2 suggests that repointing should be done with a similar or weaker mortar. Therefore, a straight lime mortar joint should be repointed in kind. Due to the popularity of Portland cement, this often is not the case. A wall system needs a balance between the mortar and brick that allows the mortar to be the weak part of the unit.

When mortar is stronger than the brick, it prevents any natural movement in the wall, and the faces of the brick will begin to deteriorate. This is a process known as spalling, in which the outer face of a brick degrades and can flake off or turn to powder. There is also a natural movement of water through a masonry wall. A strong Portland cement mix will prevent a free flow of water from a moist to dry area. This can cause rising damp to be trapped within the wall and create system failures. If moisture cannot evaporate into the air, it will accumulate and cause damage to a wall structure. Water freezing in the wall is another cause of spalling.

In restoration work of pre-20th century structures, there should be a high ratio of lime and aggregate to Portland. This reduces the compressive strength of the mortar but allows the wall system to function better. The lime mortar acts as a wick that helps to pull water from the brick. This can help to prevent the older brick from spalling. Even when the brick is a modern, harder element, repointing with a higher ratio lime mortar may help to reduce rising damp.

It may not be advisable for all consumers to use a straight lime mortar. With no Portland in the mix, there is less control over the setting of the mortar. In some cases, a freeze thaw cycle will be enough to create failure in the mortar joint. Straight lime mortar can also take a long time to fully cure and therefore work needs to be performed at a time of year where the weather conditions are conducive to the mortar setting properly. Those conditions are not only above freezing temperatures but also drier seasons. To protect the slow curing mortar from damp, a siloxane can be added to the surface. With historic structures, this may be a controversial strategy as it could have a detrimental effect to the historic fabric.

The presence of Portland allows for a more stable mortar. The stability and predictability make the mixed mortar more user friendly, particularly in applications where entire wall sections are being laid. Contractors and designers may prefer mixes that contain Portland due to the increased compressive strength over a straight lime mortar. As many pre-Portland mix buildings are still standing and have original mortar, the arguments for greater compressive strength and ease of use may be more a result of current practice and a lack of understanding of older techniques.

== See also ==
- Energetically modified cement
- Hempcrete
- Plastering
- Sticky rice mortar
- Whitewash
