= List of protected areas of Taiwan =

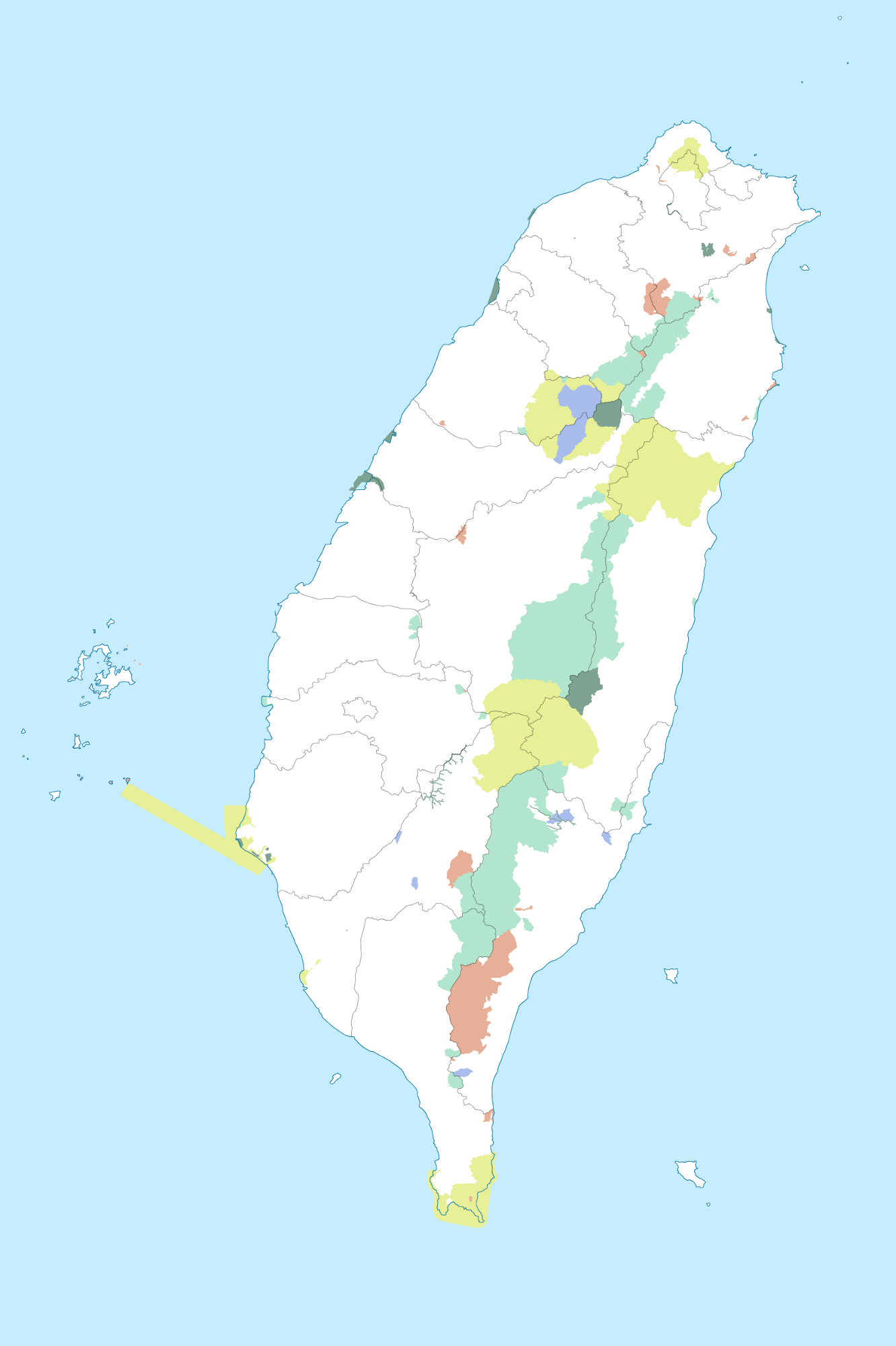
Protected areas of Taiwan National Parks Nature Reserves Wildlife Refuges Major Wildlife Habitats Forest Reserves

There are 92 protected areas of Taiwan. Together they cover an area of 7,146 km^{2}, or 19.72% of Taiwan's land area. Protected areas are classed as national parks, nature reserves, forest reserves, major wildlife habitats, and wildlife refuges.

== National parks ==
National parks are managed by the National Park Service. They are IUCN protected area category II.

- Dongsha National Park 3600.32 km^{2}, est. 2007
- Kenting National Park 329.27 km^{2}, est. 1984
- Kinmen National Park 36.32 km^{2}, est. 1995
- Shei-pa National Park 769.59 km^{2}, est. 1992
- Taijiang National Park 47.38 km^{2}, est. 2009
- Taroko National Park 980.40 km^{2}, est. 1986
- Yangmingshan National Park 113.66 km^{2}, est. 1985
- Yushan National Park 1031.21 km^{2}, est. 1985

== Nature reserves ==
Nature reserves are managed by the Forestry and Nature Conservation Agency. They are IUCN protected area category Ia.

- Alishan Taiwan Pleione Nature Reserve 0.58 km^{2}, est. 1992
- Chatianshan Nature Reserve 79.74 km^{2}, est. 1992
- Chuyunshan Nature Reserve 60.42 km^{2}, est. 1992
- Danshuei River Mangrove Nature Reserve 1.16 km^{2}, est. 1986
- Dawu Working Circle Taiwan Amentotaxus Nature Reserve 0.84 km^{2}, est. 1986
- Dawushan Nature Reserve 478.48 km^{2}, est. 1988
- Guandu Nature Reserve 0.48 km^{2}, est. 1986
- Hapen Nature Reserve 3.20 km^{2}, est. 1986
- Hokutolite Nature Reserve 0.002 km^{2}, est. 2013
- Jiujiu Peaks Nature Reserve 12.06 km^{2}, est. 2000
- Kenting Uplifted Coral Reefs Nature Reserve 1.33 km^{2}, est. 1994
- Miaoli Sanyi Huoyanshan Nature Reserve 2.2 km^{2}, est. 1986
- Nan-ao Broad-leaved Forest Nature Reserve 1.84 km^{2}, est. 1992
- Penghu Columnar Basalt Nature Reserve 0.37 km^{2}, est. 1992
- Pinglin Taiwan Keteleeria Nature Reserve 13.6 km^{2}, est. 1986
- Taitung Hongye Village Taitung Cycas Nature Reserve 3.17 km^{2}, est. 1986
- Wazihwei Nature Reserve 0.14 km^{2}, est. 1994
- Wushanding Mud Volcano Nature Reserve 0.04 km^{2}, est. 1992
- Wushihbi Coastal Nature Reserve 3.54 km^{2}, est. 1994
- Xuhai-Guanyinbi Nature Reserve 8.38 km^{2}, est. 2012
- Yuanyang Lake Nature Reserve 3.71 km^{2}, est. 1986

== Forest reserves ==
Forest reserves are managed by the Forestry and Nature Conservation Agency. They are IUCN protected area category IV unless otherwise noted.

- Coastal Range Taitung Cycas Forest Reserve 8 km^{2}, est. 2006
- Dawu Taiwan Keteleeria Forest Reserve 12.76 km^{2}, est. 2006
- Guangshan Formosan Date Palm Forest Reserve 23.89 km^{2}, est. 2006
- Jia-xian Sih-de Fossil Forest Reserve 4.48 km^{2}, est. 2006 (IUCN category III)
- Shih-ba-luo-han-shan Forest Reserve 6.39 km^{2}, est. 2006 (IUCN category III)
- Xue-ba Forest Reserve 208.7 km^{2}, est. 2006 (IUCN category not reported)

== Major wildlife habitats ==
Major wildlife habitats are managed by the Forestry and Nature Conservation Agency. They are IUCN protected area category IV.

- Chachayalaishan Major Wildlife Habitat 20.07 km^{2}, est. 2000
- Chayi County Aogu Major Wildlife Habitat 6.61 km^{2}, est. 2009
- Ci-lan Major Wildlife Habitat 565.48 km^{2}, est. 2000
- Coastal Mountain Range Major Wildlife Habitat 32.71 km^{2}, est. 2000
- Dadu River Mouth Major Wildlife Habitat 31.50 km^{2}, est. 1998
- Danda Major Wildlife Habitat 1212.14 km^{2}, est. 2000
- Feitsui Reservoir Snake-eating (Yellow-margined Box) Turtle Major Wildlife Habitat 12.92 km^{2}, est. 2013
- Guanshan Major Wildlife Habitat 694.42 km^{2}, est. 2000
- Guanwu Broad-tailed Swallowtail Major Wildlife Habitat 3.51 km^{2}, est. 2000
- Guanyin Coast Major Wildlife Habitat 5.21 km^{2}, est. 2000
- Huaping Islet Major Wildlife Habitat 0.007 km^{2}, est. 1995
- Jin-shuei-ying Major Wildlife Habitat 11.3 km^{2}, est. 2000
- Kaohsiung County Sanmin Township Nanzixian River Major Wildlife Habitat 1.78 km^{2}, est. 1998
- Keya River Mouth and Sianshan Wetland Major Wildlife Habitat 14.22 km^{2}, est. 2001
- Li-jia Major Wildlife Habitat 10.30 km^{2}, est. 2000
- Lulinshan Major Wildlife Habitat 4.9 km^{2}, est. 2000
- Matsu islands Major Wildlife Habitat 1 km^{2}, est. 1999
- Mianhua Islet Major Wildlife Habitat 0.22 km^{2}, est. 1995
- Penghu County Mao Islet Major Wildlife Habitat 0.37 km^{2}, est. 1997
- Ruei-yan River Major Wildlife Habitat 27.57 km^{2}, est. 2000
- Shuang-guei Lake Major Wildlife Habitat 489.03 km^{2}, est. 2000
- Shuei-lian Major Wildlife Habitat 3.39 km^{2}, est. 2001
- Syue-shan-keng River Major Wildlife Habitat 6.72 km^{2}, est. 2000
- Taichung County Gaomei Major Wildlife Habitat 7.35 km^{2}, est. 2004
- Taichung County Wuling Formosan Landlocked Salmon Major Wildlife Habitat 72.22 km^{2}, est. 1995
- Tainan City Sicao Major Wildlife Habitat 5.43 km^{2}, est. 2006
- Tainan County Zengwen River Mouth Major Wildlife Habitat 3.2 km^{2}, est. 2002
- Taipei City Zhongxing and Yungfu Bridges Waterbird Major Wildlife Habitat 1.61 km^{2}, est. 1997
- Taitung County Haiduan Township Xinwulu River Major Wildlife Habitat 1.93 km^{2}, est. 1998
- Taoyuan Gaorong Major Wildlife Habitat 0.01 km^{2}, est. 2011
- Taoyuan Guan-Xin Algal Reefs Ecosystem Major Wildlife Habitat 3.15 km^{2}, est. 2014
- Tashan Major Wildlife Habitat 7.41 km^{2}, est.2001
- Yilan County Lanyang River Mouth Waterbird Major Wildlife Habitat 2.06 km^{2}, est. 1996
- Yilan County Shuang-lian-Pi Major Wildlife Habitat 7.5 km^{2}, est. 2005
- Yilan County Wuweigang Major Wildlife Habitat 1.14 km^{2}, est. 2014
- Yuli Major Wildlife Habitat 114.12 km^{2}, est. 2000
- Yunlin Huben Fairy Pitta Major Wildlife Habitat 17.38 km^{2}, est. 2008

== Wildlife refuges ==
Wildlife refuges are managed by the Forestry and Nature Conservation Agency. They are IUCN protected area category IV.

- Caomei Wetlands Wildlife Refuge 7.35 km^{2}, est. 2004
- Dadu River Mouth Wildlife Refuge 26.7 km^{2}, est. 1995
- Feitsui Reservoir Snake-eating (Yellow-margined Box) Turtle Wildlife Refuge 12.92 km^{2}, est. 2013
- Formosan Landlocked Salmon Refuge 72.22 km^{2}, est. 1997
- Hsinchu City Coastal Wildlife Refuge 14.22 km^{2}, est. 2001
- Hsinwulue River Wildlife Refuge 1.93 km^{2}, est. 1998
- Kaohsiung County Sanmin Township Nanzhxian River Wildlife Refuge 1.78 km^{2}, est. 1993
- Lanyang River Mouth Waterbird Refuge 2.07 km^{2}, est. 1996
- Matsu Islands Tern Refuge 1 km^{2}, est. 2000
- Mianhua and Huaping Islets Wildlife Refuge 0.23 km^{2}, est. 1996
- Penghu County Mao Islet Seabird Refuge 0.37825 km^{2}, est. 1991
- Penghu County Wang-an Island Green Turtle Nesting Refuge 7.54 km^{2}, est. 1995
- Tainan City Sicao Wildlife Refuge 5.43 km^{2}, est. 1994
- Tainan County Zengwen River Mouth North Bank Black-faced Spoonbill Refuge 3.2 km^{2}, est. 2002
- Taipei City Waterbird Refuge 1.61 km^{2}, est. 1993
- Taoyuan Gaorong Wildlife Refuge 0.01 km^{2}, est. 2012
- Taoyuan Guanxin Algal Reefs Ecosystem Wildlife Refuge 3.15 km^{2}, est. 2014
- Wuweigang Waterbird Refuge 1.03 km^{2}, est. 1998
- Yilan County Shuang-lian-pi Wildlife Refuge 0.17 km^{2}, est. 2003
- Yuli Wildlife Refuge 114.12 km^{2}, est. 2000
