= YSNP =

YSNP can refer to:

- Yellowstone National Park, in Wyoming, United States.
- Yushan National Park in Taiwan
- "You Shall Not Pass", a famous quote from Gandalf during his battle with a balrog in The Lord of the Rings
