= Paiyun Lodge =

Alpine lodge in Taiwan

- 排雲山莊 (Pái yǘn shān zhuāng)
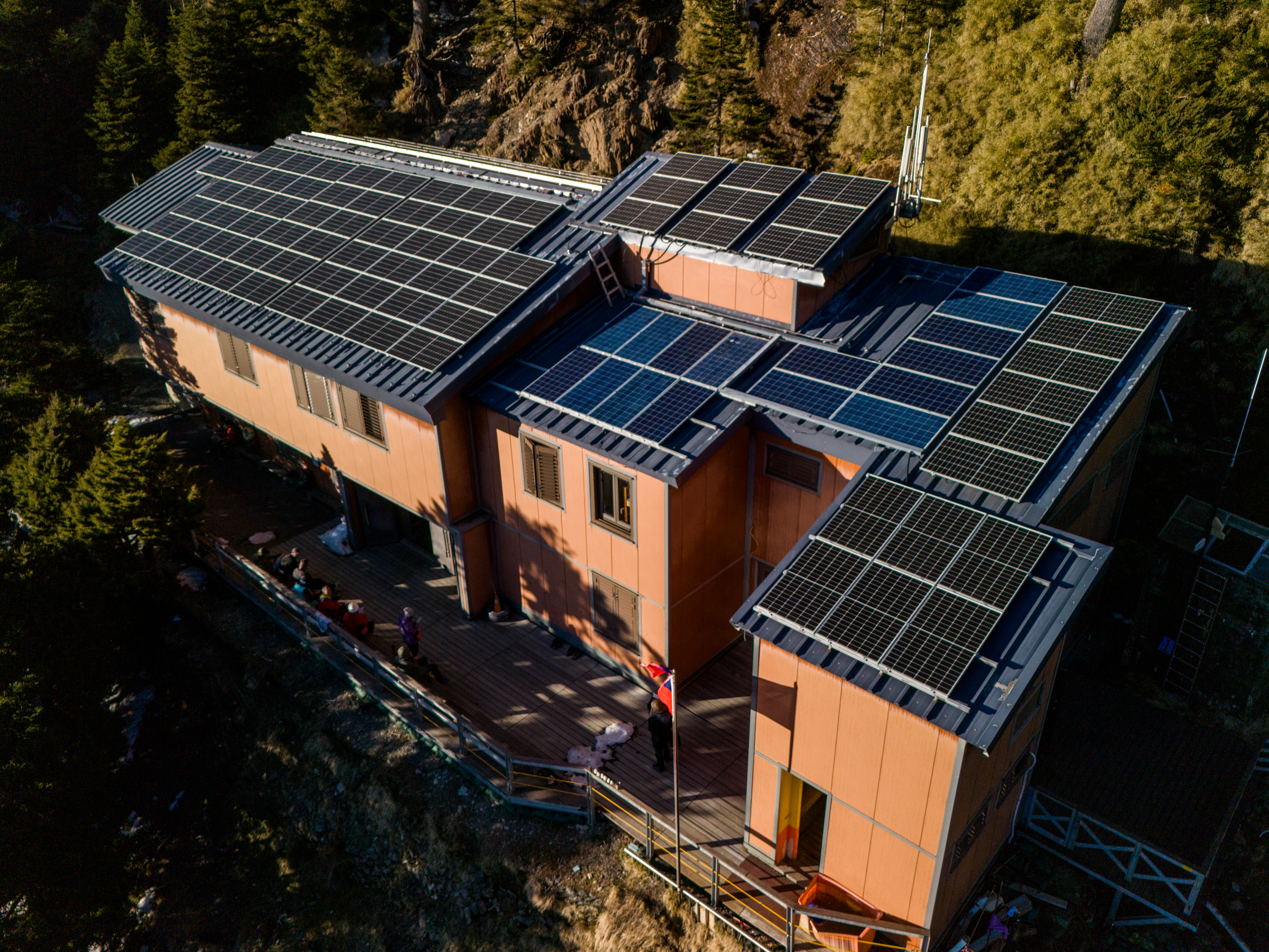
- Paiyun Lodge (2025)
- Interactive map of the Paiyun Lodge area

General information
- Status: Completed
- Type: Two-story steel frame structure
- Classification: Alpine accommodation
- Location: Yushan National Park, "No. 101 Paiyun" in the 6th neighborhood of Jhongshan Village, Alishan Township, Chiayi County, Taiwan
- Coordinates: 23°27′59.77″N 120°56′58.83″E
- Elevation: 3,402 metres (11,161 ft)
- Years built: 1943 (1st); 1967 (2nd); 2000 (3rd); 2010–2013 (4th)
- Construction started: 2010; 16 years ago
- Completed: June 2013; 13 years ago
- Opened: 5 July 2013; 13 years ago
- Landlord: Chiayi Branch, Forestry and Nature Conservation Agency

Design and construction
- Known for: The most famous and popular mountain lodge in Taiwan

Other information
- Number of restaurants: 1
- Facilities: Accommodation capacity 116 people, water supply, public toilets, solar power system, lithium-ion battery energy storage system
- Parking: No
- Public transit: No

Paiyun Lodge (traditional Chinese: 排雲山莊; simplified Chinese: 排云山庄; pinyin: Pái yǘn shān zhuāng) is an accommodation mountain lodge in Taiwan's Yushan National Park, with an altitude of 3,402 metres (11,161 ft) and located 2.4 kilometres (1.5 mi) below the west slope of the main peak of Yushan (Mt. Jade). This is the most famous and popular mountain lodge in Taiwan. Hikers come here to rest and stay before climbing the peaks of Yushan Mountain. Due to extreme popularity, a lottery is required for this accommodation. The winning rate has been recorded as low as 1%. Since January 2002, Paiyun Lodge was originally operated and managed by the Forestry Bureau, but has now been fully managed by the Yushan National Park Headquarters. Today, the appearance of Paiyun Lodge is a two-story steel frame structure after the renovation was completed in June 2013. In terms of energy system, a solar power supply system is installed on the roof, and a lithium-ion battery energy storage system is installed.

== Names ==
Paiyun Lodge was called Singaosia during the Japanese colonial period. As the name suggests, it was at the foot of Singaoshan (Singaoshan means new high mountain). According to information from the Yushan National Park Headquarters, the predecessor of Paiyun Lodge was the last resting place before the Japanese-built "New High Mountain Climbing Trail" in 1926 and named it "Singaoshan Resting Place". In 1934, in response to the increasing number climbers, the Japanese government converted it into a police station and called it the "Singaoshan Station". This is enough to prove that its predecessor was not a work dormitory. The Japanese government was defeated and surrendered in 1945. After the Nationalist government took over the original "Singaoshan Station", the police were no longer stationed there. In 1967, it was transferred to the Forestry Bureau and was converted into a mountain lodge for mountaineers to stay. It was named "Paiyun Lodge" because of the overwhelming beauty of the sea of clouds.

== Location ==
Paiyun Lodge is located in Jhongshan Village, Alishan Township, Chiayi County, Taiwan. It is close to the east of Chiayi County and close to the main peak of Yushan (Mt. Jade). In terms of the mileage of the Yushan Mountain Hiking Trail, Paiyun Lodge is 2.4 kilometres (1.5 mi) away from the main peak of Mt. Jade and 8.5 kilometres (5.3 mi) away from the Tataka Trailhead. It is the last accommodation before climbing to the summit.

== History ==
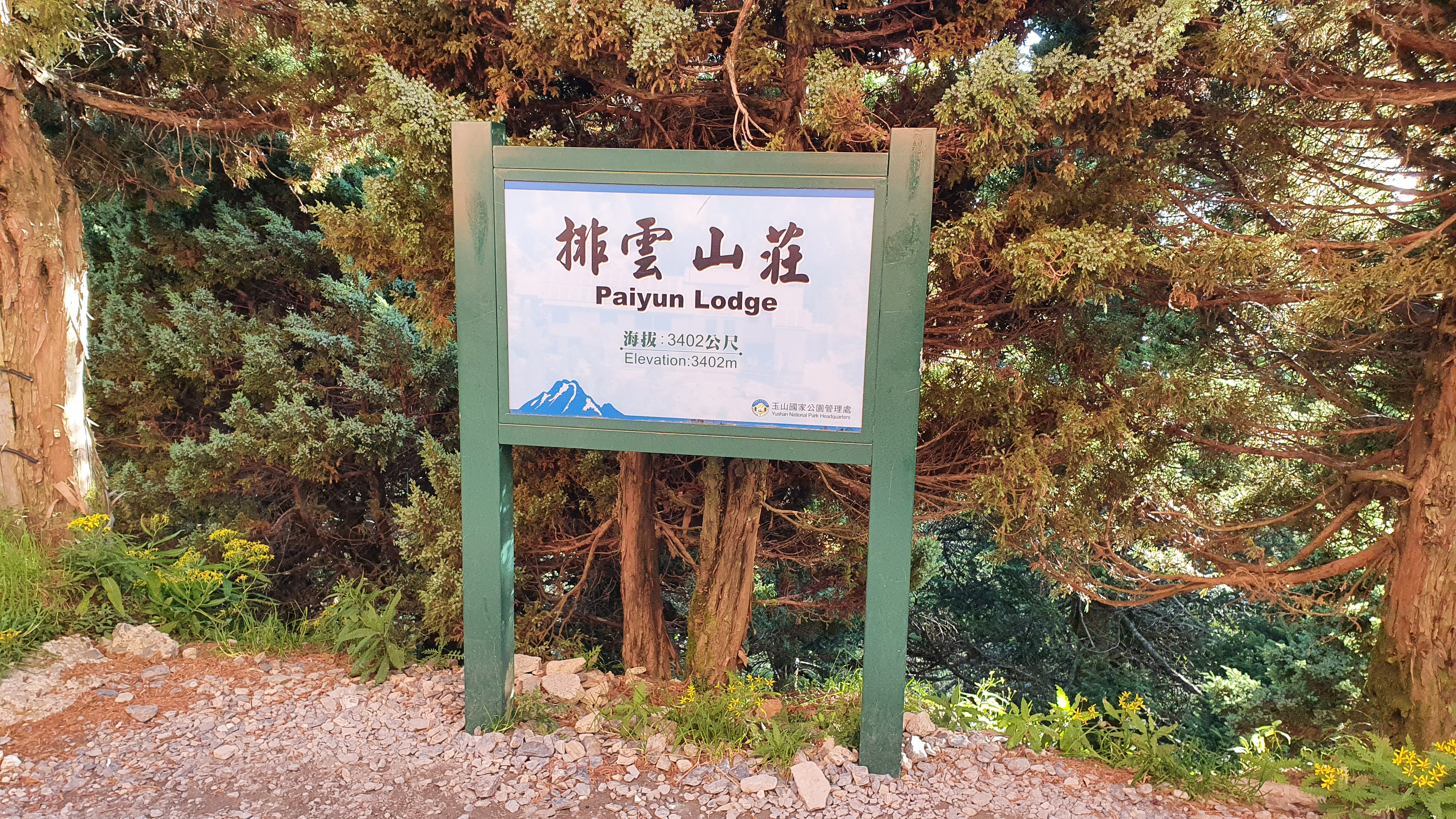
Paiyun Lodge Notice Board Paiyun Lodge is located at an altitude of 3,402 metres (11,161 ft) above sea level and is operated and managed by the Yushan National Park Headquarters.

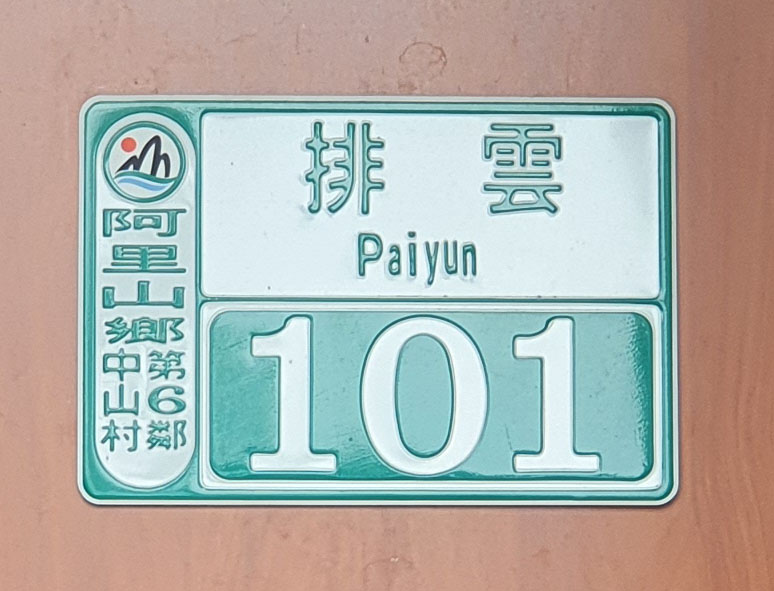
The address plate of Paiyun Lodge Paiyun Lodge officially hung the house sign at 3:00 pm on October 18, 2007. "No. 101 Paiyun" in the sixth neighborhood of Jhongshan Village, Alishan Township, Chiayi County".

During the Japanese colonial period, Paiyun Lodge was a wooden garrison built in 1943. In 1945, Japan surrendered and the Nationalist government took over Taiwan and abolished the mountain garrison. In 1967, after the Forestry Bureau took over, a brick bungalow for accommodation was built on the original site of the garrison. It was designed to accommodate 60 people and was guarded and operated by an administrator. In 1998-99, the Forestry Bureau chose to build a toilet in the open space next to Paiyun Lodge in order to facilitate mountaineers to use the toilet. In September 2000, after renovation, Paiyun Lodge could accommodate 90 people. In January 2002, due to issues regarding the management rights and responsibilities of Paiyun Lodge, the Forestry Bureau transferred the management rights of Paiyun Lodge to the Yushan National Park Headquarters.

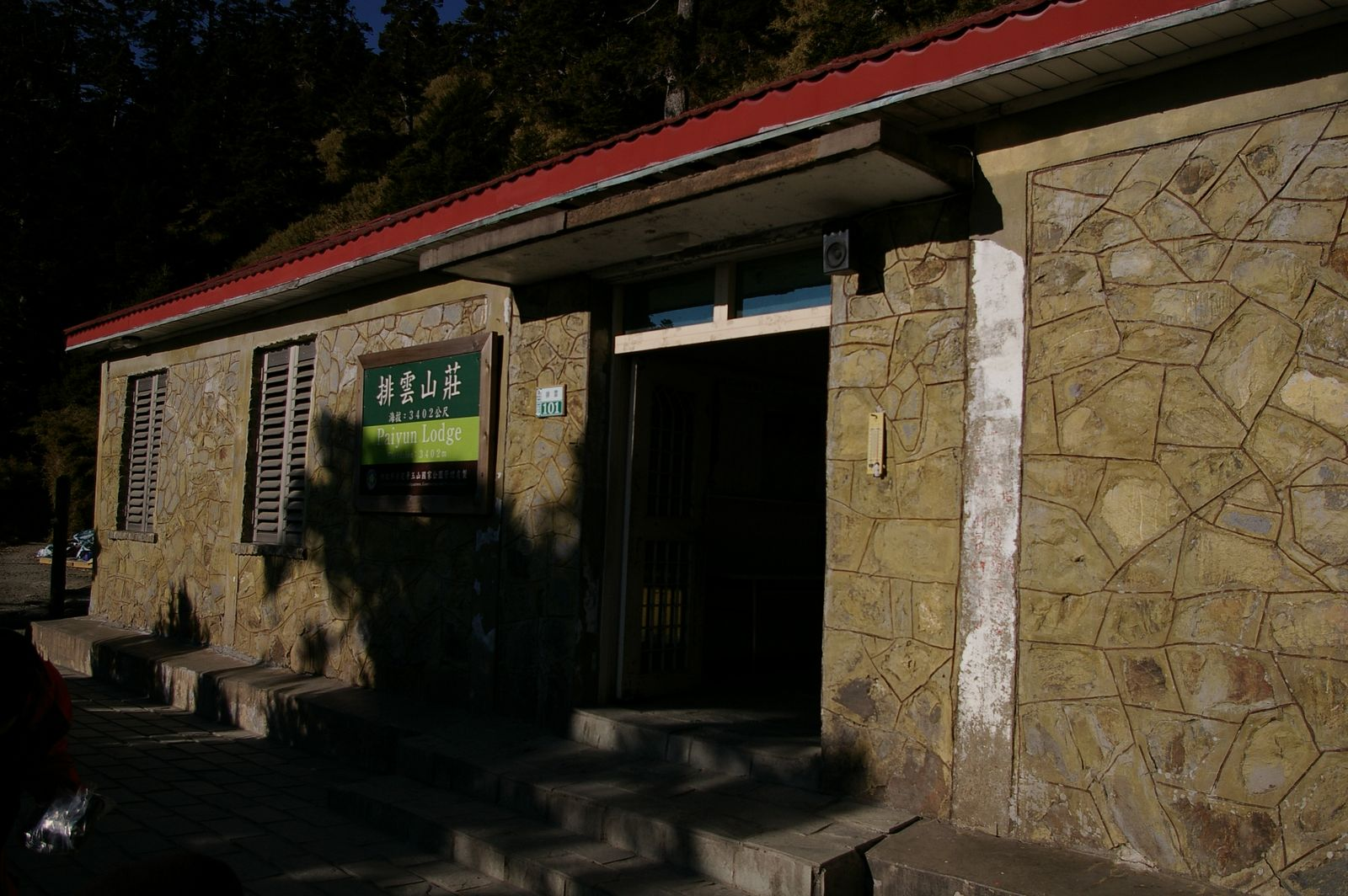
Paiyun Lodge (front view, 2005) In 1967, a brick bungalow was built for 60 people accommodation.

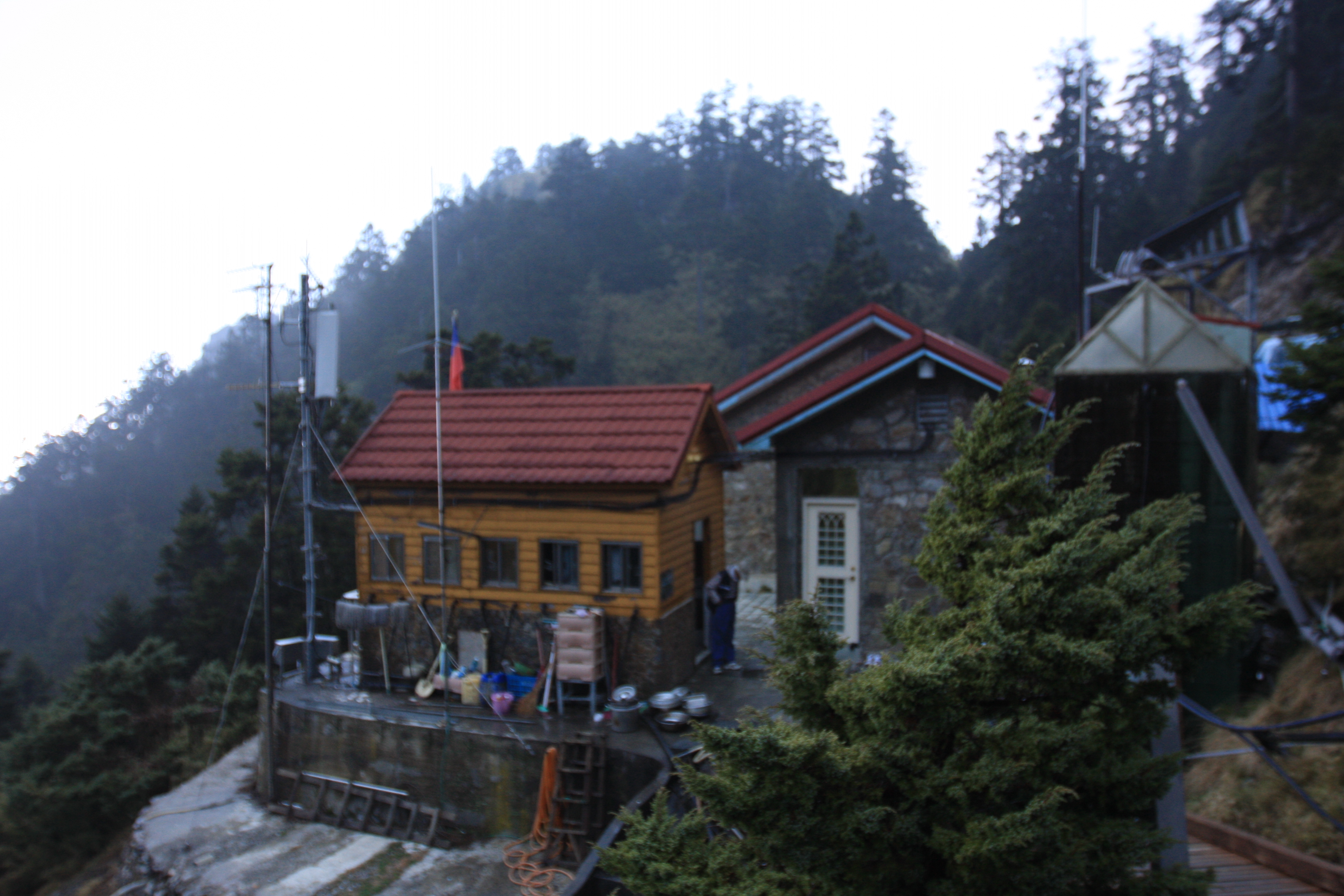
Toilet next to Paiyun Lodge (side view, 2008) In 1998-99, a toilet in the open space next to Paiyun Lodge was built.

In the early days, the household registration agency registered Paiyun Lodge in Syuefong Village, Wufong Township (now Alishan Township), Chiayi County. As Syuefong Village was merged into Jhongshan Village in 1987, due to operational errors, Paiyun Lodge was mistakenly registered in Dongpu Village, Xinyi Township, Nantou County. This condition has been going on since 1990 and was not discovered until 2007. After various relevant units met to make a resolution, the Yushan National Park Headquarters proposed to change the house address. Therefore, Paiyun Lodge officially hung the house sign at 3:00 pm on October 18, 2007. "No. 101 Paiyun" in the sixth neighborhood of Jhongshan Village, Alishan Township, Chiayi County".

On February 12, 2010, the Yushan National Park Headquarters announced: "Due to the poor equipment and lackluster functions of Paiyun Lodge, in order to improve service quality and maintain the local natural ecological environment, the existing Paiyun Lodge will be re-planned." The construction contract was officially awarded in 2010. Sanlian Fa Engineering Company was responsible for the construction, and Liancheng United Architects was responsible for designing the construction blueprint. After completion, the Paiyun Lodge will increase the original accommodation capacity from 82 people to 160 people, and the original bungalow building will be turned into a two-story building.

In June 2013, Paiyun Lodge was completed; the opening ceremony was held on July 5, and accommodation applications for Paiyun Lodge were resumed on July 20. The completed Paiyun Lodge is a two-story steel frame structure. The internal layout is to use the first floor as a restaurant and social hall, and the second floor as a dormitory for mountaineering accommodation: the dormitory adopts multi-compartment rooms, which are different from in the past (a collective bed). The accommodation environment could provide good accommodation quality. The power supply method adopts the solar power supply system on the roof to comply with the design of energy saving and carbon reduction. In addition, Paiyun Lodge provides services such as sleeping bag rentals and high-mountain medical care. It can also serve as a food supply relay station and mountain emergency rescue medical station in emergencies or critical situations to reduce the burden of carrying food and achieve the purpose of timely rescue, improving the survival rate of the injured and patients. Currently, Paiyun Lodge can accommodate about 116 people.

Brief building history of Paiyun Lodge
Year	Status	Building type	Accommodation capacity (people)	Manager	References
1943	Built	Wooden garrison	0 (Official use only)	Japanese government	
1967	Rebuilt	Brick bungalow	60	Forestry Bureau, Taiwan	
2000	Renovated	Brick bungalow	90	Forestry Bureau, Taiwan	
2013	Rebuilt	Two-story steel frame structure	116	Yushan National Park Headquarters, Taiwan	

== Energy and electric power systems ==
Energy supply in the high mountains remains an open question due to difficulties in connecting to the grid. In the past, lead-acid battery energy storage systems plus diesel generators were used in most early cases. However, the heavy metal lead pollution of lead-acid batteries is destructive to the environment and harmful to human health, causing serious problems when used in high mountains. Moreover, after a few years of use, lead-acid batteries will age and become unable to store electricity. Facing scrapping, the current disposal method for these discarded lead-acid batteries is to transport them down the mountain, otherwise there is no way to recycle them. Also because of the long-term accumulation of a large amount of waste lead-acid batteries, mountaineer Umi, who was later dubbed "Taiwan Sherpa", launched a "hero post" activity of carrying waste batteries down the mountain.

The Yushan National Park Headquarters planned to spend 100 to 200 million NTD in 2015 to transmit mains electricity from Tataka to Paiyun Lodge through an 8.5-kilometer-long wire (8.5 kilometres (5.3 mi)), and Wusiasyong Architects conducted a project evaluation and held discussions. However, environmental groups believe that this behavior seriously damages the mountain environment and violates the concept of national park conservation, and they have signed a petition to protest. So the plan was later abandoned and used solar energy to generate electricity.

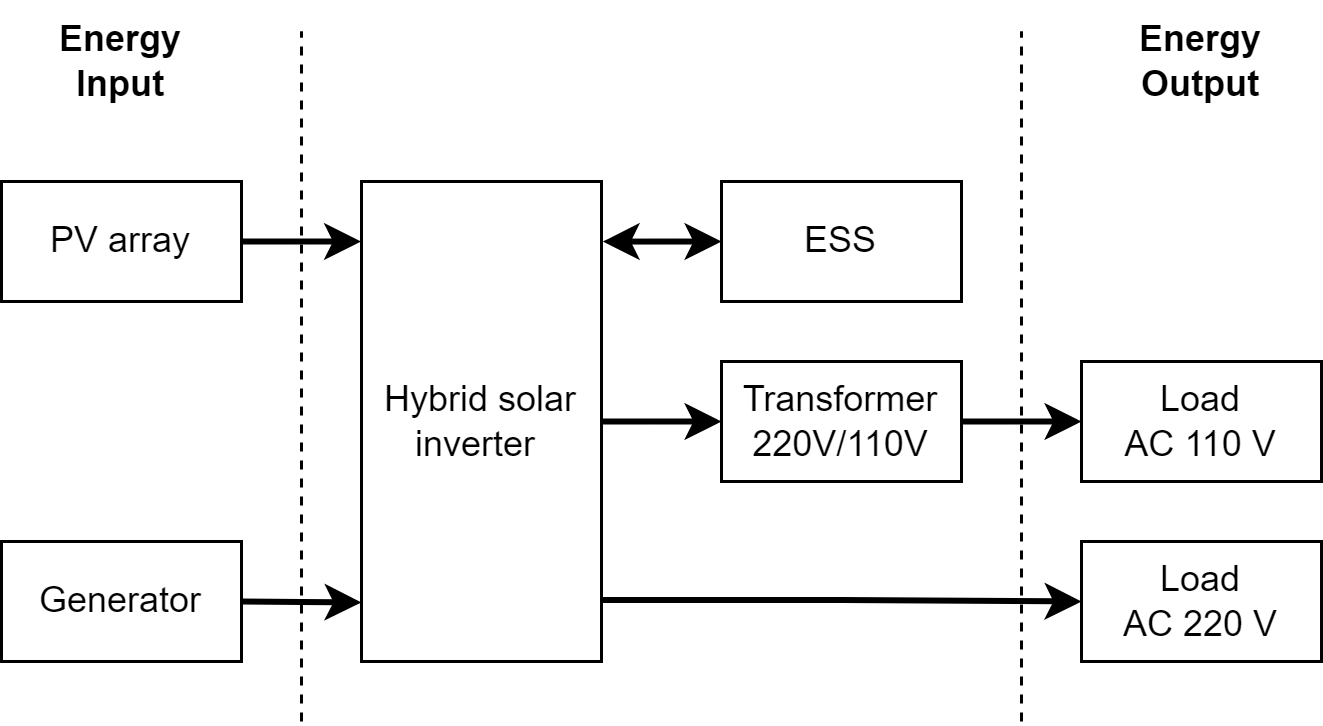
Energy Architecture of Paiyun Lodge. Energy input is provided in part by solar arrays and generators. The hybrid inverters directly supplies power to the lodge's 220V AC load. The power of the 110V AC load is obtained through a transformer (220V/110V). Energy storage systems (ESS) store and release intermittent renewable energy from solar arrays.

Currently, the use of lithium-ion battery energy storage systems combined with photovoltaic systems has been proven to be a more environmentally friendly way to solve the energy problems of the lodge. In 2016, Paiyun Lodge installed an off-grid photovoltaic system with a lithium-ion battery energy storage system. In this system, solar panels provide renewable energy, and a lithium-ion battery energy storage system is used as an energy storage system to deal with the intermittent power generation problem of renewable energy. In 2020, the Yushan National Park Headquarters launched a system aging assessment project for the long-term use of solar panels and energy storage systems. The report pointed out that the entire system is aging, but most systems remain healthy and can be used for a long time. In 2021, some repair and optimization suggestions were given. In 2022, Super Double Power Technology carried out system optimization for the old power system. Although the 2022 Taitung earthquakes (918 Strong Earthquake) were encountered during the construction period, various engineering projects were still successfully completed. This includes restructuring the energy storage system, restructuring the photovoltaic system, expanding the capacity of the inverter device, optimizing the power lines, installing a cloud energy management system, and establishing the current and future energy system architecture of Paiyun Lodge. In 2023, Super Double Power Technology carried out an expansion project on the energy storage system to increase the capacity of the energy storage system to cope with the dramatic changes in intermittent photovoltaic energy. C. J. Yan Architect & Associate served as the supervising unit for the project.

== Alpine transportation supplement ==
There are several main ways to transport alpine resources and equipment, such as manual handling, cable cars, and helicopters. For the route from Tataka Trailhead to Paiyun Lodge, since there is no cable car on this route, the main method of transportation in the past was manual transportation, while heavier machines or equipment would be transported by helicopter.

However, in the 2013 Yushan weather station air supply incident, the helicopter was overloaded and crashed into Yushan (Mt. Jade), killing three people. The air transportation and supply work was interrupted, and manual handling was used thereafter. The manual handling route is about 8.5 kilometres (5.3 mi) long from the Tataka Trailhead (elevation 2,610 metres (8,560 ft)) to Paiyun Lodge (elevation 3,402 metres (11,161 ft)).
