= Taijiang =

Taijiang may refer to:

- Taijiang County, in Guizhou, China
- Taijiang District, in Fuzhou, Fujian, China
- Taijiang National Park, national park in Tainan, Taiwan
