= National parks of Taiwan =

Protected areas in Taiwan

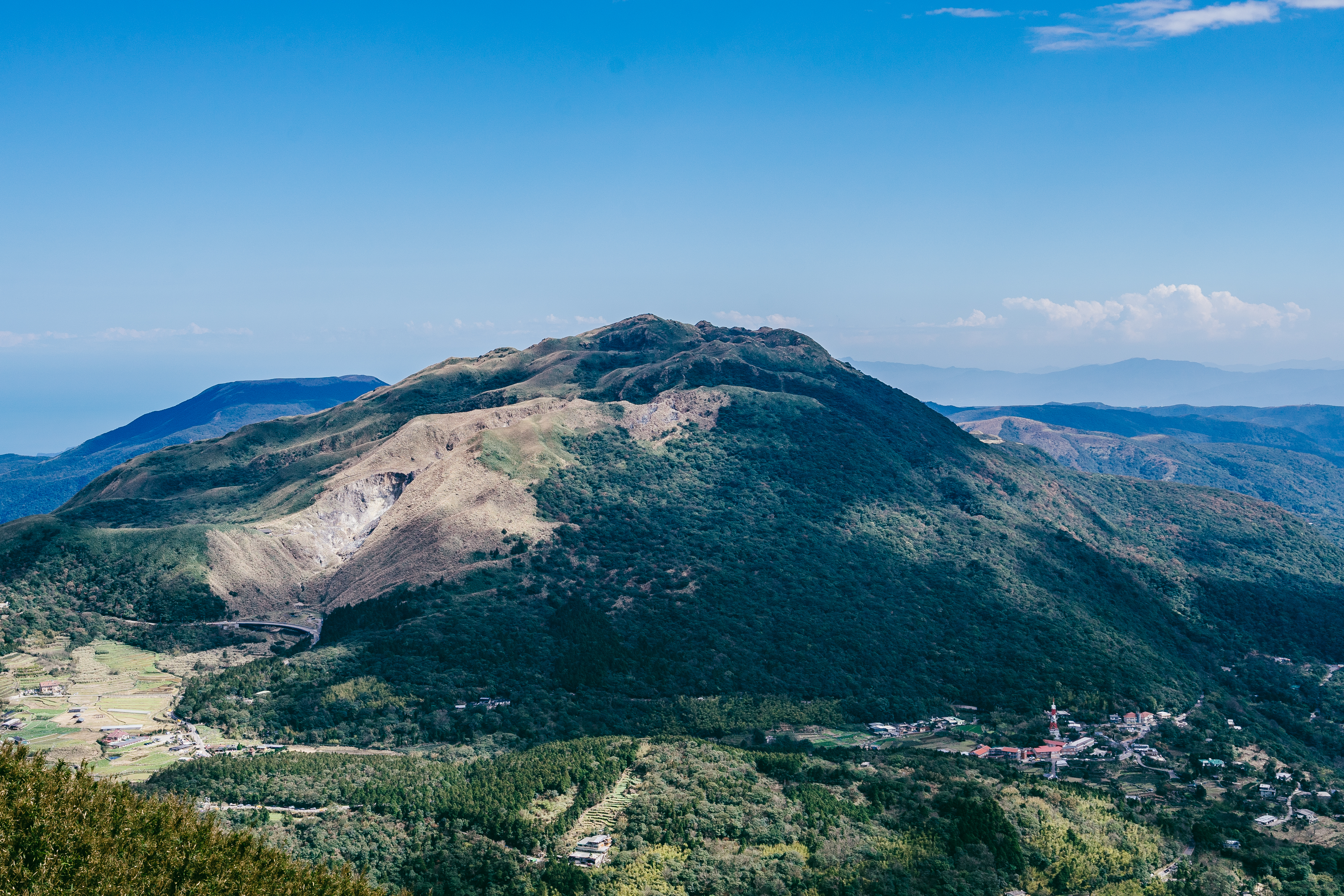
Yangmingshan National Park

Taiwan has 9 national parks and 1 national natural park, which are administered by the Ministry of the Interior.

National parks of Taiwan are protected spaces for the nature, wildlife, and history under the ministry's jurisdiction. The national parks cover 7,489.49 square kilometres (2,891.71 sq mi). The 3,103.76-square-kilometre (1,198.37 sq mi) total land area constitutes around 8.6% of the entire land area of the country. After World War II, calls for protecting the natural environment were met with opposition due to the prioritization of economic development. The National Park Law was passed in 1972, and the first national park was established in 1984.

National parks of Taiwan should not be confused with national scenic areas. While the national parks are administered by the National Park Service of the Ministry of the Interior, the national scenic areas are administered by the Tourism Bureau of the Ministry of Transportation and Communications. There are also different philosophies that govern the development of the two types of areas. For a national park, the emphasis is on the preservation of natural and cultural resources, with development for human utilization being a secondary priority.

== List of current national parks ==
Currently there are nine national parks in Taiwan. There is also one national nature park, which is designed for areas with fewer resources compared to a full national park.

Name	Chinese	Date established	Area	Description	Image
Kenting National Park	墾丁國家公園	January 1, 1984	332.90 km^{2} (82,261.4 acres), 180.84 km^{2} of land, and 152.06 km^{2} water	Located on the southern tip of Taiwan, it is also the oldest national park on Taiwan (Pingtung County). Kenting is famous for its tropical coral reefs and migratory birds.	
Yushan National Park	玉山國家公園	April 6, 1985	1,031.21 km^{2} (254,817.5 acres)	The largest national park in Taiwan, located on the central part of the island. It is named after Mount Jade (Yushan literally means "Jade Mountain") which is the highest peak in East Asia at 3,952 metres.	
Yangmingshan National Park	陽明山國家公園	September 16, 1985	113.38 km^{2} (28,016.8 acres)	The northernmost national park on the island of Taiwan; it has a volcanic landform. Yangmingshan is famous for its hotsprings and geothermal phenomenon. Each spring, Yangmingshan also has a dazzling flower season. It is located partially in Taipei City and partially in New Taipei City.	
Taroko National Park	太魯閣國家公園	November 28, 1986	920 km^{2} (227,337.0 acres)	A magnificent marble gorge cut by Liwu River, creating one of the most astounding landscapes in the world. It is also the home of the indigenous Truku people. Taroko is located in eastern Taiwan.	
Shei-Pa National Park	雪霸國家公園	July 1, 1992	768.5 km^{2} (189,900.5 acres)	Located in the northern central part of Taiwan island, in Hsinchu County and Miaoli County. It encompasses Xueshan (Snow Mountain), the second tallest mountain in Taiwan and East Asia, and Dabajian Mountain.	
Kinmen National Park	金門國家公園	October 18, 1995	35.29 km^{2} (8,720.3 acres)	Located on an island just off the coast of Mainland China, it includes famous historical battlefields in Kinmen. It is also known for its wetland ecosystem and traditional Fujian buildings that date back to the Ming Dynasty.	
Dongsha Atoll National Park	東沙環礁國家公園	October 4, 2007	3,536.68 km^{2} (873,932.7 acres), including 1.79 km^{2} of land	Taiwan's first marine national park. The atoll and the adjacent waters provide for a rich biodiversity of marine life including fish, jellyfish, squid, sicklefin lemon sharks, and rays to sea turtles, Dugongs, and cetaceans (dolphins and whales). Because of a strict protection policy, it is currently not open to public tourism.	
Taijiang National Park	臺江國家公園	December 28, 2009	393.1 km^{2} (97,137.1 acres), 49.05 km^{2} of land, and 344.05 km^{2} water	Located in southwest Taiwan on the coast of Tainan City. The park's tidal landscape is one of its most distinctive features. Around 200 years ago, a large part of the park was part of the Taijiang Inland Sea. There is a rich variety of marine life, including 205 species of shellfish, 240 species of fish and 49 crab species that thrive on the marshes of southern Taiwan.	
South Penghu Marine National Park	澎湖南方四島 國家公園	October 18, 2014	358.44 km^{2} (88,572.5 acres), including 3.70 km^{2} of land	Located in the south of the Penghu Islands. The seas around the islets feature large clusters of Acropora coral and a diversity of fish and shells living among the reefs. The islets are also known for magnificent basalt terrains and unique low-roofed houses built by early inhabitants with coral stone and basalt.	

=== National Nature Park ===
Name	Chinese	Date established	Area	Image
Shoushan National Nature Park	壽山國家自然公園	December 6, 2011	11.23 km^{2} (2,775.0 acres)	

== List of proposed national parks ==
Five other national parks were proposed but the plans of formation were halted due to opposition:

- 馬告檜木國家公園 ("Makauy National Park for Chamaecyparis formosensis", opposed by local indigenous peoples)
- 能丹國家公園("Neng-Dan National Park", opposed by the Bunun people)
- 蘭嶼國家公園 ("Ponso no Tao National Park", opposed by the Tao people)
- 綠島國家公園 ("Green Island National Park", opposed by the inhabitants.)
- 北方三島海洋國家公園 ("Three Northern Islets Marine National Park")

=== Proposed national nature park ===
Another national nature park was proposed but the plans of formation were halted due to opposition:

- 美濃國家自然公園 ("Meinong National Nature Park", opposed by some inhabitants.)

== List of 1937 historical parks ==
The first national parks were designated for establishment in 1937, when Taiwan was under Japanese rule, though never formally managed as such. The first national parks (國立公園, Kokuritsu Kōen) in Taiwan were planned on December 27, 1937, by Governor-General Seizō Kobayashi (小林躋造). This was when Taiwan was under Japanese rule, thus the three national parks were to be national parks of the Empire of Japan.

Name	Japanese	Taiwanese	Today's equivalent
Daiton National Park	大屯國立公園	Toā-tūn Kok-li̍p Kong-hn̂g	Yangmingshan National Park
Nītaka-Arisan National Park	新高阿里山國立公園	Sin-ko A-lí-san Kok-li̍p Kong-hn̂g	Yushan National Park and Alishan National Scenic Area
Tsugitaka-Taroko National Park	次高タロコ國立公園	Chhù-ko Thài-ló͘-koh Kok-li̍p Kong-hn̂g	Taroko National Park and Shei-Pa National Park

The legal basis for these national parks was no longer in force when Japan withdrew from Taiwan in 1945 after World War II. However, these planned national parks formed the basis for subsequent national park establishments.
