= South Penghu Marine National Park =

National park in Taiwan

- IUCN category II (national park)
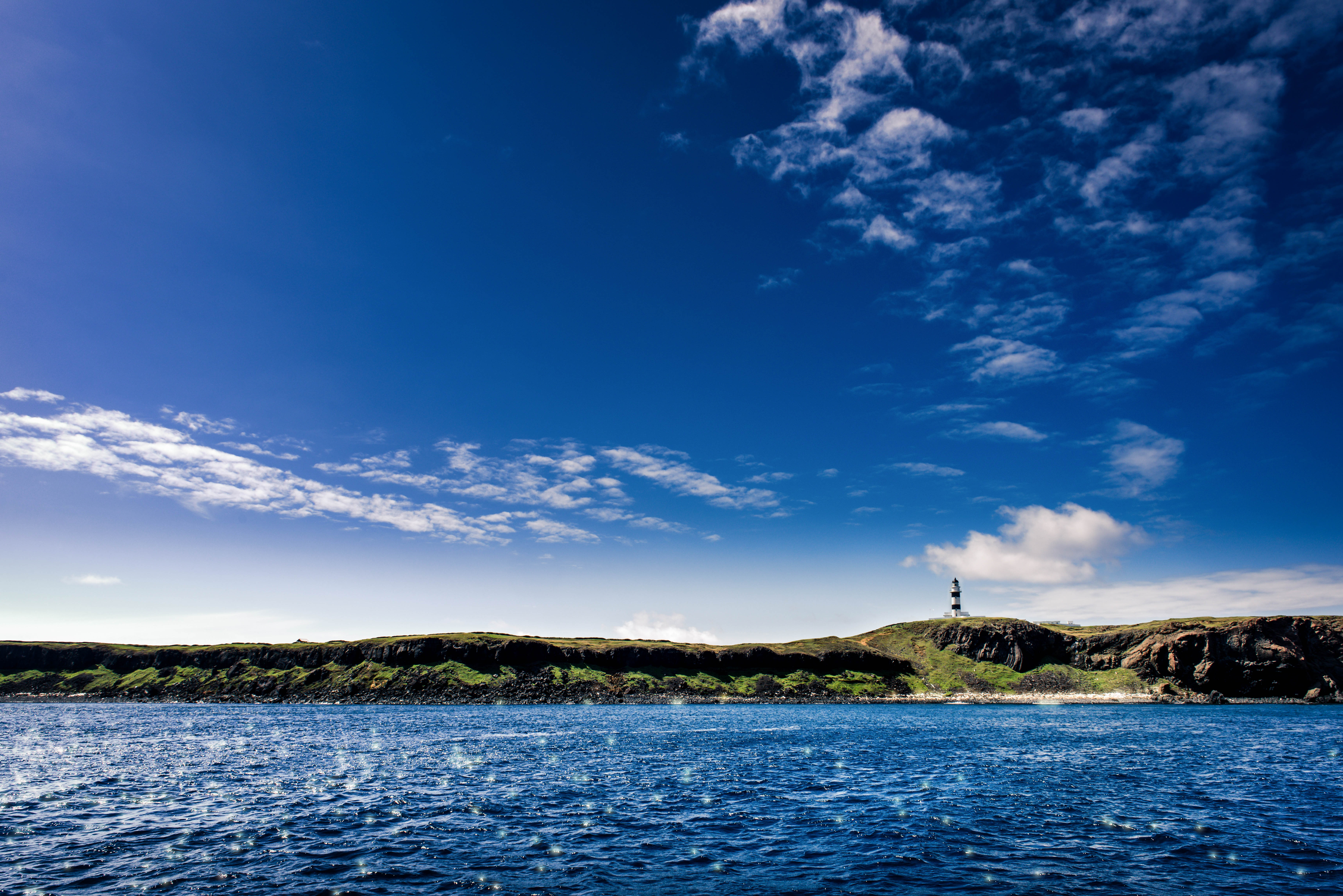
- Dongji Island
- Interactive map of South Penghu Marine National Park
- Location: Wang'an, Penghu, Taiwan
- Nearest city: Magong
- Coordinates: 23°15′N 119°40′E
- Area: 358.44 km^{2} (138.39 mi^{2})
- Established: 2014
- Visitors: 8403 (in 2017)
- Governing body: Marine National Park Headquarters, National Park Service, Ministry of the Interior, Taiwan
- Website: www.marine.gov.tw

South Penghu Marine National Park (Chinese: 澎湖南方四島國家公園; pinyin: Pēnghú Nánfāng Sìdǎo Guójiā Gōngyuán) is a national park of Taiwan in the south of Penghu Islands. The marine park includes the islands of Dongjiyu, Xijiyu, Dongyupingyu, Xiyupingyu, other smaller islets and surrounding waters. It is managed by the Marine National Park Headquarters.

== History ==
There were once thousands of people living on the islands. Because the area has little transportation and few jobs, the population has decreased, and there are now only about 50 people.

In 2008, cold weather in Penghu killed a lot of marine life. The southern part of Penghu was less affected because it is at a lower latitude and was warmer. One of the reasons that the national park was established was that it could support a lot of marine life and become a "germplasm bank" of Penghu. The Penghu Columnar Basalt Nature Reserve Nanhai, containing Dongjiyu, Xijiyu and a few smaller islands, was established in 2008. South Penghu Marine National Park was established on 8 June 2014 and opened on 18 October 2014.

Fishing is restricted in parts of the park. Some fishermen are concerned that the restrictions will affect fishing. The Marine National Park Headquarters says that the restrictions will make the fishing more sustainable.

== Description ==
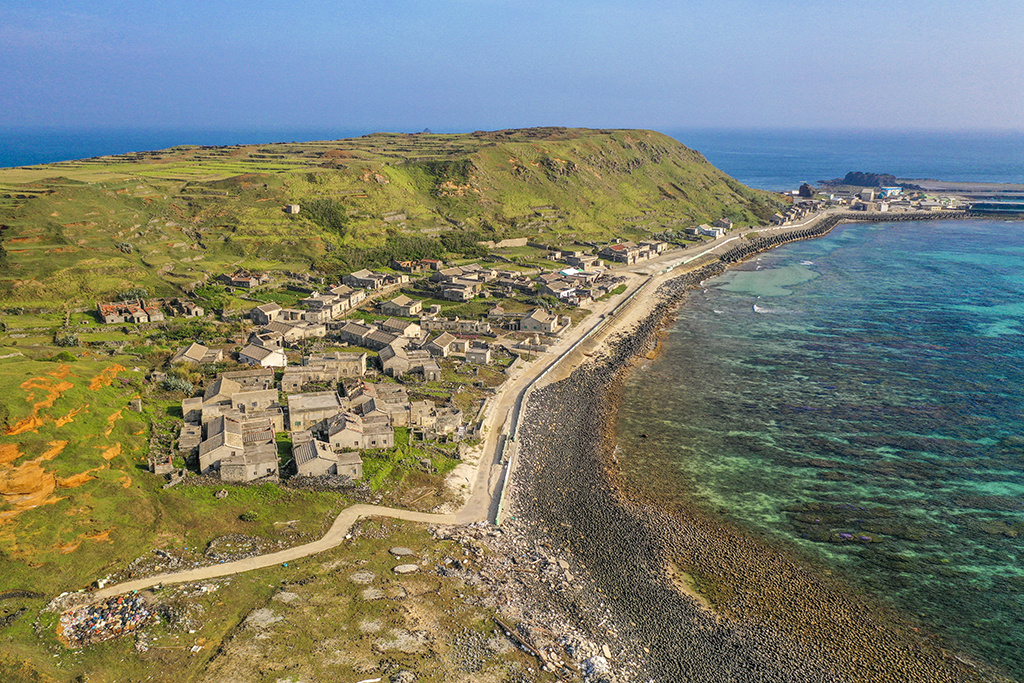
Dongyuping Islet

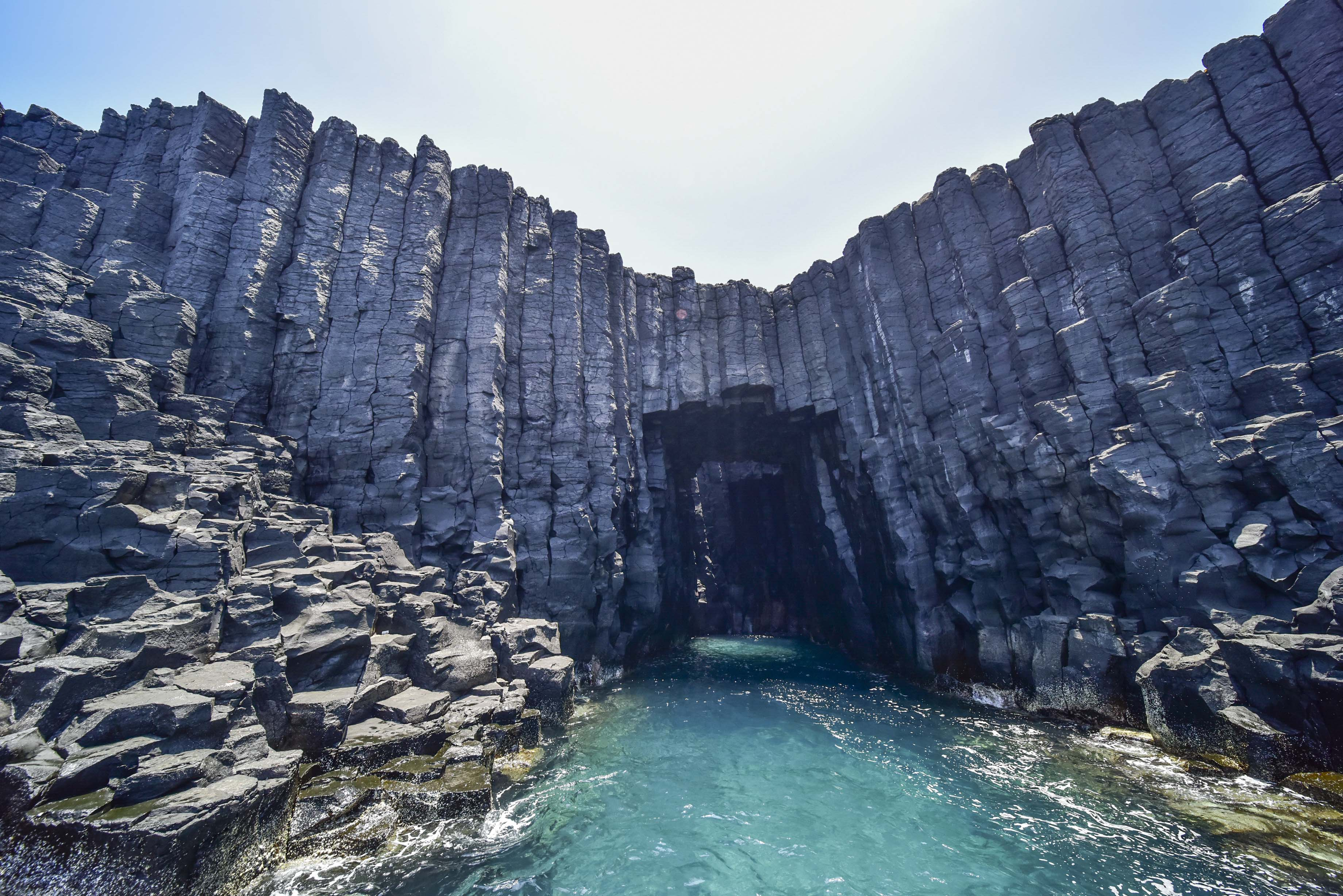
The Blue Cave

South Penghu Marine National Park is between 23°14' and 23°17' N, and between 119°30' and 119°40' E. It is in Wangan Township. Its total area is about 358.44 km^{2}, with 354.73 km^{2} of water and 3.70 km^{2} of land. The islands have basalt landforms, including columnar basalt. There are abandoned houses and a few temples on the islands. There are also walls built of stone, called "cai zhai", that were used to protect vegetables from strong winds. There is a lighthouse on Dongjiyu. The "Blue Cave" is a sea cave on Xijiyu.

== Ecology ==
Many species of migratory birds, such as terns, visit the islands. Small numbers of dolphins and smaller whales have recently returned to the waters while large baleen whales may still be in serious peril or became regionally extinct such as gray whales as the fossils discovered from here became the first records of the species from Taiwanese waters. There are coral reefs and many kinds of marine animals in the sea. 254 species of fish, including 28 newly discovered species, have been recorded. There are 154 species of coral. There are also aquatic plants. Part of the warm Kuroshio Current flows to Penghu, supporting the marine life.

Since 2010, the Marine National Park Headquarters and some other organizations have inspected the coral reefs and removed crown-of-thorns starfish, which eat coral. No large populations of crown-of-thorns starfish were found in 2014 and 2015. It is unclear if this was caused by the removal of the crown-of-thorns starfish or the life cycle of the starfish.

== See also ==
- National parks of Taiwan
