= Yanshui River =

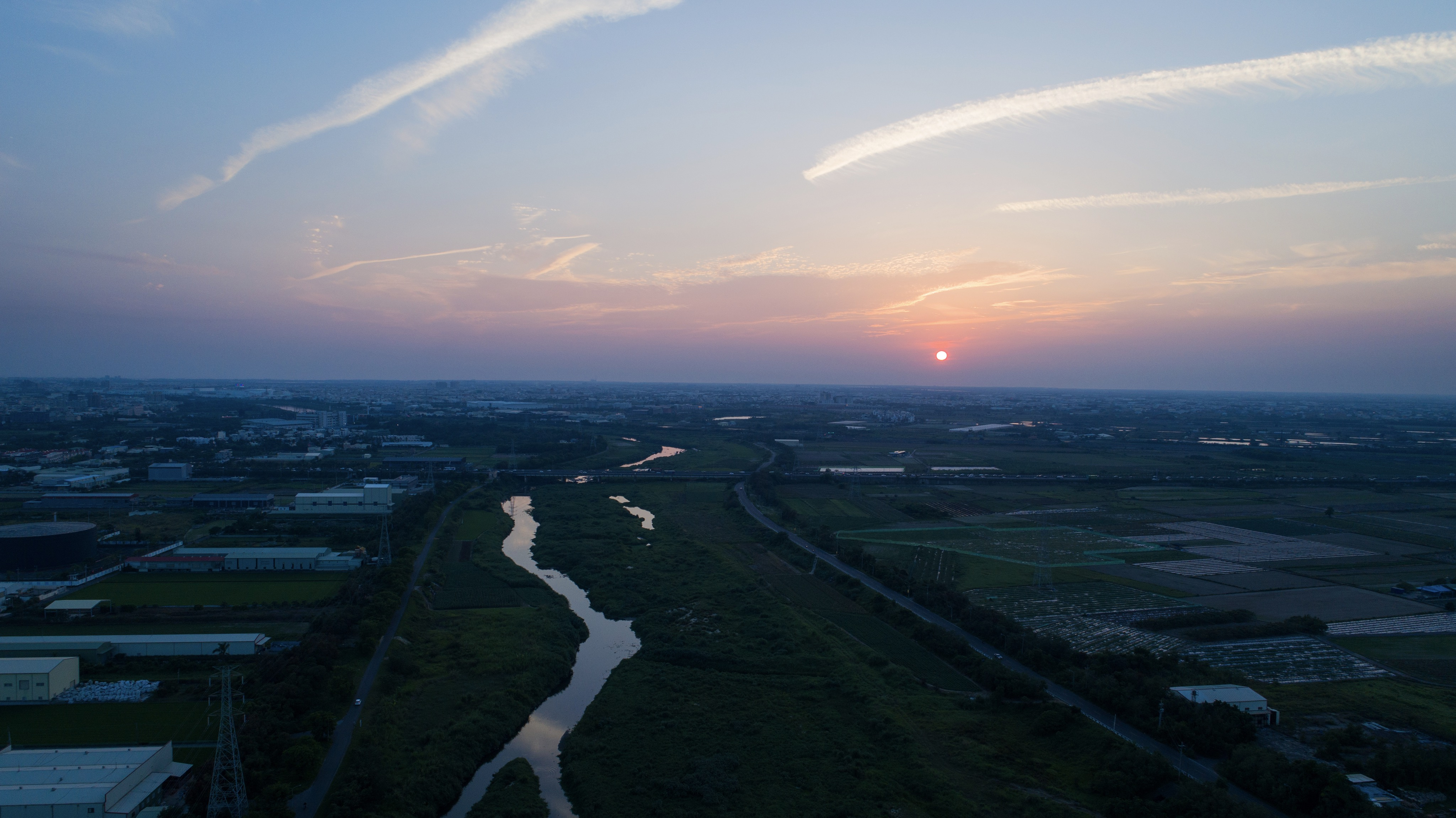
- Yanshui River seen from Sinshih District, Tainan

- Yanshui River in Taiwan

Location
- Country: Taiwan

Physical characteristics
- Mouth
  - location: Taiwan Strait: Anping District/Annan District
  - coordinates: 23.004°N 120.15°E
- Length: 41 km (25 mi)
- Basin size: 343 km^{2} (132 sq mi)

Basin features
- Landmarks: Taijiang National Park

The Yanshui River (Chinese: 鹽水溪; Hanyu Pinyin: Yánshuǐ Xī; Tongyong Pinyin: Yánshuěi Si; Pe̍h-ōe-jī: Kiâm-chuí-khe) is a river in southern Taiwan. It flows through Tainan City for about 41.3 km. The wetlands at the river mouth fall partly in the Taijiang National Park.

== See also ==
- List of rivers in Taiwan
