= Blue Cave (Penghu) =

Cave in Wang'an, Penghu, Taiwan

- 藍洞
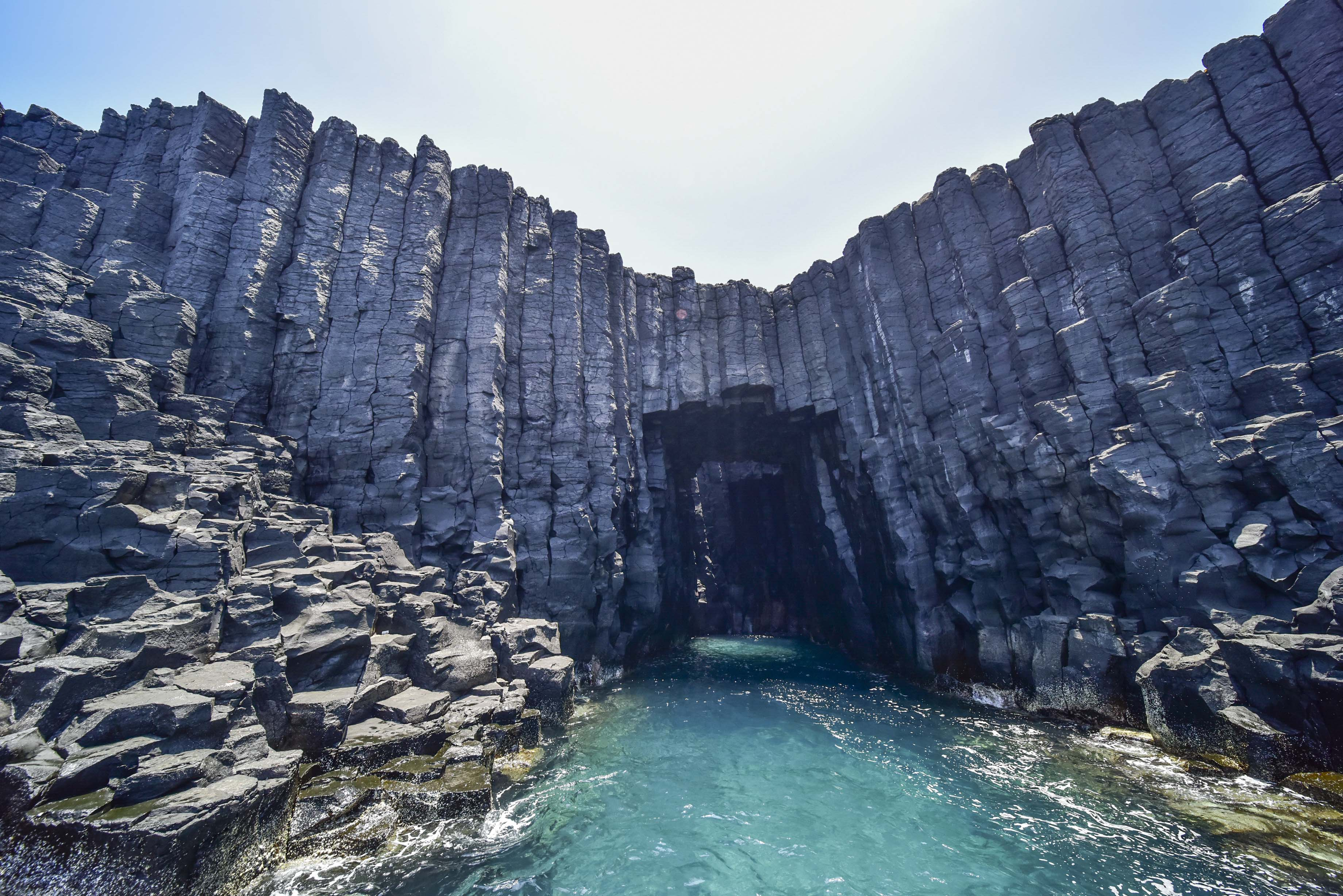

- Location within Taiwan
- Location: Wang'an, Penghu, Taiwan
- Coordinates: 23°15′04.2″N 119°36′33.2″E
- Geology: cave

The Blue Cave (traditional Chinese: 藍洞; simplified Chinese: 蓝洞; pinyin: Lán Dòng) is a cave on Xiji Islet in Wang'an Township, Penghu, Taiwan. It is part of the South Penghu Marine National Park.

== History ==
The cave was created by natural erosion.

== Geology ==
The cave is prone to rock falls due to sea erosion and uneven surfaces.
