= Tataka Visitor Center =

Visitor center in Xinyi, Nantou County, Taiwan

- 塔塔加遊客中心
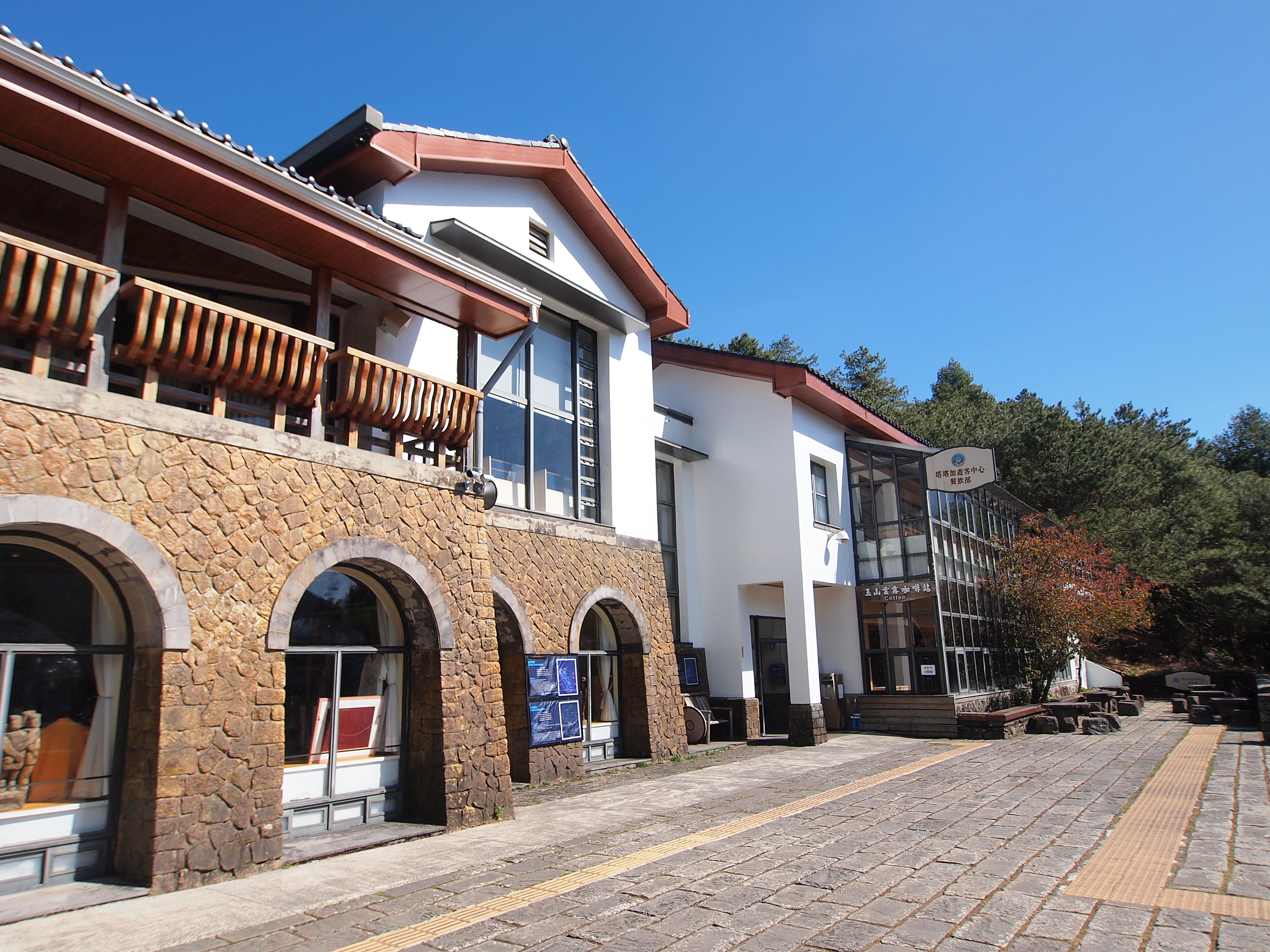
- Interactive map of the Tataka Visitor Center area

General information
- Type: visitor center
- Location: Xinyi, Nantou County, Taiwan
- Coordinates: 23°29′15.2″N 120°53′30.2″E
- Elevation: 2,600 m (8,500 ft)

The Tataka Visitor Center (Chinese: 塔塔加遊客中心; pinyin: Tǎtǎjiā Yóukè Zhōngxīn) is a visitor center in Yushan National Park located in Xinyi Township, Nantou County, Taiwan.

== Architecture ==
At its upper floor, the visitor center consists of an exhibition hall about geology, wildlife, plants and culture. The building is located at an altitude of 2,600 meters above sea level.

== Transportation ==
The visitor center is located along the Provincial Highway 21.

== See also ==
- List of tourist attractions in Taiwan
