= Dongsha Atoll National Park =

National park in Kaohsiung, Taiwan

- IUCN category II (national park)
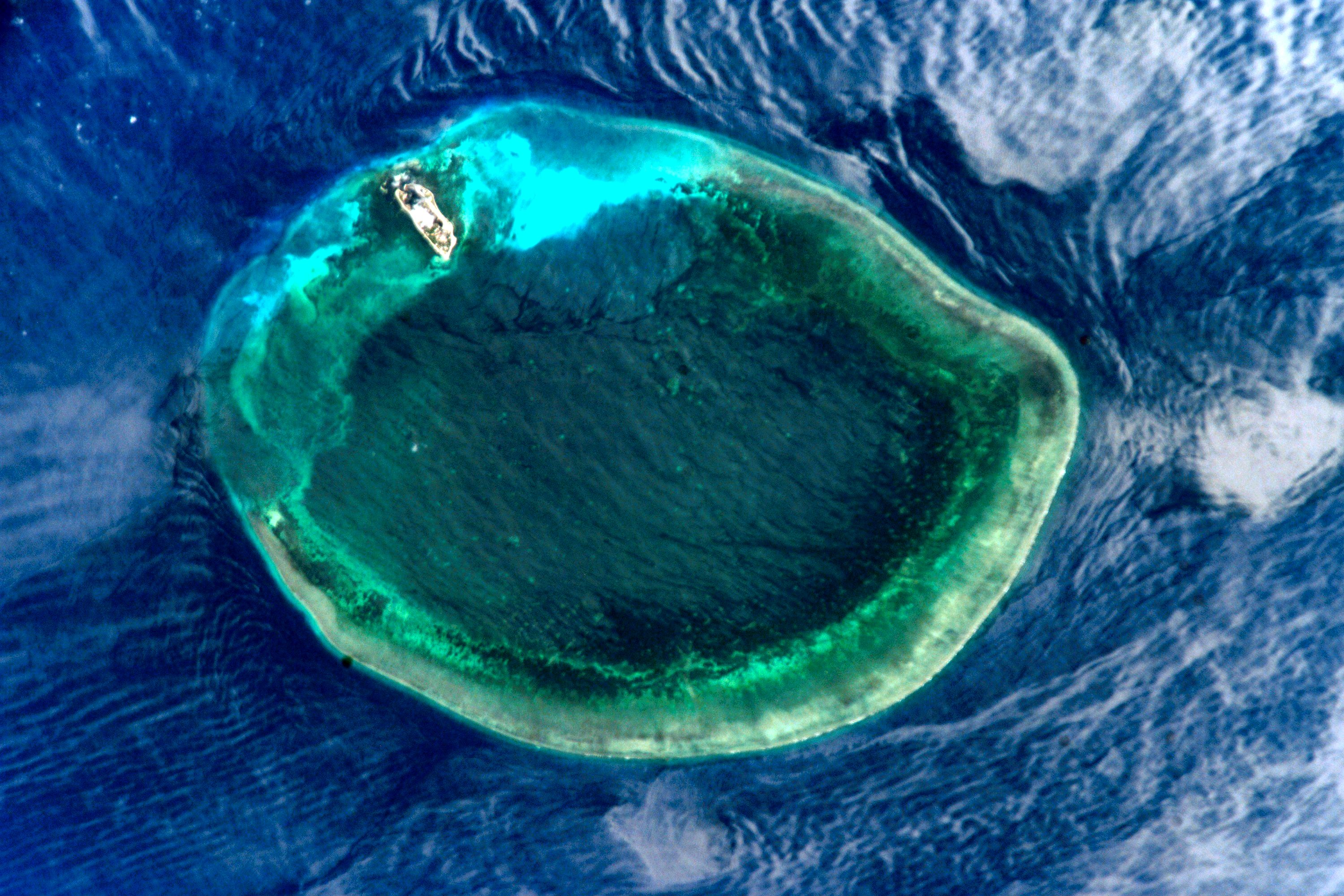
- Interactive map of Dongsha Atoll National Park
- Location: Pratas Island
- Coordinates: 20°43′N 116°42′E
- Area: 3,537 km^{2} (1,366 mi^{2})
- Established: 17 January 2007
- Governing body: Marine National Park Headquarters, National Park Service, Ministry of the Interior, Taiwan
- Website: www.marine.gov.tw

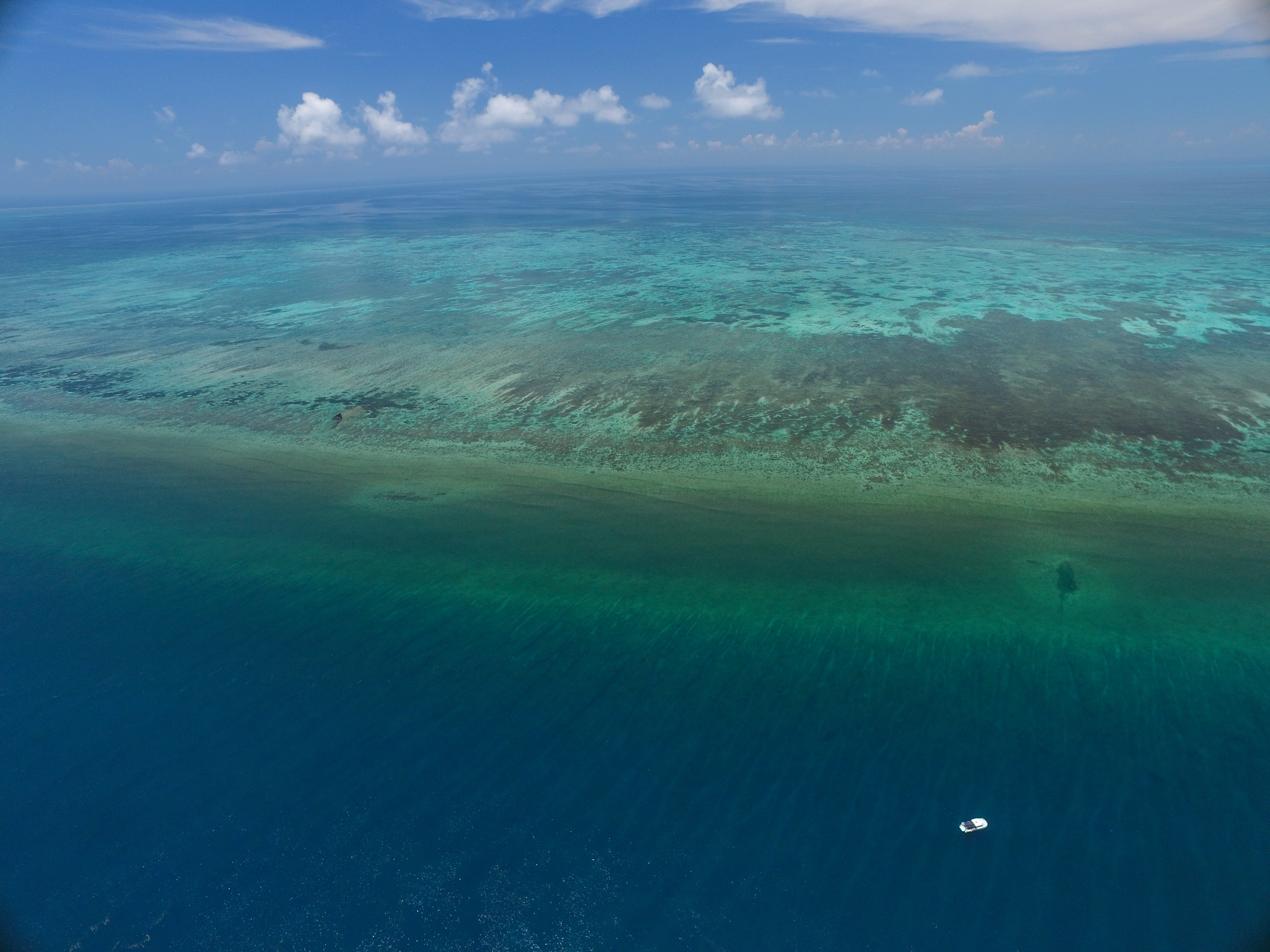
Pratas Atoll

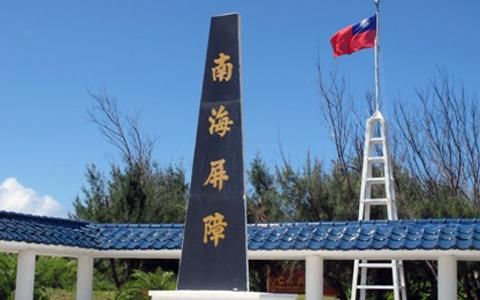
Dongsha monument

The Dongsha Atoll National Park (Chinese: 東沙環礁國家公園; pinyin: Dōngshā Huánjiāo Guójiā Gōngyuán) is the seventh national park of the Republic of China (Taiwan).

The marine park is located at Pratas Island (Dongsha Island) in the north of the South China Sea, and includes the Dongsha Atoll (Pratas Atoll), a circular atoll 25 kilometres (16 mi) in diameter with a tropical monsoon climate, and the surrounding seas. The total area is 3,537 square kilometres (1,366 sq mi), with 1.79 square kilometres (0.69 sq mi) of land.

The Park is managed by the Ministry of the Interior. It was established on 17 January 2007; and on 4 October of the same year an administrative office was set up in Kaohsiung City.

The park is not open to tourism due to environmental restoration, safety, and ecological studies currently in progress.

== Oceanology ==
Average temperature and precipitation of Dongsha Atoll (1996~2005)
Month	Jan	Feb	Mar	Apr	May	Jun	Jul	Aug	Sep	Oct	Nov	Dec	Average
Temperature (°C)	21.7	22.0	23.9	26.2	27.9	29.1	29.6	29.3	28.4	26.9	24.9	22.3	26.016
Precipitation (mm)	23.9	25.0	17.5	56.1	141.2	166.9	193.7	211.4	244.2	146.1	44.0	76.3	112.192

== Ecology ==
Seagrass Beds are well formed in the atoll and in adjacent waters, providing rich bio-diversities of marine life from fish, jelly fish, squid, sicklefin lemon sharks, and rays to rarer sea turtles, Dugongs, and cetaceans (dolphins and whales). Recovery of green sea turtles has especially been noted. Possible use of the atoll as a breeding ground by lemon sharks have been speculated due to the numbers of infants that have been discovered. Dongsha Atoll is an important stepping-stone, that promotes regional genetic and potentially demographic connectivity in the South China Sea, because larvae from Dongsha can reach many South China Sea reefs. Thus, its protection as a national park can potentially benefit the whole region.

In the past, illegal fishing has damaged the park. In 2004, a project to restore and conserve the ecology was approved, then to explore the possibility of environmental education and tourism.

== See also ==
- National parks of Taiwan
- List of tourist attractions in Taiwan
