= National Park Service (Taiwan) =

Government agency of the Republic of China

- 內政部國家公園署

Agency overview
- Formed: 2023-09-20
- Preceding agency: National Parks Division
- Headquarters: Daan, Taipei, Taiwan
- Parent agency: Ministry of the Interior
- Website: www.nps.gov.tw

The National Park Service (NPS; Chinese: 內政部國家公園署; pinyin: Nèizhèng Bù Guójiā Gōngyuán Shǔ) is the government agency of the Ministry of the Interior of Taiwan responsible for the management of national parks, national nature parks, wetlands, and coastal areas.

== History ==
National Park Service was established on 20 September 2023, in accordance with the Organization Act of the National Park Service, Ministry of the Interior.

The agency was established under the Ministry of the Interior after the National Parks Division was separated out of the former Construction and Planning Agency (CPA). The nine national park headquarters of Kenting, Yushan, Yangminshan, Taroko, Shei-Pa, Kinmen, Taijiang, Marine National Parks and Natural National Park, which were previously under the CPA, were now merged into the National Park Service.

Other operations of CPA regarding wetlands and coastal areas were also merged into the National Park Service, this included:

- Coastal Management Section of the Integrated Planning Division
- Coastal Restoration Section of the Urban and Rural Development Branch

== Achievements ==
- On 18 August 2024, the National Park Service formed a cross-agency task force in order to tackle starfish overpopulation problem in the Dongsha Atoll National Park. The task force deployed their first volunteer group on 23 August, and as of 13 September, a total of 11,044 crown-of-thorns starfish had been removed.
- On 10 September 2024, the National Park Service organized a meeting with representatives from the leading national parks to reduce the increasing human and Formosan macaque conflicts. After the meeting, new guidance were issued on tourist to remain alert when visiting known areas of macaque activity, refrain from feeding macaques and maintain a distance of five meters from all macaques.

== Organizational structure ==
The organizational structure of the agency is as follows:

- Integrated Planning Division
- Environmental Planning Division
- Recreation Management Division
- Conservation and Interpretation Division
- Secretariat Office
- Personnel Office
- Civil Service Ethics Office
- Accounting Office

National park headquarters and jurisdictions
Name	National (Natural) parks under jurisdiction	Establishment date
Kenting National Park Headquarters	Kenting National Park	1984-01-01
Yushan National Park Headquarters	Yushan National Park	1985-04-10
Yangmingshan National Park Headquarters	Yangmingshan National Park	1985-09-16
Taroko National Park Headquarters	Taroko National Park	1986-11-28
Shei-Pa National Park Headquarters	Shei-Pa National Park	1992-07-01
Kinmen National Park Headquarters	Kinmen National Park	1995-10-18
Marine National Park Headquarters	Dongsha Atoll National Park	2007-10-04
Marine National Park Headquarters	South Penghu Marine National Park	2007-10-04
Taijiang National Park Headquarters	Taijiang National Park	2009-10-15
National Nature Park Headquarters	Shoushan National Natural Park	2019-11-28
National Nature Park Headquarters	Taichung Metropolitan Park	2019-11-28
National Nature Park Headquarters	Kaohsiung Metropolitan Park	2019-11-28

The agency is also responsible for the administration duties for the following committees of the Ministry of the Interior:

- National Parks Planning Committee
- Major Wetlands Review Committee
- Coastal Management Review Committee

== See also ==
- National parks of Taiwan
- List of protected areas of Taiwan
