= Taoyuan Guanxin Algal Reefs Ecosystem Wildlife Refuge =

Wildlife refuge in Taoyuan, Taiwan

Taoyuan Guanxin Algal Reefs Ecosystem Wildlife Refuge Chinese: 挖子尾自然保留區
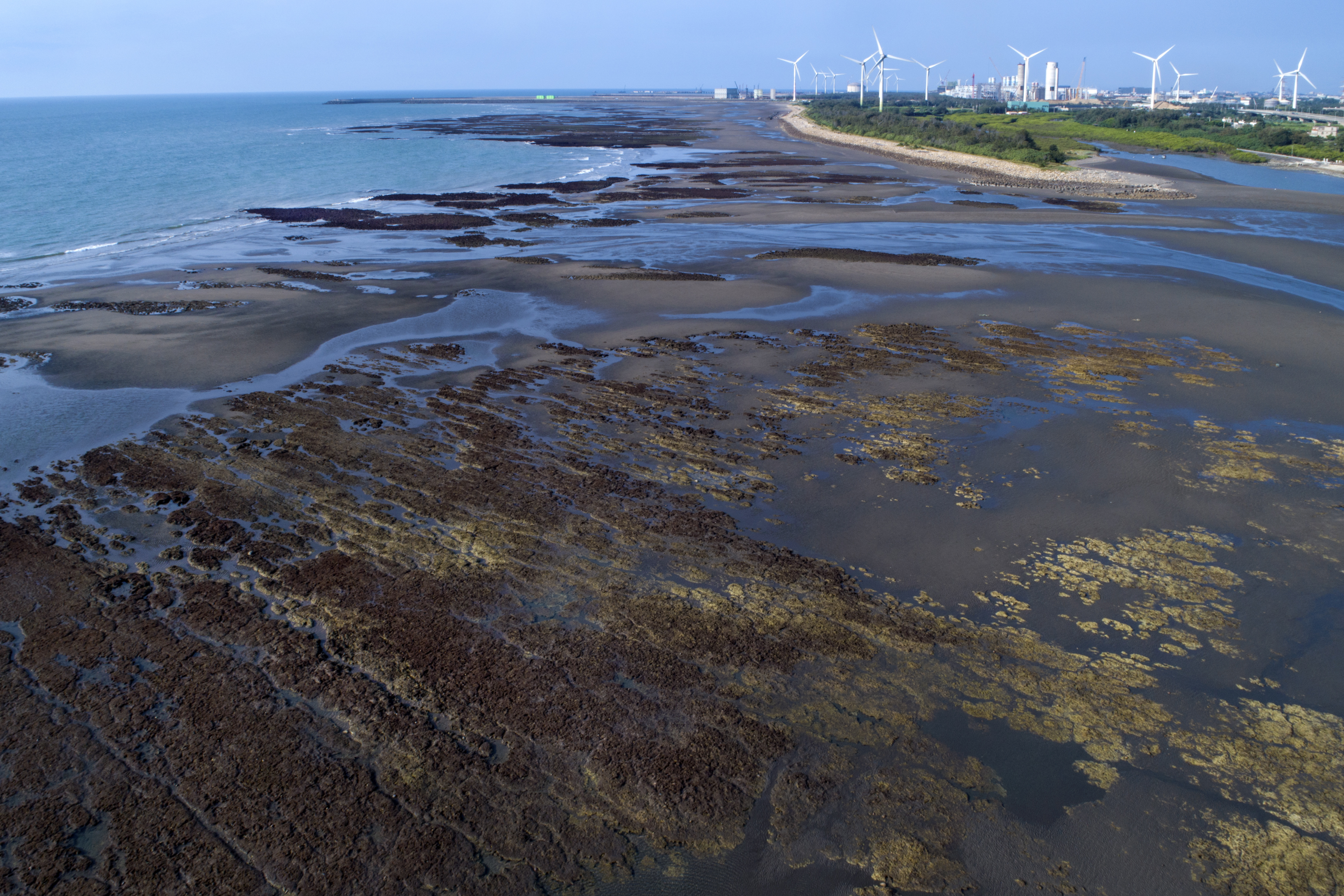

- Location within Taiwan
- Interactive map of Taoyuan Guanxin Algal Reefs Ecosystem Wildlife Refuge

Geography
- Location: Guanyin District, Taoyuan, Taiwan
- Coordinates: 25°00′45″N 121°01′35″E
- Area: 315 ha (780 acres)

Administration
- Established: 7 July 2014
- Authority: Taoyuan City Government

Ecology
- Ecosystem: wildlife sanctuary

Taoyuan Guanxin Algal Reefs Ecosystem Wildlife Refuge (traditional Chinese: 桃園觀新藻礁生態系野生動物保護區; simplified Chinese: 桃园观新藻礁生态系野生动物保护区; pinyin: Táoyuán Guān Xīn Zǎo Jiāo Shēngtài Xì Yěshēng Dòngwù Bǎohù Qū) is a wildlife sanctuary in Guanyin District, Taoyuan, Taiwan. Taoyuan Guanxin Algae Reef Ecosystem Wildlife Refuge is an algal reef terrain that belongs to the southernmost block of algal reefs that is rare in the world. The Taoyuan algae reef is a biological reef built by the deposition of calcium carbonate through calcification in the body, with unsegmented or shell-like coralline algae as the main reef-building organisms.

Taoyuan once had 27 km (17 mi) of algal reef coast. Due to the impact of industrial pollution and land reclamation in the north, only about 7 km (4.3 mi) of relatively healthy algal reef areas remain in the south. From north to south, they include: White Jade Algae Reef and Tai Tam Algae Reef and Guanxin Algae Reef.

== History ==
=== Prehistory ===
The biological reefs in this area began to grow about 7,500 years ago. At this time, they were mainly stony corals. The algal reefs, dominated by coralline algae, began to develop about 4,400 years ago, probably because the environment at that time was not suitable for coral growth.

=== Modern ===
In order to protect the still healthy Taoyuan algae reefs, on July 7, 2014, the Taoyuan City Government announced the delineation of wildlife protection areas and important habitats in accordance with the "Wildlife Conservation Act" for about 4 kilometers of the Guanxin algae reefs, known as the Taoyuan Guanxin Algal Reef Ecosystem Wildlife Refuge.

Local civil society groups in Taoyuan believe that the Taoyuan Guanxin Algae Ecosystem Wildlife Refuge should be designated as a natural reserve with a higher level of protection in accordance with the Cultural Assets Preservation Act. However, the Taoyuan City Government spent NT$9.2 million to ask the Taiwan Wetland Society to investigate and recommended "wise use" to designate it as a wildlife reserve. After deliberation and approval by the Forestry Bureau of the Council of Agriculture of the Executive Yuan, it was designated as a wildlife reserve for zoning management. It is prohibited to change or destroy the original natural state in the core area. Entry without permission is prohibited. People must apply to enter the buffer zone every day. The carrying capacity is limited to 200 people.

== Ecology ==
The Taoyuan algal reef is not only one of the rarest reefs in the world built mainly with shell-like coralline algae, it is also the largest living reef currently built with shell-like coralline algae in Taiwan. The largest living algal reef ecosystem with the highest purity of shell-like coralline algae.

Like coral reefs, algal reefs can also become habitats for a variety of organisms, including carnivorous aquatic animals such as the genus Crab. The Center for Biological Diversity of Academia Sinica has used "Underwater Soundscape" to explore algal reefs and found that there are many sounds made by crustaceans.

Due to the establishment of the Taoyuan Guanxin Algal Reefs Ecosystem Wildlife Refuge, in the relatively healthy algal reef area 7 km (4.3 mi) to the south, only the Guanxin Algae Reef currently has more quantitative ecological research data. The reserve contains rich marine life and bird ecology: according to surveys, the algal reef has a high degree of species biodiversity, and the animal density is eight times that of Hsinchu Xiangshan Wetland and five times that of Taichung Gaomei Wetland. In 2017, compared with the White Jade Algae Reef, in addition to the discovery of many suspected new species of shell-like coralline algae in the Tai Tam Algae Reef, the first-level protected animal Chai Shan Polyporus was also discovered, showing that the Tai Tam Algae Reef has a very rich ecosystem, compared with the ecology of Guanxin algae reef, it can be said to be on par with the ecology. Therefore, the overall ecological functions and biodiversity of the relatively healthy algal reef area 7 km (4.3 mi) south of the Taoyuan algal reef still require further research by the academic community.

== See also ==
- Geography of Taiwan
