= Kinmen National Park =

National park in Kinmen, Taiwan

- IUCN category II (national park)
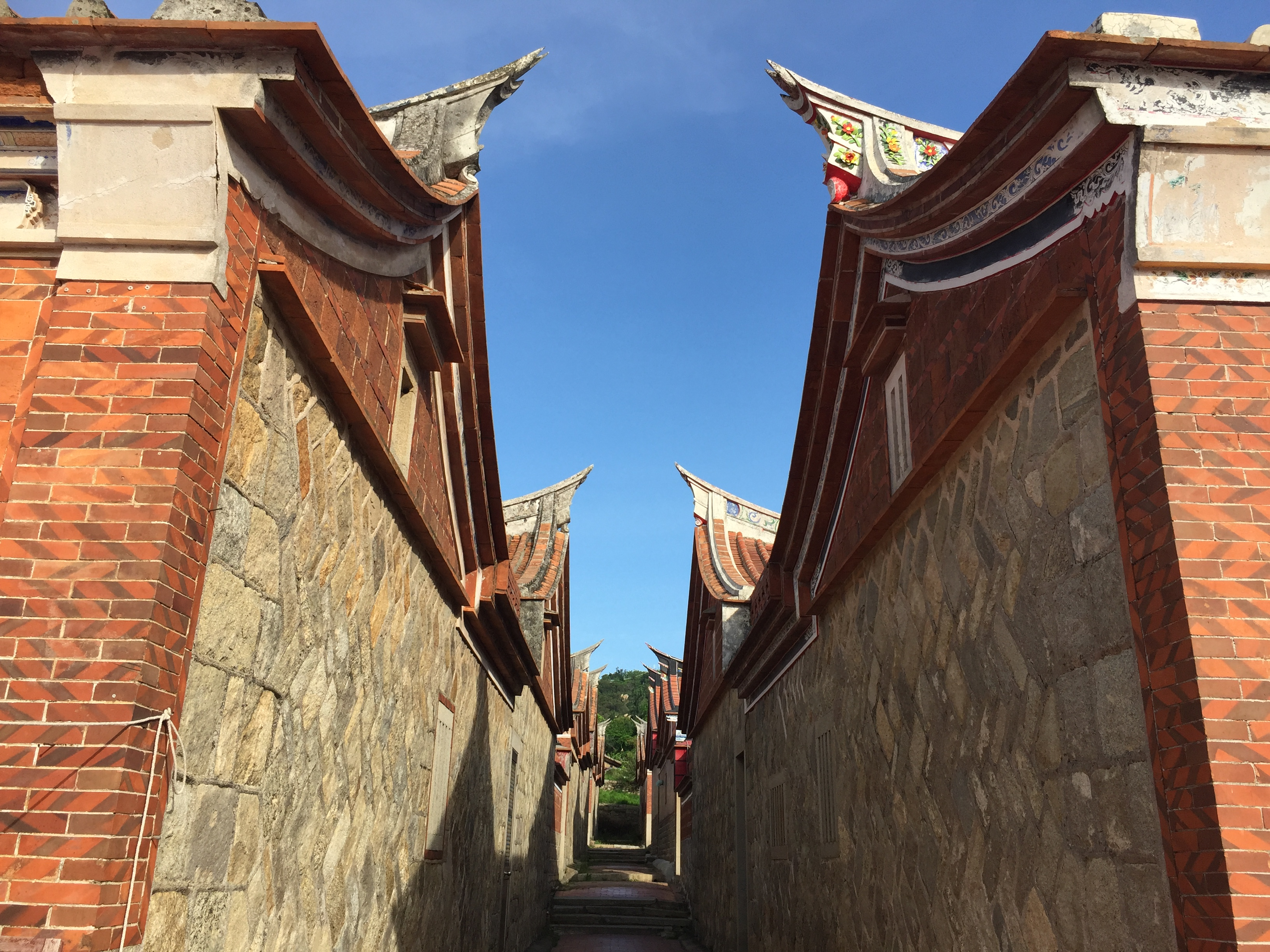
- Historic area in Kinmen National Park

- Kinmen National Park area in Kinmen County
- Location: Kinmen, Fujian, Republic of China (Taiwan)
- Coordinates: 24°26′52″N 118°21′52″E
- Area: 35.29 km^{2} (13.63 sq mi)
- Established: 18 October 1995
- Governing body: Kinmen National Park Headquarters, National Park Service, Ministry of the Interior, Taiwan
- Website: www.kmnp.gov.tw

The Kinmen National Park (traditional Chinese: 金門國家公園; simplified Chinese: 金门国家公园; pinyin: Jīnmén Guójiā Gōngyuán) is a national park on the island of Kinmen, Fuchien Province, Taiwan.

== History ==
The park was established in 1995, three years after martial law was lifted in the county.

== Geology ==
The park covers an area of 35.3 km^{2} or around a quarter of Kinmen County area. It is divided into five areas, which are Taiwu Mountain, Kuningtou, Gugang, Mashan Hill, and Lieyu.

== Ecology ==
Due to its subtropical climate and low human population, the park becomes the place for migratory birds during autumn until spring. As many as 319 species of bird have been sighted in the area.

== Types ==
- Scenic area
- Historical preservation area
- Recreational area
- General restricted area

== See also ==
- List of national parks in Taiwan
