= Taijiang National Park =

National park in Tainan, Taiwan

Taijiang National Park 台江國家公園
- IUCN category II (national park)
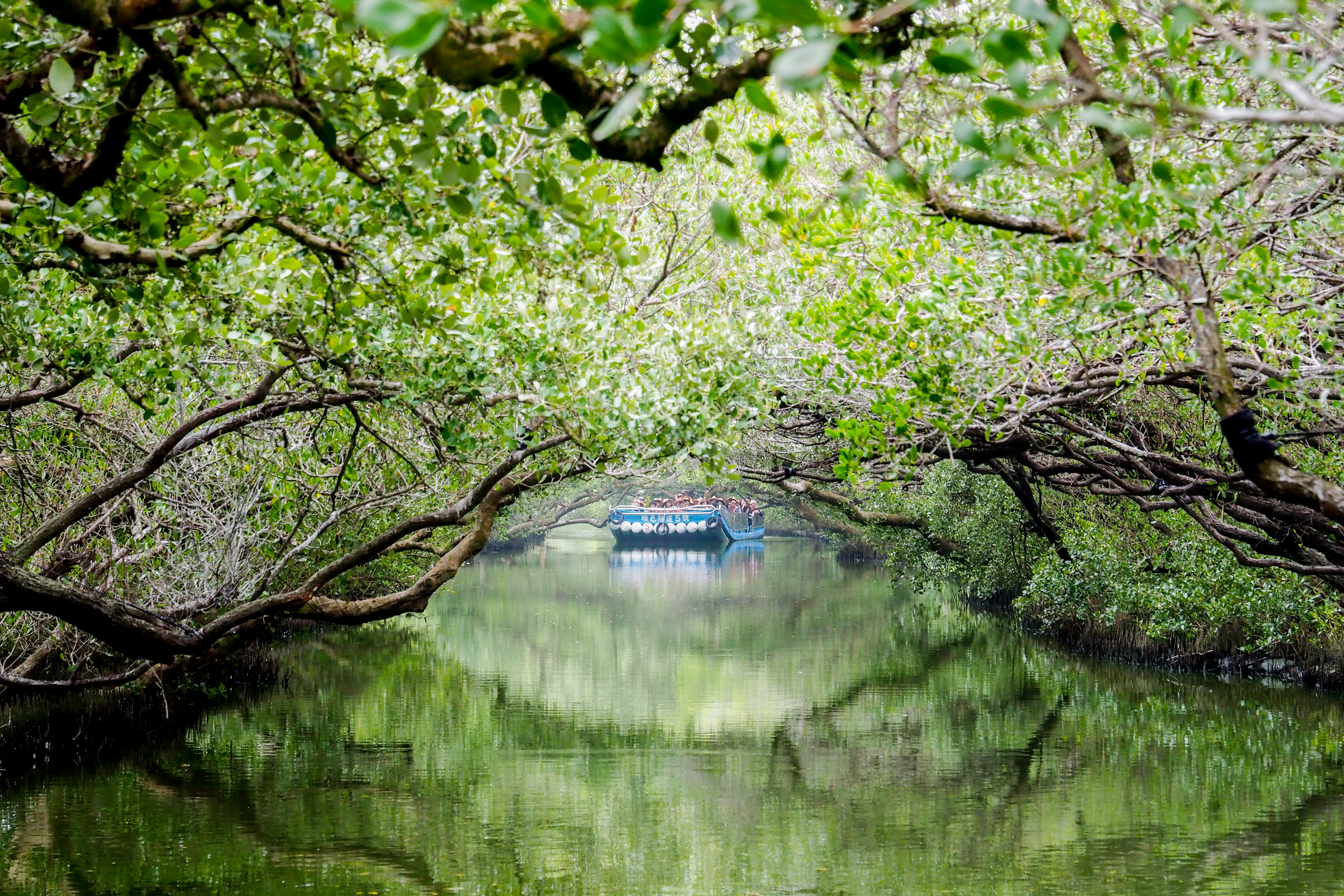
- A tunnel of mangroves in Taijiang National Park

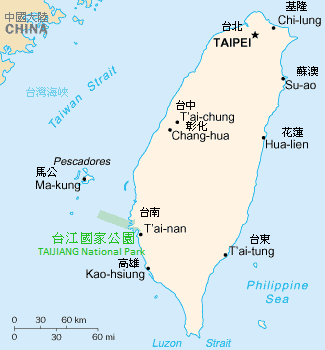
- Location of Taijiang National Park
- Location: Tainan, Taiwan
- Coordinates: 23°03′47″N 120°03′18″E
- Area: 393.1 km^{2} (151.8 mi^{2})
- Established: October 15, 2009
- Governing body: Taijiang National Park Headquarters, National Park Service, Ministry of the Interior, Taiwan
- Website: www.tjnp.gov.tw

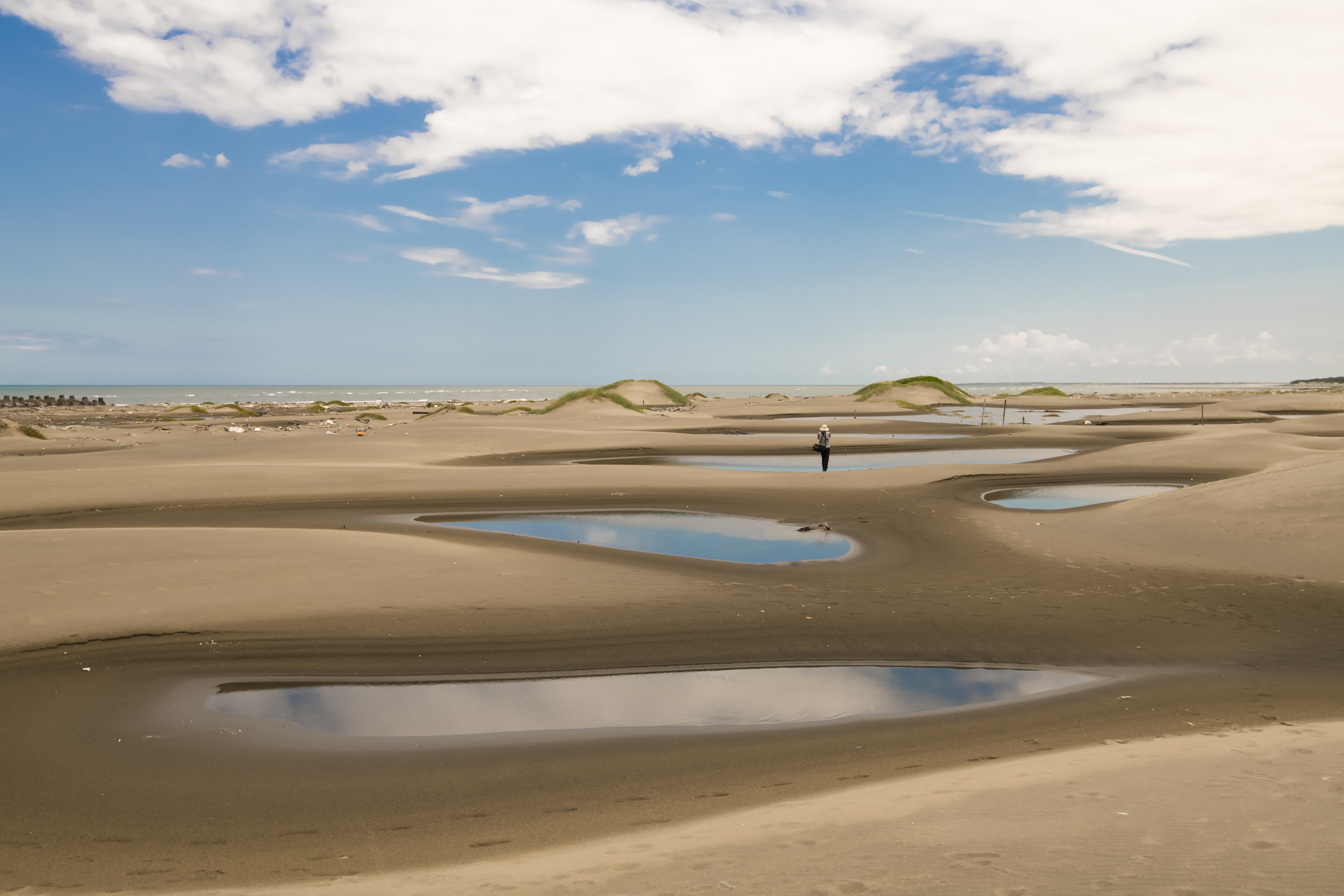
Taijiang National Park Dingtou Sandbar

Taijiang National Park (traditional Chinese: 台江國家公園; simplified Chinese: 台江国家公园; pinyin: Táijiāng Guójiā Gōngyuán) is a national park in Tainan, Taiwan.

== History ==
Taijiang National Park was established on October 15, 2009. Its name comes from the Taijiang Lagoon, which existed in the area during the 17th century and was gradually filled up over the course of the 18th century.

== Geology ==
The majority of the park lies within the municipality of Tainan. In total, the park's planned area stretches from the southern sea wall of Qingshan Fishing Harbor to the south bank of the Yanshui River and is mostly public coastal land. The westernmost point on the island of Taiwan, Guosheng Port Lighthouse, is within the boundaries of the park, which measures 20.7 km (12.9 mi) north to south and has an area of 393.1 km^{2} (151.8 mi^{2}), of which land accounts for 49.05 km^{2} (18.94 mi^{2}). The marine area covers a band extending 20 metres (66 ft) from the shore and 54 km (34 mi) long from Yanshui River to Dongji Island, an area of 344.05 km^{2} (132.84 mi^{2}).

== See also ==
- List of national parks in Taiwan
