= Yushan National Park =

National park in Nantou County, Taiwan

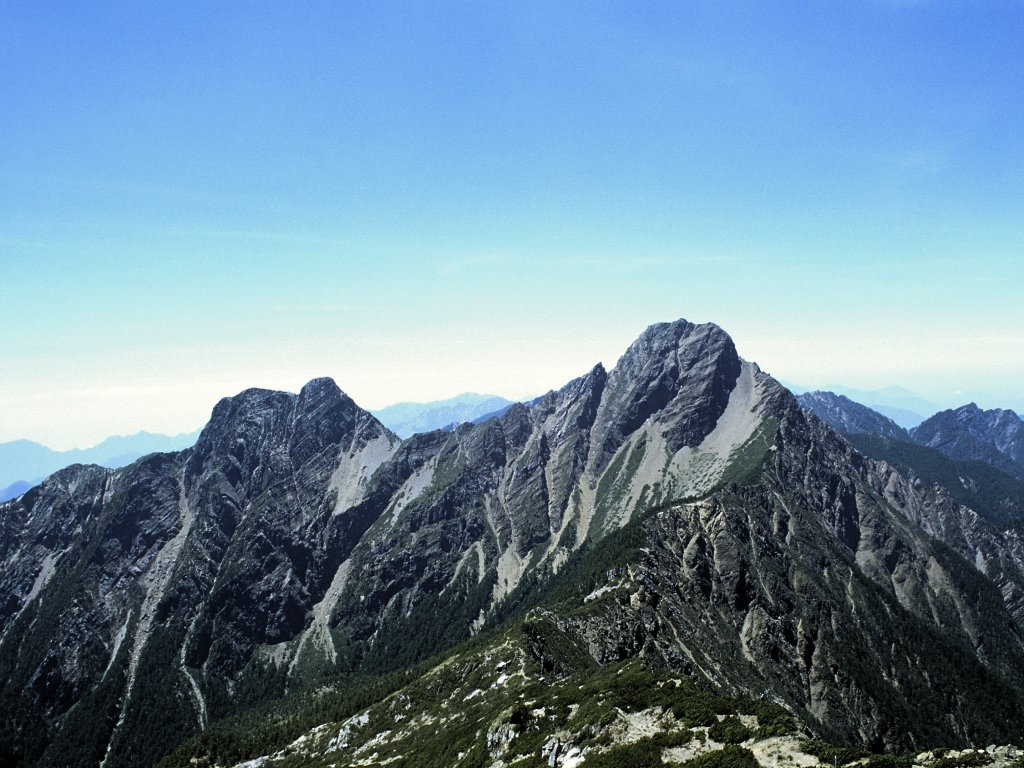
- Yushan (Mount Jade) is Taiwan's tallest mountain at 3,952m (12,966 ft)

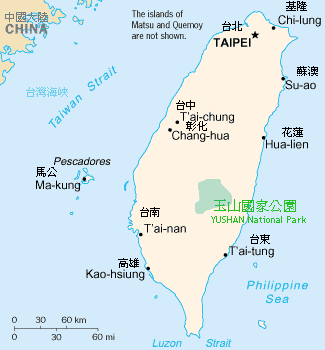
- Location of Yushan National Park
- Location: Nantou County, Taiwan
- Nearest city: Shuili
- Coordinates: 23°28′12″N 120°57′26.16″E
- Area: 103,121 ha (398.15 sq mi)
- Established: April 10, 1985
- Visitors: 1,349,281 (in 2005)
- Governing body: Yushan National Park Headquarters, National Park Service, Ministry of the Interior, Taiwan
- Website: www.ysnp.gov.tw

Yushan National Park (Chinese: 玉山國家公園; pinyin: Yù Shān Gúojiā Gōngyuán) is one of the nine national parks in Taiwan and was named after the summit Yushan, the highest peak of the park. The park covers a total area of 103,121 hectares that includes large sections of the Central Mountain Range. The park contains more than thirty peaks over 3,000 metres (9,843 ft) in elevation, and two-thirds of the area within the park is above 2,000 metres (6,562 ft). The elevation difference in the park is 3,600 metres (11,811 ft), and there are many canyons, cliffs, and valleys.

Because of its remote location and entry control, Yushan National Park is not among the most visited national parks in Taiwan. Even so, the park attracted 1,044,994 visitors in 2015. For its flora and fauna, it is considered a potential World Heritage Site.

== Geology ==
Taiwan, which owes its existence to the power of plate tectonics, remains a place of regular seismic activity. Examples of geological features such as fault lines, joints, and folding can be seen throughout Yushan National Park:

- Great Precipice (大峭壁) — Great Precipice (23.4683339 120.9396649) is located 1.2 km before Paiyun Lodge (排雲山莊) on the Yushan Trail. A precipitous cliff with fossils of ancient marine species and a few wavy marks in the rock can still remind us of its oceanic past.
- Scree slope at the foot of Main Peak
- Fault scarp in Laonong (荖濃) between Main Peak and Batongguan (八通關)
- Fuzi Cliff (父子斷崖) and Guanshan Cliff (關山斷崖)

The Southern Cross-Island Highway and the Yushan Scenic Highway both offer countless opportunities to witness the area's special geological features.

== Hydrology ==
Yushan is an important watershed of main river systems in central, southern, and eastern Taiwan. It is the water sources of the Zhuoshui River (濁水溪), Kaoping River (高屏溪), and Siouguluan River (秀姑巒溪). The Chenyoulan (陳有蘭溪), Jyunda (郡大溪), Nanzaisian (楠梓仙溪), Laonong (荖濃溪), and Lekuleku (拉庫拉庫溪) rivers are all young rivers from Yushan with V-shaped river beds. Jinmentong cliffs (金門峒斷崖) is a unique landmark along the Chenyoulan River (陳有蘭溪). It was formed when Chenyoulan River (陳有蘭溪) cut through land traversed by a fault line, and it showcases one of the best examples of headway erosion. Jinmentong cliffs (金門峒斷崖), Yunlong Waterfall (雲龍瀑布) and Yinyu Waterfall (乙女瀑布; also known as 七絲瀑布) are some popular scenic points in the park.

Alpine lakes such as Dashueiku (大水窟), Tafen Pond (塔芬池), Jiaming Lake (嘉明湖), and Tienchih (天池) are formed from rain and melting snows in the shadows of surrounding mountain peaks. These lakes provide both visitors and animals precious water from the mountains. However, the ecosystem around them is fragile and needs further protection.

== Flora ==
Yushan National Park is well known for its diverse climate zones and rich biodiversity. The plants found in the park span from subtropical on its foothills to alpine at its summits.

Differences in altitudes, precipitous cliffs, and plunging valleys in the Yushan National Park lend to the park highly unstable weather conditions. Temperatures can vary from warm to cold at the same time at places relatively close. While accounting for merely 3% of Taiwan's total land area, the park has half of Taiwan's native plant species growing within its boundaries. Surveys have found that there are 2,522 different kinds of plants in the park.

With increasing elevation, there are the following six vegetation zonations in the park:

	Altitude	Characteristics
Broadleaf Forest Zone	Below 1,800 metres (5,906 ft)	The broadleaved forest is mainly dominated by trees of the Lauraceae and Fagaceae and forms the mixed forest zone. The second tree layer is composed of members of the Fagaceae, such as Cyclobalanopsis morii, Castanopsis carlesii 小红栲 and Lithocarpus amygdalifolius 杏叶柯. The ground layer plants are also plentiful and include ferns and bracken.
Chamaecyparis Zone	1,800 metres (5,906 ft) — 2,500 metres (8,202 ft)	In this zone, it grows some precious Chamaecyparis pure forests.
Tsuga Chinensis Zone	2,500 metres (8,202 ft) — 3,500 metres (11,483 ft)	In this zone, the coniferous trees are represented by Chamaecyparis formosensis,Chamaecyparis obtusa var. formosana (台湾扁柏), Taiwan cryptomerioides Hayata, Chunninghamia konishii Hayata and Pseudotsuga wilsoniana Hayata;and the deciduous tree by Acer morrisonensis Hayata and Acer serriulatum Hayata. Chamaecyparis formosensis and Chamaecypairs obtusa var. formosana are commonly called cypress.
Abies Kawakamii Zone	About 3,530 metres (11,581 ft)	Groups of Abies kawakamii grow on the western slope of Yushan.
Subalpine Shrub Zone	3,500 metres (11,483 ft) — 3,800 metres (12,467 ft)	Dwarf plants, which grow prostrate and leeward, are the dominant vegetation types of this area.
Alpine Herbaceous Zone	Above 3,800 metres (12,467 ft)	When summer comes, herbaceous plants, such as Adenophora uehatae Yamamoto (高山沙參),Leontopodium microphyllum Hayata, Sedum morrisonensis and Gentiana arisanensis Hayata, give rise to colorful flowers in this area,

== Fauna ==
The park is home to a large variety of birds, mammals, reptiles, amphibians, and butterflies. Between the months of March and May, visitors have the chance to see processions of butterflies fluttering through mountain valleys. In the following table, it shows total different kinds of animals found in the park:

Mammals	Reptiles	Amphibians	Insects	Birds	Fishes
50	18	13	780	151	12

In the past, many of these species became endangered due to over-hunting; but with the establishment of the Yushan National Park, they are gradually making a comeback. Larger mammals such as the black bear, sambar deer, Taiwan macaque, and serows can sometimes be seen, and their call is often heard.

The National Park is an important nesting ground for the Taiwanese population of Mountain hawk-eagle.

== Cultural heritage ==
Prehistoric relics, such as stone tools and pottery, found in the Wangshiang (望鄉) and Dongpu (Tungpu;東埔) areas, provide evidence of early human occupation. The Bunun (布農), an aboriginal tribe, presently inhabits the villages of Dongpu (Tungpu;東埔) and Meishan (梅山). They emigrated from the coastal plains to the mountains some 300 years ago. Another tribal people, Tsou, who live in the west of the park, have been largely assimilated by the Bunun. Displacement of aboriginals by settlers occurred during the Qing dynasty with the construction of the Batongguan Trail in 1875 for defense purposes. Some stone steps, walls and guard-posts are the remains from that past.

== Eco-tourism ==
To promote eco-tourism, the park has established protection laws and raised public awareness of the importance of nature conservation on one hand and provided public facilities for easy access on the other hand. Public facilities provided in the park include:

Foot paths (metres)	Parking lots	Pedestrian protective rails (metres)	Suspension bridges	Rest rooms	Sewage treatment plants	Tourist centers	Training centers
39,880	17	1,111	18	13	2	3	1

For public safety, a lot of bridges and wooden pathways have been installed on difficult terrain.

There are three visitor centers in the park:

- Tataka Visitor Center
- Nanan Visitor Center
- Meishan Visitor Center

== Pictures ==
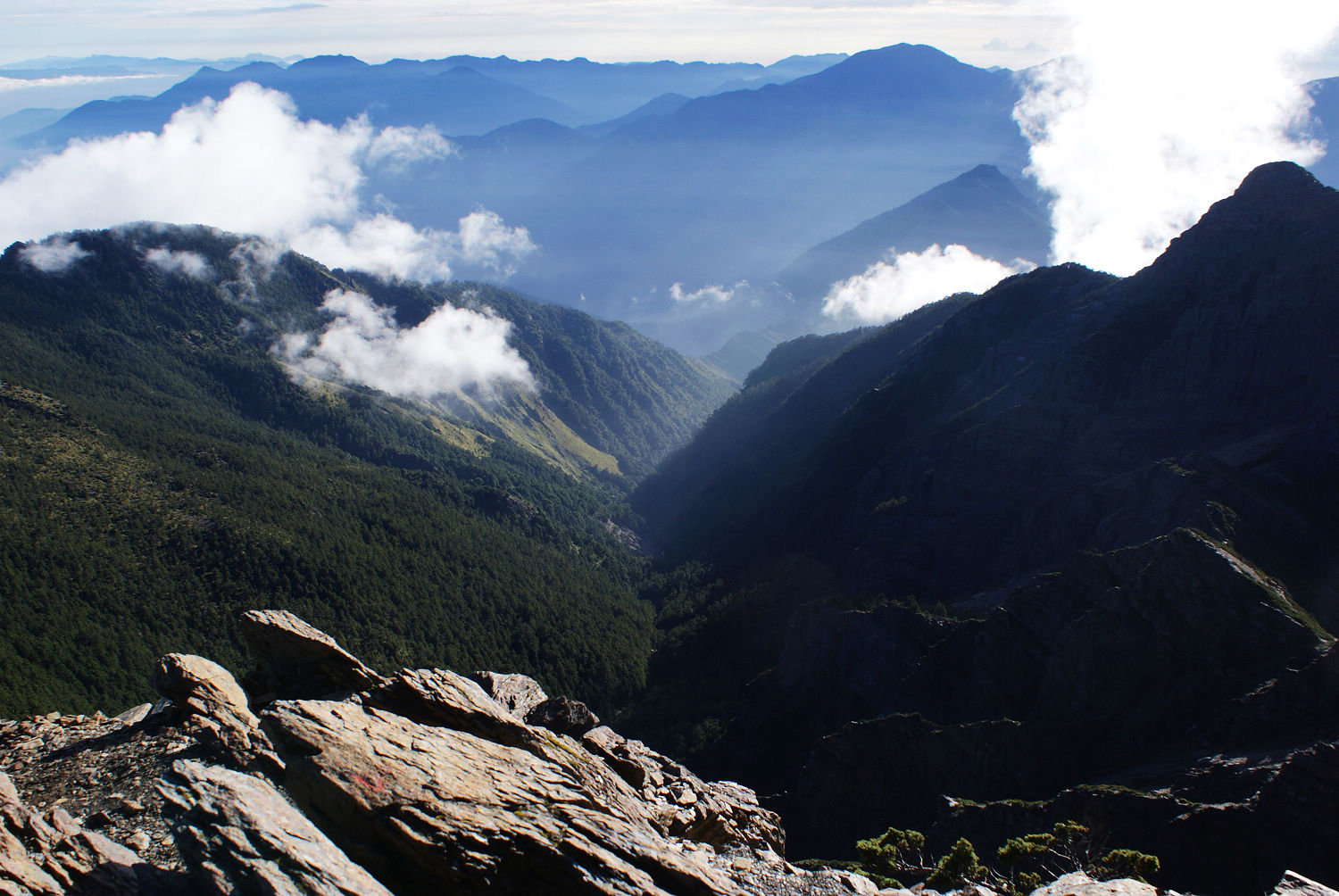
Laonung River at the northeastern side of Yushan

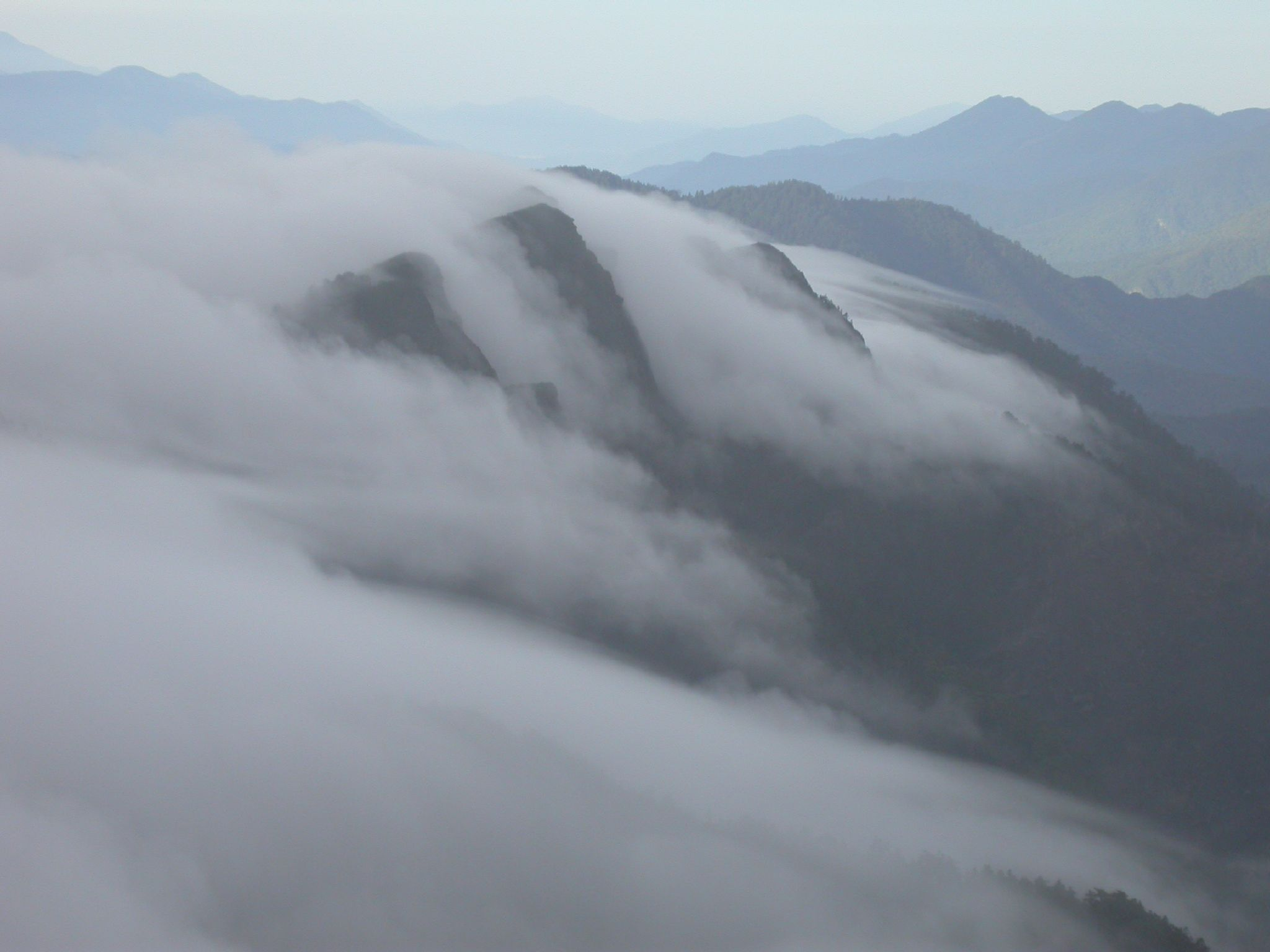
Sea of clouds near Yushan

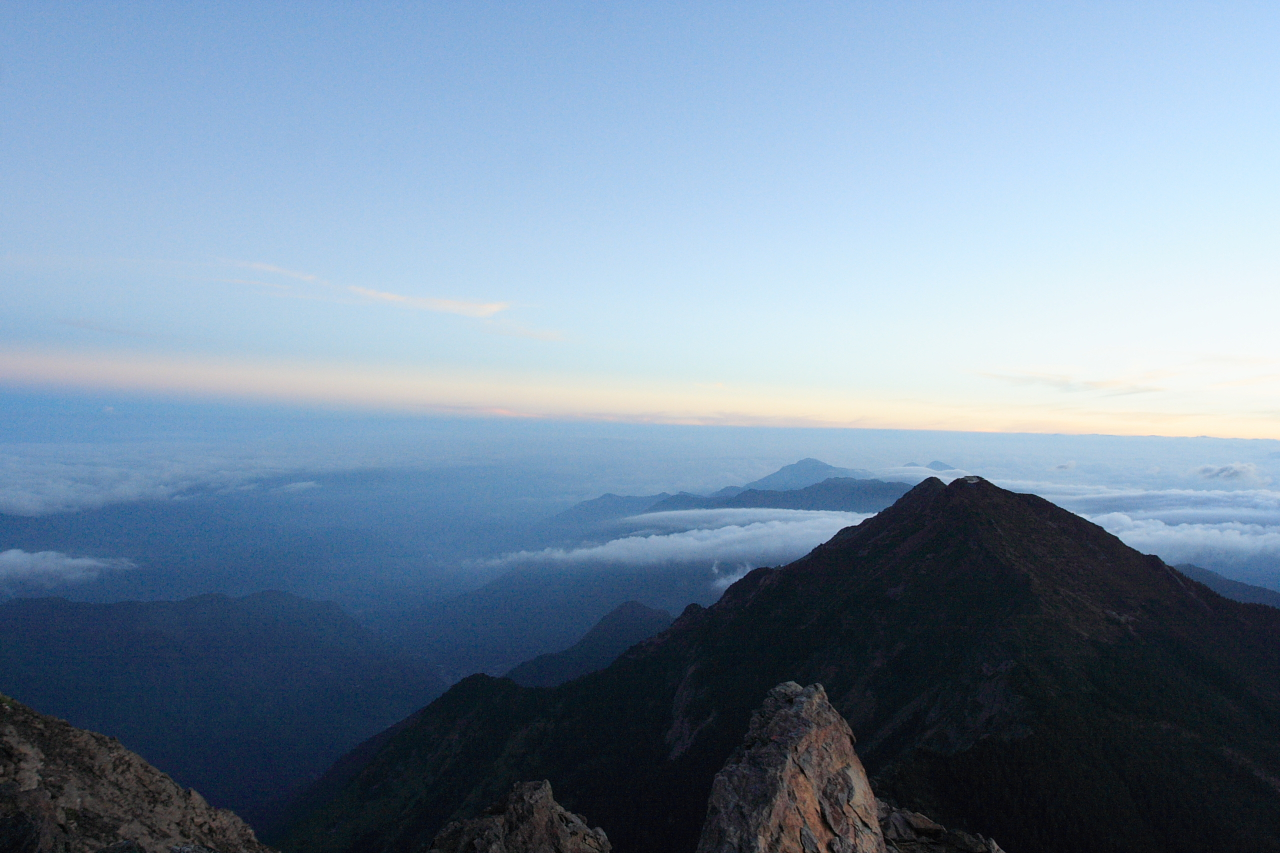
Sea of clouds on Yushan Trail

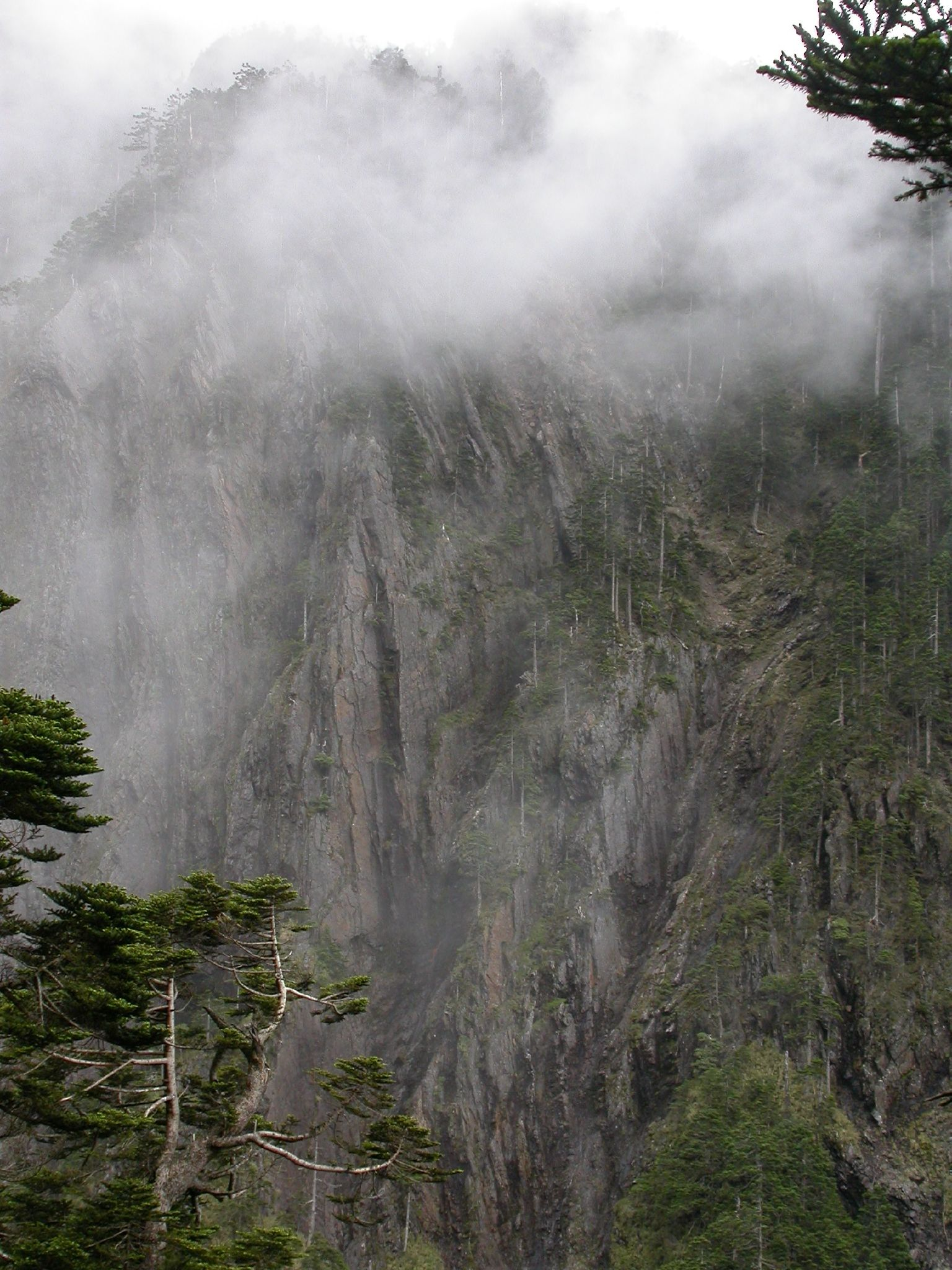
Sea of clouds near Tatajia Anbu on Yushan Trail

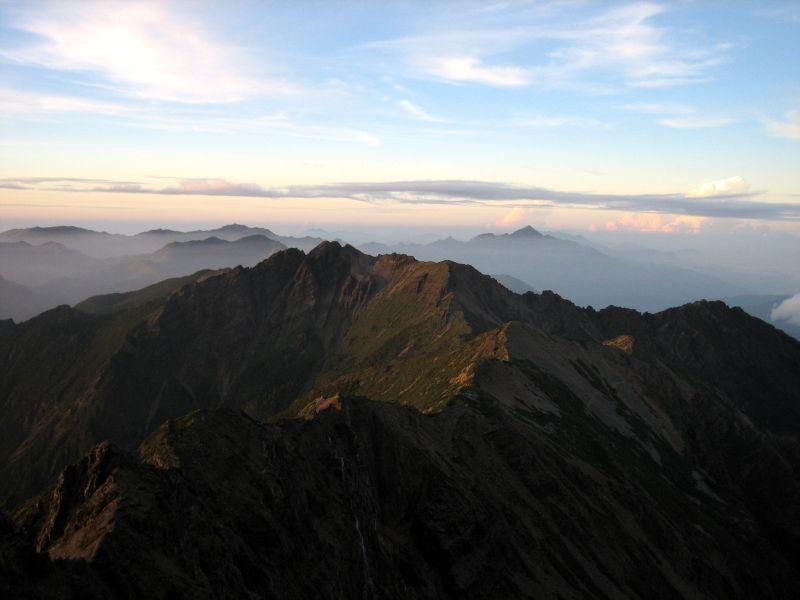
Sun rise at Yushan

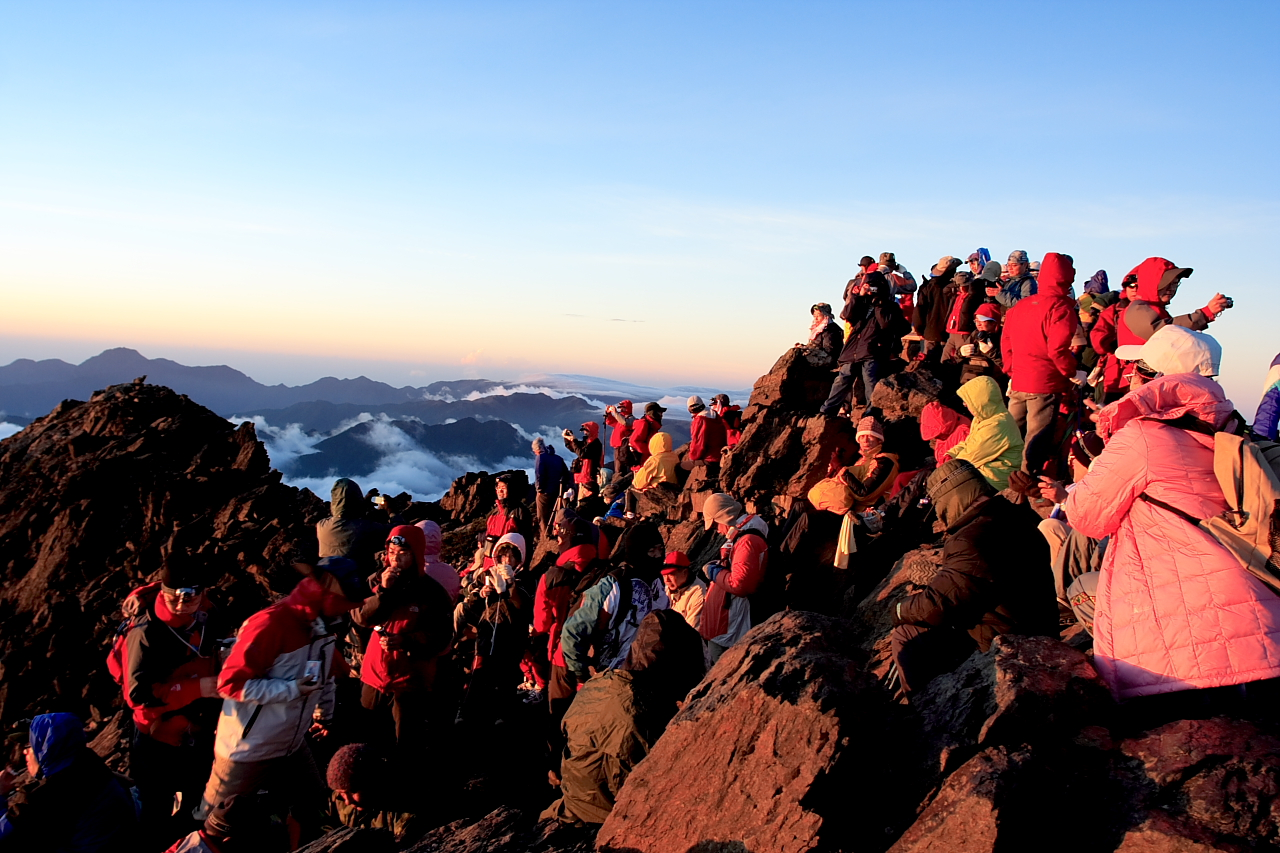
On top of the world

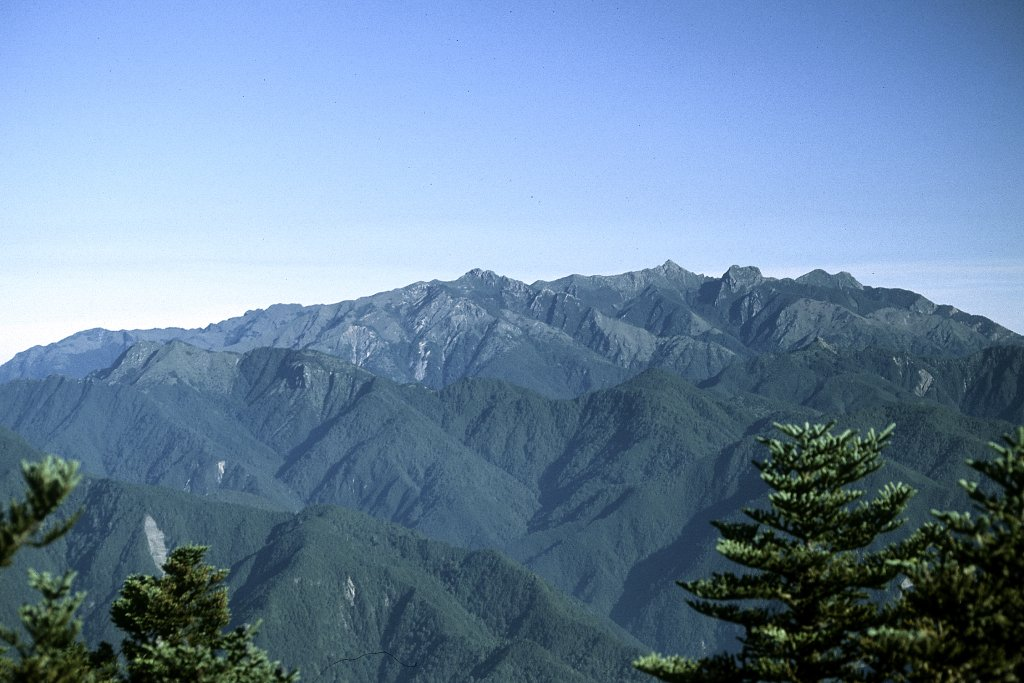
Yushan Range, eastern side view

== See also ==
- Taiwan
- Yushan
- Yushan Range
- List of mountains in Taiwan
- List of islands by highest point
