= Yakou (mountain pass) =

Mountain pass in Taiwan

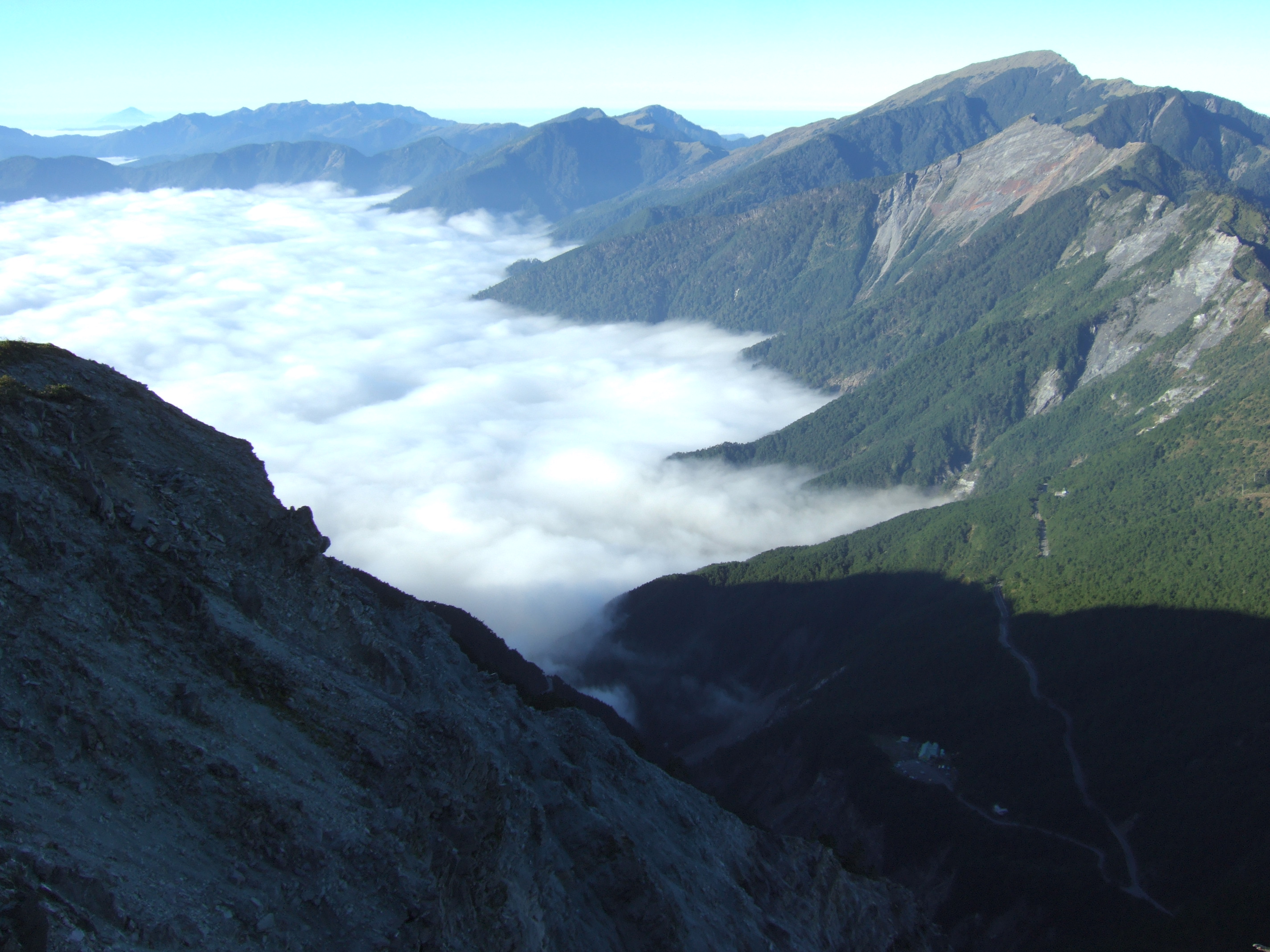
- Yakou between Mount Xiangyang (left) and Mount Guan (right)

- Location within Taiwan
- Elevation: 2,722 metres (8,930 ft)
- Traversed by: Provincial Highway 20

Third Approach
- Location: Border of Taoyuan, Kaohsiung and Haiduan, Taitung, Taiwan
- Range: Central Mountain Range
- Coordinates: 23°15′52″N 120°57′27″E

Yakou (Chinese: 埡口; pinyin: Yàkǒu), also known as Guanshan Pass (Chinese: 關山埡口; pinyin: Guānshān Yàkǒu) or Daguanshan Pass (Chinese: 大關山埡口; pinyin: Dàguānshān Yàkǒu), is a mountain pass in Taiwan transversing the Central Mountain Range within Yushan National Park. The name Yakou literally means "mountain pass". At the peak, there is a short, one-way named the Daguanshan Tunnel, which is the highest tunnel in Taiwan. Administratively, it is located at the border of Taoyuan, Kaohsiung and Haiduan, Taitung.

Yakou is known its frequent sea of clouds on the east side due to orographic lift from the Pacific Ocean. However, due to severe road collapses following Typhoon Morakot in 2009, Yakou is currently inaccessible by car.

Occasionally, the character "啞" (yǎ) is used in place of 埡 since the latter is a rarely used character.

== History ==
Initially, a path made by the Bunun people ran through Yakou. During Japan's occupation of Taiwan, the path was widened to better govern the aboriginal population in the mountains. After Japan left the island, the path was widened into the Southern Cross-Island Highway. Construction ran between 1968 and 1972, and construction workers established a campsite near Yakou; the site of the campsite became a hostel operated by the China Youth Corps.

After Typhoon Morakot in 2009, multiple sections of the Southern Cross-Island Highway collapsed from the heavy rainfall. Immediately east of Yakou, a landslide buried Daguanshan Tunnel's east entrance and its adjacent parking lot and destroyed 300 m of highway. Though not as heavily affected, the hostel closed down after the typhoon.

The section of the highway from Meishan to the west and Xiangyang to the east was closed to outside traffic after the typhoon and remains closed to this day. The highway is expected to reopen in 2021.

== Geology ==
The rock around Yakou is primarily composed of a stratum composed of argillite, another of shale, and a third of slate and phyllite. Due to the parallel planes of weakness present in the rocks, Yakou and the rest of the Southern Cross-Island Highway is very prone to landslides and failures even before Typhoon Morakot in 2009, and reconstruction has proven to be very difficult.
