= List of mountains in Taiwan =

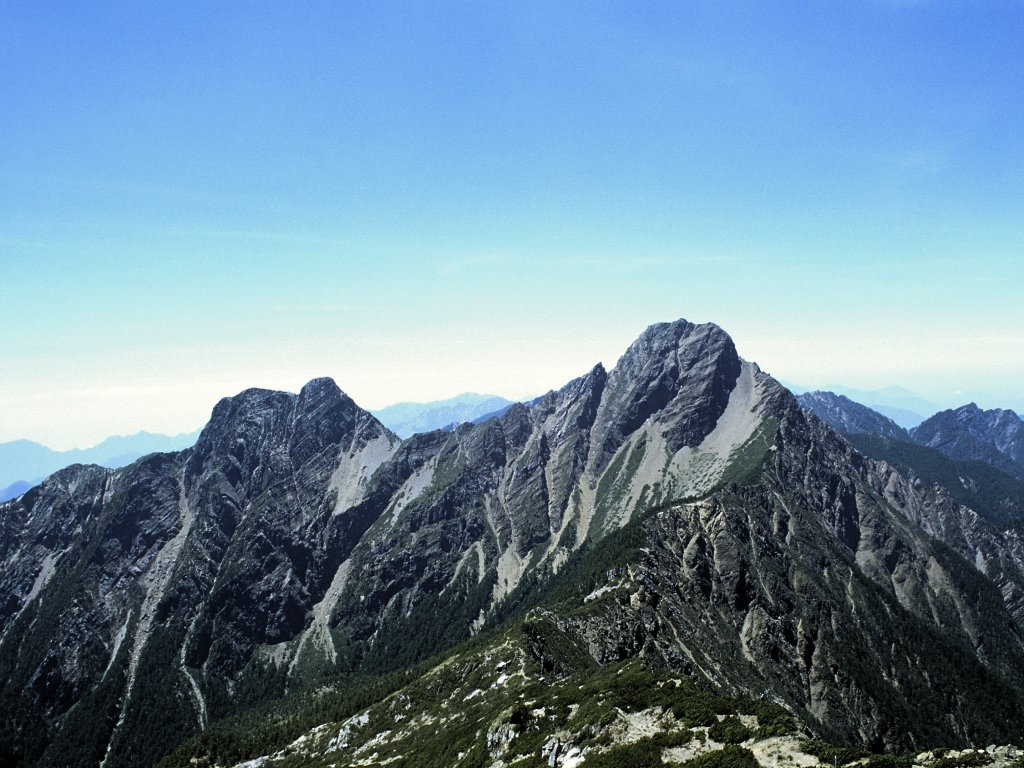
Taiwan is a mountainous island. The highest mountain is Jade Mountain, seen here from the north peak. The main peak reaches the height of 3,952 m (12,966 ft), that is, nearly 4 km (2.5 mi) high.

The island of Taiwan has the largest number and density of high mountains in the world. This article summarizes the list of mountains that is under the Republic of China's territorial jurisdiction.

There are 268 mountain peaks over 3,000 m (9,800 ft) above sea level on the island, with Yushan (Jade Mountain – in Chinese) being the tallest mountain in both Taiwan and East Asia. Mountaineering is one of the most popular activities for many Taiwanese. A list of 100 Peaks of Taiwan was created in 1971, which lists the selected one hundred mountain peaks over 3,000 m for mountaineering on the island. Climbing all of the one hundred mountain peaks listed is considered a great challenge for Taiwanese climbers.

== Mountain ranges ==
There are five mountain ranges in the main island of Taiwan

Name	Chinese	Taiwanese	Hakka	Highest point
Central Mountain Range	中央山脈	Tiong-iong Soaⁿ-me̍h	Tûng-ông Sân-ma̍k	3,825 m (12,549 ft) — Xiuguluan Mountain
Yushan Range	玉山山脈	Gio̍k-san Soaⁿ-me̍h	Ngiu̍k-Sân Sân-ma̍k	3,952 m (12,966 ft) — Jade Mountain
Xueshan Range	雪山山脈	Suat-soaⁿ Soaⁿ-me̍h	Siet-sân Sân-ma̍k	3,886 m (12,749 ft) — Snow Mountain
Alishan Range	阿里山山脈	A-lí-san Soaⁿ-me̍h	Â-lî-sân Sân-ma̍k	2,663 m (8,737 ft) — Data Mountain
Hai'an Range	海岸山脈	Hái-hōaⁿ Soaⁿ-me̍h	Hói-ngan Sân-ma̍k	1,682 m (5,518 ft) — Xingang Mountain

== List of high mountains ==
=== Over 3,000 m ===
Rank	Name	Height	Location	Range
1	Yushan (Mount Morrison, Jade Mountain, Mount Yu) 玉山 – Main Peak 主峰, Eastern Small Peak 東側副峰, Sancha Peak 三叉峰 (三岔峰), Eastern Peak 東峰, Northern Peak 北峰, Southern Peak 南峰, Northern Small Peak 北北峰, Southern Sancha Peak 南三叉峰 (南三岔峰), Yuan Peak 圓峰, Southern Small Peak 小南峰, Western Peak 西峰, Front Peak 前峰	3,952 m (12,966 ft), 3,945 m (12,943 ft), 3,900 m (12,795 ft), 3,869 m (12,694 ft), 3,858 m (12,657 ft), 3,844 m (12,612 ft), 3,833 m (12,575 ft), 3,807 m (12,490 ft), 3,752 m (12,310 ft), 3,582 m (11,752 ft), 3,490 m (11,450 ft), 3,239 m (10,627 ft)	Xinyi, Nantou	Yushan
2	Xueshan (Mount Sylvia, Snow Mountain, Xue or Hsueh Mountain, Mount Xue or Hsueh) 雪山 – Main Peak 主峰, Northern Small Peak (Beilengjiao Peak) 北角峰 (北稜角峰), Northern Peak 北峰, Southern Peak 南峰, Southwestern Peak 西南峰, Western Peak 西峰, Triangulation Point Peak of Western Peak 西峰基點峰, Eastern Peak 東峰	3,886 m (12,749 ft), 3,880 m (12,730 ft), 3,703 m (12,149 ft), 3,500 m (11,483 ft), 3,471 m (11,388 ft), 3,265 m (10,712 ft), 3,260 m (10,696 ft), 3,201 m (10,502 ft)	Heping District, Taichung	Xueshan
3	Xiuguluan Mountain (Xiuguluanshan, Mount Siouguluan, Mahudas Mountain) 秀姑巒山 (馬霍拉斯山)	3,825 m (12,549 ft)	Xinyi, Nantou	Central
4	Mabolasi Mountain (Ulamun Mountain) 馬博拉斯山 (烏拉孟山)	3,785 m (12,418 ft)	Xinyi, Nantou	Central
5	Nanhu Mountain 南湖大山 – Main Peak 主峰, Eastern Peak 東峰, Northern Peak 北峰, Middle-South Peak 中南峰, Northeastern Peak 東北峰, Southern Peak 南峰, Southeastern Peak 東南峰	3,742 m (12,277 ft), 3,632 m (11,916 ft), 3,592 m (11,785 ft), 3,565 m (11,696 ft), 3,550 m (11,647 ft), 3,470 m (11,385 ft), 3,462 m (11,358 ft)	Heping, Taichung	Central
6	Kailantekun Mountain 凱蘭特崑山 – Main Peak 主峰, Northern Peak (Kailantekunbei Mountain) 北峰 (凱蘭特崑北山)	3,730 m (12,238 ft), 3,680 m (12,073 ft)	Heping, Taichung	Xueshan
7	Dongxiaonan Mountain 東小南山	3,711 m (12,175 ft)	Tauyuan District, Kaohsiung	Yushan
8	Central Range Point (Zhongyangjian Mountain) 中央尖山 – Main Peak 主峰, Eastern Peak 東峰, Western Peak 西峰	3,705 m (12,156 ft), 3,580 m (11,745 ft), 3,412 m (11,194 ft)	Heping, Taichung	Central
9	Guan Mountain (Guanshan, Mount Guan) 關山 – Main Peak 主峰, Northern Peak 北峰	3,668 m (12,034 ft), 3,429 m (11,250 ft)	Tauyuan, Kaohsiung	Central
10	Matelan Mountain (Ganmulin Mountain) 馬特蘭山 (甘木林山)	3,660 m (12,008 ft)	Heping, Taichung	Xueshan
11	Dashuiku Mountain 大水窟山 – Main Peak 主峰, Northern Peak 北峰	3,630 m (11,909 ft), 3,628 m (11,903 ft)	Xinyi, Nantou	Central
12	Mutelebu Mountain 穆特勒布山	3,626 m (11,896 ft)	Tai'an, Miaoli	Xueshan
13	Dongjun Mountain 東郡大山	3,619 m (11,873 ft)	Xinyi, Nantou	Central
14	Cuichisancha Mountain (Cuichi Mountain) 翠池三叉山 (翠池三岔山, 翠池山)	3,610 m (11,844 ft)	Heping, Taichung	Xueshan
15	Qilai Mountain 奇萊(主)山 – Northern Peak 北峰, Main Peak 主峰, Eastern Peak 東峰, Southern Peak 南峰, Southern Small Peak 南南峰	3,608 m (11,837 ft), 3,560 m (11,680 ft), 3,396 m (11,142 ft), 3,358 m (11,017 ft), 3,313 m (10,869 ft)	Xiulin, Hualien	Central
16	Xiangyang Mountain 向陽山 – Main Peak 主峰, Northern Peak (Siangyangbei Mountain) 北峰 (向陽北山)	3,603 m (11,821 ft), 3,430 m (11,253 ft)	Tauyuan, Kaohsiung	Central
17	Dajian Mountain 大劍山	3,594 m (11,791 ft)	Heping, Taichung	Xueshan
18	Cloud Peak (Yun fong / Peak / Mountain, Mount Yun) 雲峰 – Main Peak 主峰, Middle Peak 中峰, Eastern Peak 東峰, Northeastern Peak 東北峰	3,564 m (11,693 ft), 3,510 m (11,516 ft), 3,404 m (11,168 ft), 3,255 m (10,679 ft)	Tauyuan, Kaohsiung	Central
19	Malijianan Mountain (Tabila Mountain) 馬利加南山 (塔比拉山) – Main Peak 主峰, Eastern Peak (Malijianandong Mountain) 東峰 (馬利加南東山), Northern Peak (Malijiananbei Mountain) 北峰 (馬利加南北山)	3,546 m (11,634 ft), 3,358 m (11,017 ft), 3,113 m (10,213 ft)	Zhuoxi, Hualien	Central
20	Nanhubei Mountain 南湖北山	3,536 m (11,601 ft)	Heping, Taichung	Central
21	Daxue Mountain 大雪山, Main Peak 主峰, Southern Peak 南峰, Northern Peak 北峰	3,530 m (11,581 ft), 3,490 m (11,450 ft), 3,437 m (11,276 ft)	Heping, Taichung	Xueshan
22	Pintian Mountain 品田山 – Main Peak 主峰, Front Peak 前峰	3,524 m (11,562 ft), 3,442 m (11,293 ft)	Heping, Taichung	Xueshan
23	Kelekele'an Mountain 可樂可樂安山	3,520 m (11,549 ft)	Xinyi, Nantou	Central
24	Qijun Mountain 奇峻山	3,519 m (11,545 ft)	Heping, Taichung	Xueshan
25	Sumida Mountain 素密達山	3,517 m (11,539 ft)	Taian, Miaoli	Xueshan
26	Wudapei Mountain (Yudapei Mountain) 烏達佩山 (宇達佩山)	3,512 m (11,522 ft)	Xinyi, Nantou	Central
27	Touying Mountain 頭鷹山 – Main Peak 主峰, Northern Peak 北峰	3,510 m (11,516 ft), 3,256 m (10,682 ft)	Heping, Taichung	Xueshan
28	Taosai Peak (Mountain) 陶塞峰 (山)	3,500 m (11,483 ft)	Nan'ao, Yilan	Central
29	Sancha Mountain 三叉山 (三岔山)	3,496 m (11,470 ft)	Tauyuan, Kaohsiung	Central
30	Dabajian Mountain (Dominating Sharp Mountain) 大霸尖山	3,492 m (11,457 ft)	Jianshi, Hsinchu	Xueshan
31	Maliyawenlu Mountain 馬里亞文路山 – Main Peak 主峰, Eastern Peak 東峰, Northern Peak 北峰	3,483 m (11,427 ft), 3,444 m (11,299 ft), 3,210 m (10,531 ft)	Xinyi, Nantou	Central
32	Jundong Mountain 郡東山	3,477 m (11,407 ft)	Xinyi, Nantou	Central
33	Dongluan Mountain 東巒大山	3,468 m (11,378 ft)	Xinyi, Nantou	Central
34	Wuming Mountain 無明山 – Main Peak 主峰, Western Peak 西峰, Eastern Peak 東峰	3,451 m (11,322 ft), 3,200 m (10,499 ft), 3,187 m (10,456 ft)	Heping, Taichung	Central
35	Baba Mountain 巴巴山 – Main Peak 主峰, Southern Peak 南峰	3,449 m (11,316 ft), 3,277 m (10,751 ft)	Heping, Taichung	Central
36	Benxiang Mountain 本鄉山 – Main Peak 主峰, Western Peak 西峰	3,447 m (11,309 ft), 3,061 m (10,043 ft)	Xinyi, Nantou	Central
37	Maxi Mountain 馬西山 – Main Peak 主峰, Southern Peak 南峰, Northern Peak 北峰	3,443 m (11,296 ft), 3,220 m (10,564 ft), 3,185 m (10,449 ft)	Zhuoxi, Hualien	Central
38	Pipida Mountain 匹匹達山	3,440 m (11,286 ft)	Heping, Taichung	Xueshan
39	Buxiulan Mountain 布秀蘭山	3,438 m (11,280 ft)	Taian, Miaoli	Xueshan
40	Zhu Mountain (Chu Mountain) 櫧山 (儲山)	3,437 m (11,276 ft)	Xinyi, Nantou	Central
41	Jupen Mountain 駒盆山 – Southern Peak 南峰, Middle Peak 中峰, Main Peak 主峰	3,432 m (11,260 ft), 3,157 m (10,358 ft), 3,109 m (10,200 ft)	Xinyi, Nantou	Central
42	Qilaichi Mountain 奇萊池山	3,430 m (11,253 ft)	Xiulin, Hualien	Central
43	Hehuan Mountain (Hehuanshan, Mount Hehuan) 合歡山 – Northern Peak (Beihehuan Mountain) 北峰 (北合歡山), Eastern Peak 東峰, Main Peak 主峰	3,422 m (11,227 ft), 3,421 m (11,224 ft), 3,417 m (11,211 ft)	Xiulin, Hualien	Central
44	Xiaobajian Mountain 小霸尖山	3,418 m (11,214 ft)	Taian, Miaoli	Xueshan
45	Fuwan Mountain 釜碗山 – Western Peak 西峰, Main Peak 主峰	3,417 m (11,211 ft), 3,000 m (9,843 ft)	Heping, Taichung	Xueshan
46	Tiannankelang Mountain (Tiannankelan Mountain) 天南克朗山 (天南可蘭山)	3,404 m (11,168 ft)	Xinyi, Nantou	Central
47	Bashalayun Mountain 巴紗拉雲山	3,402 m (11,161 ft)	Jianshi, Hsinchu	Xueshan
48	Zhongbajian Mountain 中霸尖山	3,392 m (11,129 ft)	Jianshi, Hsinchu	Xueshan
49	Buchenxilun Mountain 布陳西崙山	3,384 m (11,102 ft)	Heping, Taichung	Xueshan
50	Qilaili Mountain 奇萊裡山	3,383 m (11,099 ft)	Xiulin, Hualien	Central
50	Nanyu Mountain 南玉山	3,383 m (11,099 ft)	Tauyuan, Kaohsiung	Yushan
52	Nadashuiku Mountain 南大水窟山	3,381 m (11,093 ft)	Xinyi, Nantou	Central
53	Guimenguan Peak (Mountain) 鬼門關峰 (山)	3,380 m (11,089 ft)	Heping, Taichung	Central
53	Kaluolou Mountain 卡羅樓山	3,380 m (11,089 ft)	Xiulin, Hualien	Central
55	Gongshui Mountain 弓水山	3,374 m (11,070 ft)	Heping, Taichung	Xueshan
56	Bilu Mountain (Bilyu Mountain) 畢祿山 (碧綠山) – Main Peak 主峰, Southern Peak 南峰	3,371 m (11,060 ft), 3,041 m (9,977 ft)	Xiulin, Hualien	Central
57	Zhuoshe Mountain 卓社大山 – Main Peak 主峰, Eastern Peak 東峰	3,369 m (11,053 ft), 3,240 m (10,630 ft)	Ren'ai, Nantou	Central
58	Dongbajian Mountain 東霸尖山	3,360 m (11,024 ft)	Jianshi, Hsinchu	Xueshan
58	Nanshuangtou Mountain 南雙頭山 – Eastern Peak 東峰, Main Peak 主峰	3,360 m (11,024 ft), 3,356 m (11,010 ft)	Tauyuan, Kaohsiung	Central
60	Nenggao Mountain 能高山 – Southern Peak 南峰, Main Peak 主峰, Northern Peak (Nanhua Mountain) 北峰 (南華山)	3,349 m (10,988 ft), 3,262 m (10,702 ft), 3,184 m (10,446 ft)	Ren'ai, Nantou	Central
61	Huangdangkuo Mountain 黃當擴山 – Southern Peak (Huangdangkuonan Mountain) 南峰 (黃當擴南山), Main Peak 主峰, Middle Peak 中峰	3,348 m (10,984 ft), 3,196 m (10,486 ft), 3,172 m (10,407 ft)	Xinyi, Nantou	Central
62	Badufu Mountain 巴都服山	3,345 m (10,974 ft)	Datong, Yilan	Central
63	Baigu Mountain (Baigou Mountain) 白姑大山 (白狗大山) – Main Peak 主峰, Western Peak 西峰, Sancha Peak 三叉峰 (三岔峰), Southwestern Peak 西南峰, Middle Peak 中峰, Eastern Peak 東峰, Southeastern Peak 東南峰	3,341 m (10,961 ft), 3,251 m (10,666 ft), 3,200 m (10,499 ft), 3,171 m (10,404 ft), 3,049 m (10,003 ft), 3,036 m (9,961 ft), 3,033 m (9,951 ft)	Ren'ai, Nantou	Xueshan
64	Dan Mountain 丹大山 – Main Peak 主峰, Eastern Peak 東峰	3,340 m (10,958 ft), 3,140 m (10,302 ft)	Xinyi, Nantou	Central
64	Zhijiayang Mountain 志佳陽大山 – Main Peak 主峰, Triangulation Point Peak 基點峰	3,340 m (10,958 ft), 3,289 m (10,791 ft)	Heping, Taichung	Xueshan
64	Limen Mountain 裡門山	3,340 m (10,958 ft)	Xinyi, Nantou	Central
67	Bugan Mountain 布干山	3,339 m (10,955 ft)	Zhuoxi, Hualien	Central
68	Batongguan Mountain 八通關山 – Main Peak 主峰, Western Peak 西峰, Eastern Peak 東峰	3,335 m (10,942 ft), 3,245 m (10,646 ft), 3,181 m (10,436 ft)	Xinyi, Nantou	Central
68	Panshi Mountain 磐石山 – Western Peak 西峰, Middle Peak 中峰, Main Peak 主峰	3,335 m (10,942 ft), 3,154 m (10,348 ft), 3,106 m (10,190 ft)	Xiulin, Hualien	Central
70	Xinkang Mountain 新康山	3,331 m (10,928 ft)	Zhuoxi, Hualien	Central
71	Manaike Mountain 馬乃可山	3,326 m (10,912 ft)	unknown	unknown
72	Tao Mountain 桃山	3,325 m (10,909 ft)	Heping, Taichung	Xueshan
73	Tiangongbaolei Mountain 天宮堡壘山	3,315 m (10,876 ft)	Zhuoxi, Hualien	Central
74	Jiayang Mountain 佳陽山	3,314 m (10,873 ft)	Heping, Taichung	Xueshan
75	Duanlengxi Mountain 斷稜西山	3,313 m (10,869 ft)	Xinyi, Nantou	Central
76	Huoshi Mountain 火石山	3,310 m (10,860 ft)	Heping, Taichung	Xueshan
77	Wangyai Mountain 望崖山	3,307 m (10,850 ft)	Xinyi, Nantou	Central
78	Chiyou Mountain 池有山	3,303 m (10,837 ft)	Heping, Taichung	Xueshan
79	Yize Mountain 伊澤山	3,297 m (10,817 ft)	Jianshi, Hsinchu	Xueshan
80	Beinan Mountain 卑南主山 – Main Peak 主峰, Northern Peak 北峰, Northwestern Peak 西北峰, Southern Peak (Beinannan Mountain) 南峰 (卑南南山), Eastern Peak 東峰, Western Peak 西峰	3,295 m (10,810 ft), 3,267 m (10,719 ft), 3,230 m (10,597 ft), 3,180 m (10,433 ft), 3,050 m (10,007 ft), 3,030 m (9,941 ft)	Tauyuan, Kaohsiung	Central
81	Bufuqihan Mountain 布伕奇寒山	3,290 m (10,794 ft)	Heping, Taichung	Xueshan
81	Duanlengdong Mountain 斷稜東山	3,290 m (10,794 ft)	Xinyi, Nantou	Central
81	Ju Mountain 鋸山 – Main Peak 主峰, Eastern Peak 東峰	3,290 m (10,794 ft), 3,035 m (9,957 ft)	Xiulin, Hualien	Central
81	Mobaolai Mountain 魔保來山 ( 魔堡來山)	3,290 m (10,794 ft)	Tauyuan, Kaohsiung	Central
85	Ganzhuowan Mountain 干卓萬山 – Main Peak 主峰, Sancha Peak 三叉峰 (三岔峰), Southeastern Peak 東南峰	3,284 m (10,774 ft), 3,241 m (10,633 ft), 3,130 m (10,269 ft)	Ren'ai, Nantou	Central
86	Taroko Mountain (Tailuge Mountain) 太魯閣大山 – Main Peak 主峰, Western Peak 西峰	3,283 m (10,771 ft), 3,121 m (10,240 ft)	Xiulin, Hualien	Central
87	Jiannanjian Mountain 劍南尖山	3,280 m (10,761 ft)	Heping, Taichung	Xueshan
88	Lulu Mountain 轆轆山 – Main Peak 主峰, Eastern Peak 東峰, Southern Peak 南峰	3,279 m (10,758 ft), 3,240 m (10,630 ft), 3,089 m (10,135 ft)	Tauyuan, Kaohsiung	Central
89	Kexipanan Mountain 喀西帕南山 – Main Peak 主峰, Northern Small Peak (Beigaoping Peak) 北高坪峰, Western Peak 西峰, Southern Peak 南峰, Northern Peak 北峰	3,276 m (10,748 ft), 3,264 m (10,709 ft), 3,187 m (10,456 ft), 3,165 m (10,384 ft), 3,022 m (9,915 ft)	Zhuoxi, Hualien	Central
90	Lingming Mountain 鈴鳴山	3,272 m (10,735 ft)	Heping, Taichung	Central
90	Xitou Mountain 溪頭山	3,272 m (10,735 ft)	Tauyuan, Kaohsiung	Central
92	Neiling′er Mountain 內嶺爾山	3,270 m (10,728 ft)	Zhuoxi, Hualien	Central
92	Shimen Mountain 石門山 – Northern Peak 北峰, Main Peak 主峰	3,270 m (10,728 ft), 3,237 m (10,620 ft)	Xiulin, Hualien	Central
94	Jun Mountain 郡大山 – Northern Peak 北峰, Main Peak 主峰	3,263 m (10,705 ft), 3,250 m (10,663 ft)	Xinyi, Nantou	Yushan
95	Yingzizui Mountain 鷹子嘴山	3,262 m (10,702 ft)	Tauyuan, Kaohsiung	Central
96	Wandong Mountain 萬東山 – Western Peak 西峰	3,258 m (10,689 ft)	Ren'ai, Nantou	Central
97	Jian Mountain (Xiaojian Mountain) 劍山 (小劍山)	3,253 m (10,673 ft)	Heping, Taichung	Xueshan
98	Malubalarang Mountain 馬路巴拉讓山 – Main Peak 主峰, Western Peak 西峰	3,250 m (10,663 ft), 3,200 m (10,499 ft)	Zhuoxi, Hualien	Central
99	Pingfeng Mountain 屏風山 – Main Peak 主峰, Middle Peak 中峰, Southern Peak 南峰	3,250 m (10,663 ft), 3,243 m (10,640 ft), 3,183 m (10,443 ft)	Xiulin, Hualien	Central
100	Shangzhizhu Mountain 上躑躅山	3,250 m (10,663 ft)	unknown	unknown
101	Xiaoguan Mountain 小關山 – Main Peak 主峰, Northern Peak 北峰	3,249 m (10,659 ft), 3,239 m (10,627 ft)	Tauyuan, Kaohsiung	Central
102	Yixiqingmazhi Mountain 義西請馬至山	3,245 m (10,646 ft)	Xinyi, Nantou	Central
103	Mu Mountain 牧山	3,241 m (10,633 ft)	Ren'ai, Nantou	Central
103	Wangxiang Mountain 望鄉山	3,241 m (10,633 ft)	Xinyi, Nantou	Yushan
105	Danan Mountain 大南山 – Main Peak 主峰, Northern Peak 北峰	3,239 m (10,627 ft), 3,148 m (10,328 ft)	Heping, Taichung	Xueshan
106	Wushuang Mountain 無雙山 – Main Peak 主峰, Eastern Peak 東峰	3,231 m (10,600 ft), 3,228 m (10,591 ft)	Xinyi, Nantou	Central
107	Konglongjian Mountain 恐龍尖山	3,230 m (10,597 ft)	Tauyuan, Kaohsiung	Central
108	Taguan Mountain 塔關山	3,222 m (10,571 ft)	Tauyuan, Kaohsiung	Central
109	Hehuanjian Mountain 合歡尖山	3,217 m (10,554 ft)	Xiulin, Hualien	Central
110	Mabishan Mountain 馬比杉山	3,211 m (10,535 ft)	Nan'ao, Yilan	Central
111	Hongyai Mountain 紅崖山 – Northern Peak 北峰, Main Peak 主峰	3,210 m (10,531 ft), 3,200 m (10,499 ft)	Xinyi, Nantou	Central
111	Shilun Mountain 詩崙山	3,210 m (10,531 ft)	Jianshi, Hsinchu	Xueshan
113	Youpolan Mountain 油婆蘭山	3,208 m (10,525 ft)	Heping, Taichung	Xueshan
114	Tailunaxi Mountain 太魯那斯山	3,200 m (10,499 ft)	Zhuoxi, Hualien	Central
115	Beibilu Mountain 北畢祿山	3,193 m (10,476 ft)	Xiulin, Hualien	Central
116	Yeba'ao Mountain 耶巴奧山	3,192 m (10,472 ft)	Tai'an, Miaoli	Xueshan
117	Dafenjian Mountain (Tafenjian Mountain, Jian Mountain) 達芬尖山 (塔芬尖山, 尖山) – Main Peak 主峰, Northern Peak 北峰	3,190 m (10,466 ft), 3,045 m (9,990 ft)	Xinyi, Nantou	Central
118	Guanshanling Mountain 關山嶺山	3,176 m (10,420 ft)	Tauyuan, Kaohsiung	Central
119	Hainuonan Mountain 海諾南山	3,175 m (10,417 ft)	Tauyuan, Kaohsiung	Central
119	Lulilaluo Mountain 盧利拉駱山 (廬利拉駱山) – Main Peak 主峰, Western Peak 西峰	3,175 m (10,417 ft), 3,123 m (10,246 ft)	Xinyi, Nantou	Central
121	Zhongxue Mountain 中雪山	3,173 m (10,410 ft)	Tai'an, Miaoli	Xueshan
122	Shuan Mountain 閂山	3,168 m (10,394 ft)	Heping, Taichung	Central
123	Beimian Mountain 北面山	3,167 m (10,390 ft)	Xinyi, Nantou	Central
124	Batuonuofu Mountain 拔托諾府山	3,165 m (10,384 ft)	Datong, Yilan	Central
125	Lianli Mountain 連里山 (連理山) – Western Peak 西峰, Main Peak 主峰	3,161 m (10,371 ft), 3,136 m (10,289 ft)	Zhuoxi, Hualien	Central
126	Ganshu Peak (Mountain) 甘薯峰 (山) – Main Peak 主峰, Southern Peak 南峰	3,158 m (10,361 ft), 3,157 m (10,358 ft)	Heping, Taichung	Central
127	Jiuhua Mountain 九華山 – Western Peak 西峰, Main Peak 主峰	3,155 m (10,351 ft), 3,060 m (10,039 ft)	Xinyi, Nantou	Central
128	Xihehuan Mountain 西合歡山	3,145 m (10,318 ft)	Renai, Nantou	Central
129	Shenmazhen Mountain 審馬陣山	3,141 m (10,305 ft)	Heping, Taichung	Central
130	Zhimo Mountain 志摩山 – Main Peak 主峰, Western Peak 西峰	3,140 m (10,302 ft), 3,100 m (10,171 ft)	Heping, Taichung	Xueshan
131	Kelaye Mountain 喀拉業山	3,133 m (10,279 ft)	Jianshi, Hsinchu	Xueshan
132	Xinxian Mountain 新仙山	3,120 m (10,236 ft)	Zhuoxi, Hualien	Central
133	Kuhanuoxin Mountain 庫哈諾辛山	3,115 m (10,220 ft)	Tauyuan, Kaohsiung	Central
134	Jiali Mountain 加利山	3,112 m (10,210 ft)	Taian, Miaoli	Central
135	Baishi Mountain 白石山 – Main Peak 主峰, Eastern Peak 東峰	3,110 m (10,203 ft), 3,082 m (10,112 ft)	Ren'ai, Nantou	Central
135	Rendai Mountain 人待山	3,110 m (10,203 ft)	Heping, Taichung	Central
137	Patuolu Mountain 帕托魯山	3,101 m (10,174 ft)	Xiulin, Hualien	Central
138	Kahe'er Mountain 卡賀爾山	3,100 m (10,171 ft)	Ren'ai, Nantou	Central
139	Beidawu Mountain 北大武山	3,092 m (10,144 ft)	Taiwu, Pingtung	Central
140	Zhimahan Mountain 知馬漢山 – Northern Peak 北峰	3,085 m (10,121 ft)	Heping, Taichung	Xueshan
141	Xiluan Mountain 西巒大山	3,081 m (10,108 ft)	Xinyi, Nantou	Yushan
142	Kehan Mountain 可汗山 – Main Peak 主峰, Eastern Peak 東峰	3,080 m (10,105 ft), 3,027 m (9,931 ft)	Heping, Taichung	Xueshan
143	Liwu Mountain 立霧主山	3,070 m (10,072 ft)	Xiulin, Hualien	Central
143	Tafen Mountain (Dafen Mountain) 塔芬山 (達芬山) – Main Peak 主峰, Southern Peak 南峰	3,070 m (10,072 ft), 3,017 m (9,898 ft)	Zhuoxi, Hualien	Central
145	Andongjun Mountain 安東軍山	3,068 m (10,066 ft)	Ren'ai, Nantou	Central
146	Awangnalai Mountain (Aweinalai Mountain) 阿屘那來山 ( 阿尾那來山)	3,061 m (10,043 ft)	Wanrong, Hualien	Central
147	Guangtou Mountain 光頭山	3,060 m (10,039 ft)	Renai, Nantou	Central
148	Puluoxikuo Mountain 僕落西擴山	3,055 m (10,023 ft)	Xinyi, Nantou	Central
149	Linzhuan Mountain 林專山	3,053 m (10,016 ft)	Tai'an, Miaoli	Xueshan
150	Shuangzi Mountain 雙子山	3,049 m (10,003 ft)	Xinyi, Nantou	Central
152	Qingshui Mountain 清水山 – Main Peak 主峰, Southern Peak 南峰	3,048 m (10,000 ft), 3,018 m (9,902 ft)	Xinyi, Nantou	Yushan
151	Yusui Mountain 玉穗山	3,045 m (9,990 ft)	Tauyuan, Kaohsiung	Central
152	Abala Mountain 阿巴拉山	3,044 m (9,987 ft)	Wanrong, Hualien	Central
153	Yangtou Mountain 羊頭山	3,035 m (9,957 ft)	Xiulin, Hualien	Central
154	Wumeilangpang Mountain 烏妹浪胖山	3,031 m (9,944 ft)	Xinyi, Nantou	Central
155	Dashigong Mountain 大石公山	3,030 m (9,941 ft)	Wanrong, Hualien	Central
156	Bashawan Mountain 巴沙灣山	3,029 m (9,938 ft)	Xiulin, Hualien	Central
157	Guanmen Mountain 關門山 – Northern Peak (Guanmenbei Mountain) 北峰 (關門北山)	3,022 m (9,915 ft)	Wanrong, Hualien	Central
157	Maxibaxiu Mountain 馬西巴秀山	3,022 m (9,915 ft)	Tauyuan, Kaohsiung	Central
157	Wukedongke Mountain (Wumakedong Mountain) 烏可冬克山 ( 烏馬克冬山)	3,022 m (9,915 ft)	Xinyi, Nantou	Central
160	Bulakesang Mountain 布拉克桑山	3,020 m (9,908 ft)	Zhuoxi, Hualien	Central
161	Dalishi Peak (Mountain) 大理石峰 (山)	3,014 m (9,888 ft)	Wanrong, Hualien	Central
162	Yunshui Mountain 雲水山	3,013 m (9,885 ft)	Tauyuan, Kaohsiung	Central
163	Jinzi Mountain (Jyunkeng Mountain) 金子山 (郡坑山)	3,005 m (9,859 ft)	Xinyi, Nantou	Yushan
164	Liushun Mountain 六順山	3,000 m (9,843 ft)	Wanrong, Hualien	Central
164	Xiazhizhu Mountain (Zhizhu Mountain) 下躑躅山 (躑躅山)	3,000 m (9,843 ft)	Xinyi, Nantou	Central

Notes:

- The rank and locations is that of the highest peak of each mountain.
- In total, there are 165 mountains over 3,000 m above sea level, with a total of 275 peaks.
- Of these 165 mountains, 116 (70%) are located in the Central Mountain Range, 41 (25%) in the Xueshan Range and 8 (5%) in the Yushan Range.
- Both the Alishan Range and the Hai'an Range (With Data Mountain and Xingang Mountain as the highest mountains respectively) don't feature peaks exceeding 3,000 m above sea level, therefore they are not listed.

=== Over 2,900 m ===
Rank	Name	Height	Location	Range
166	Xiaoxue Mountain 小雪山	2,997 m (9,833 ft)	Taian, Miaoli	Xueshan
166	Shangzhi Mountain 雙子山 – Triangulation Point Peak 基點峰	2,997 m (9,833 ft)	Xinyi, Nantou	Central
167	Saike Mountain 塞珂山	2,989 m (9,806 ft)	Zhuoxi, Hualien	Central
168	Chayan Mountain 茶岩山	2,987 m (9,800 ft)	Heping, Taichung	Central
168	Jiuxian Mountain 九仙山	2,987 m (9,800 ft)	Heping, Taichung	Xueshan
168	Wufanaiwei Mountain 武法奈尾山	2,987 m (9,800 ft)	Ren'ai, Nantou	Central
171	Lu Mountain 鹿山	2,981 m (9,780 ft)	Tauyuan, Kaohsiung	Yushan
172	Heiyan Mountain 黑岩山	2,980 m (9,777 ft)	Xiulin, Hualien	Central
172	Mudan Mountain (Mudanyan Mountain) 牡丹山 (牡丹岩山)	2,980 m (9,777 ft)	Xiulin, Hualien	Central
172	Nanmayang Mountain 南馬洋山	2,980 m (9,777 ft)	Jianshi, Hsinchu	Hsuehshan
172	Xiaoshigong Mountain 小石公山	2,980 m (9,777 ft)	Wanrong, Hualien	Central
173	Yibahou Mountain 伊巴厚山	2,979 m (9,774 ft)	Xinyi, Nantou	Central
174	Zhiliangjie Mountain 志良節山	2,976 m (9,764 ft)	Heping, Taichung	Hsuehshan
174	Moyemingbing Mountain 魔葉名病山	2,976 m (9,764 ft)	Nan'ao, Yilan	Central
175	Guanmen Mountain 關門山 – Main Peak 主峰, Western Peak 西峰	2,975 m (9,760 ft), 2,912 m (9,554 ft)	Xinyi, Nantou	Central
176	Wule Mountain 舞樂山 – Main Peak 主峰, Triangulation Point Peak 基點峰	2,972 m (9,751 ft), 2,955 m (9,695 ft)	Zhuoxi, Hualien	Central
177	Baiguchi Mountain 白姑池山	2,957 m (9,701 ft)	Heping, Taichung	Xueshan
178	Wumeilangbang Mountain 烏妹浪胖山 – Southern Peak 南峰	2,950 m (9,678 ft)	Zhuoxi, Hualien	Central
179	Kashe Mountain 卡社大山	2,947 m (9,669 ft)	Wanrong, Hualien	Central
180	Jilong Mountain 基隆山	2,938 m (9,639 ft)	Heping, Taichung	Xueshan
181	Luntaiwun Mountain 倫太文山	2,937 m (9,636 ft)	Wanrong, Hualien	Central
182	Duiguan Mountain (Guangao Mountain) 對關山 (觀高山)	2,936 m (9,633 ft)	Xinyi, Nantou	Yushan
183	Meinaitian Mountain 美奈田主山	2,930 m (9,613 ft)	Yanping, Taitung	Central
184	Jinzi Mountain (Jyunkeng Mountain) 金子山 (郡坑山) – Eastern Peak 東峰	2,928 m (9,606 ft)	Xinyi, Nantou	Yushan
185	Keke'erbo Mountain 可可爾博山	2,926 m (9,600 ft)	Zhuoxi, Hualien	Central
186	Apolan Mountain 阿波蘭山	2,922 m (9,587 ft)	Zhuoxi, Hualien	Central
187	Xibadulan Mountain 西巴都蘭山	2,920 m (9,580 ft)	Xiulin, Hualien	Central
188	Sanchi Mountain 三池山	2,919 m (9,577 ft)	Xiulin, Hualien	Central
189	Luli Mountain 呂禮山 – Northern Peak 北峰	2,914 m (9,560 ft)	Haiduan, Taitung	Central
190	Zhimao Mountain 治茆山	2,913 m (9,557 ft)	Xinyi, Nantou	Yushan
191	Jingjie Mountain 境界山	2,910 m (9,547 ft)	Jianshi, Hsinchu	Hsuehshan
192	Wangtai Mountain 望台山	2,907 m (9,537 ft)	Xiulin, Hualien	Central
193	Shiwan Mountain 拾丸山	2,905 m (9,531 ft)	Tai'an, Miaoli	Xueshan
194	Andongkun Mountain 安東昆山	2,903 m (9,524 ft)	Tauyuan, Kaohsiung	Central
194	Jiabeili Mountain 加卑里山	2,903 m (9,524 ft)	Xiulin, Hualien	Central
195	Beikeke'erbo Mountain 北可可爾博山	2,902 m (9,521 ft)	Zhuoxi, Hualien	Central

Note:

- The " – " means the mountain was already listed in the last list above.

== Other mountains ==
- Data Mountain 大塔山: 2,663 m (8,737 ft), the highest mountain of Alishan Range, in Alishan, Chiayi.
- Taiping Mountain 太平山: 1,950 m (6,398 ft), a famous mountain in Datong, Yilan.
- Xingang Mountain 新港山: 1,682 m (5,518 ft), the highest mountain of Hai'an Range, in Fuli, Hualien.
- Qianliyan Mountain 千里眼山

=== Volcanoes ===
==== Over 1,000 m ====
Rank	Name	Height	Location	Volcano Group
1	Qixing Mountain (Seven Star Mountain, Qixing Shan / Mountain, Mount Cising or Qixing) – Main Peak 主峰, Eastern Peak 東峰	1,120 m (3,675 ft), 1,107 m (3,632 ft)	Beitou, Taipei	Datun
2	Zhuzi Mountain 竹子山 (Mount Chikushi, Teck-ah-soan)	1,094 m (3,589 ft)	Sanzhi District, New Taipei City	Datun
3	Datun Mountain 大屯山 (North hill, Twa-tun, Daitonzan)	1,092 m (3,583 ft)	Beitou, Taipei	Datun
4	Xiaoguanyin Mountain 小觀音山 – Main Peak 主峰, Western Peak 西峰	1,066 m (3,497 ft), 1,056 m (3,465 ft)	Beitou, Taipei	Datun

== Mountain areas ==
- Alishan National Scenic Area: a famous mountain area in Alishan, Chiayi and nearby townships.
- Yangmingshan National Park: a famous mountain and volcano area in Beitou and Shilin, Taipei City and nearby districts of New Taipei City.

=== Volcano areas (groups) ===
- Datun Volcano Area (Tatun Volcano Area): a volcano area in Yangmingshan National Park, Beitou and Shilin, Taipei City and nearby districts of New Taipei City.
- Keelung Volcano Area (Chilung or Jilong Volcano Area): a volcano area in Ruifang and Shuangxi, New Taipei City, near Keelung City.
- Penghu Volcano Area 澎湖火山區: a volcano area in Penghu.

== See also ==
- List of volcanoes in Taiwan
- List of islands by highest point
- Geography of Taiwan
- World record
- List of Taiwanese superlatives
- Taiwan
