= $100 =

There are many $100 banknotes, bills or coins, including:

- Australian one-hundred-dollar note
- Canadian one-hundred-dollar note
- New Zealand one hundred-dollar note
- Nicaraguan one-hundred-cordoba note
- United States one-hundred-dollar bill
- One of the banknotes of the Hong Kong dollar
- One of the Fifth series of the New Taiwan Dollar banknote
- One of the banknotes of Zimbabwe

Other currencies that issue $100 banknotes, bills or coins are:

- Barbadian dollar
- Belize dollar
- Bermudian dollar
- Brunei dollar
- Cayman Islands dollar
- Eastern Caribbean dollar
- Fijian dollar
- Guyanese dollar
- Jamaican dollar
- Liberian dollar
- Namibian dollar
- Samoan tālā
- Singapore dollar
- Solomon Islands dollar
- Surinamese dollar
- Trinidad and Tobago dollar
- Cape Verdean escudo
- Tongan paʻanga
- Argentine peso
- Chilean peso
- Colombian peso
- Cuban peso
- Dominican peso
- Mexican peso
- Uruguayan peso
- Brazilian real

== Other uses ==
- One Hundred Dollars, a Canadian alternative folk country band
