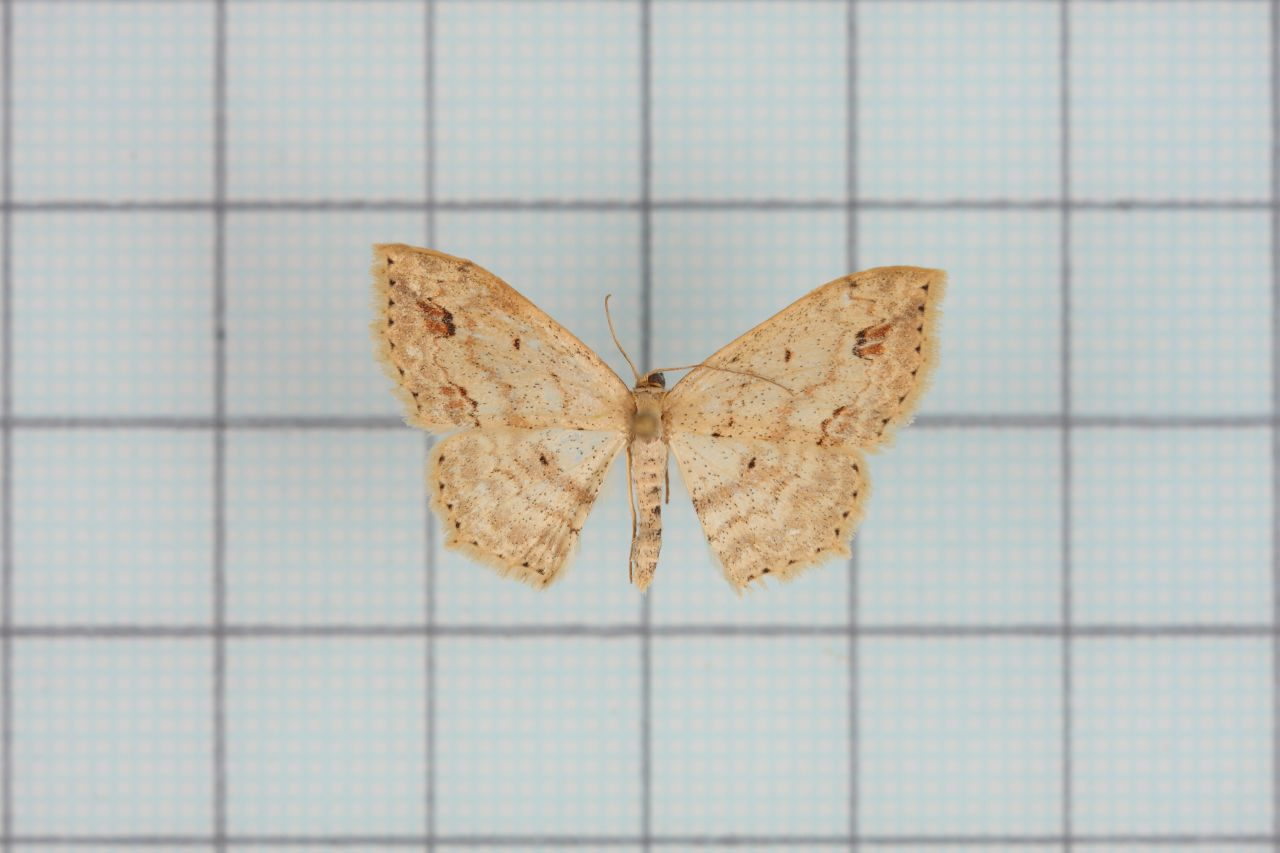

Scientific classification
- Kingdom: Animalia
- Phylum: Arthropoda
- Class: Insecta
- Order: Lepidoptera
- Family: Geometridae
- Genus: Scopula
- Species: S. anatreces

Binomial name
- Scopula anatreces Prout, 1920

= Scopula anatreces =

Species of geometer moth in subfamily Sterrhinae

Scopula anatreces is a species of moth of the family Geometridae. It was described by Louis B. Prout in 1920 based on material from Alishan, Taiwan. It is endemic to Taiwan.

The wingspan is 35 mm (1.4 in).
