= Yunfeng =

Yunfeng may refer to:

- Cloud Peak (Taiwan), or Yunfeng, mountain in Taiwan
- Yunfeng Capital, Chinese private equity firm
- Yunfeng Dam, concrete gravity dam on the Yalu River which borders China and North Korea
