= Mount Dabajian =

Mountain in Hsinchu County, Taiwan

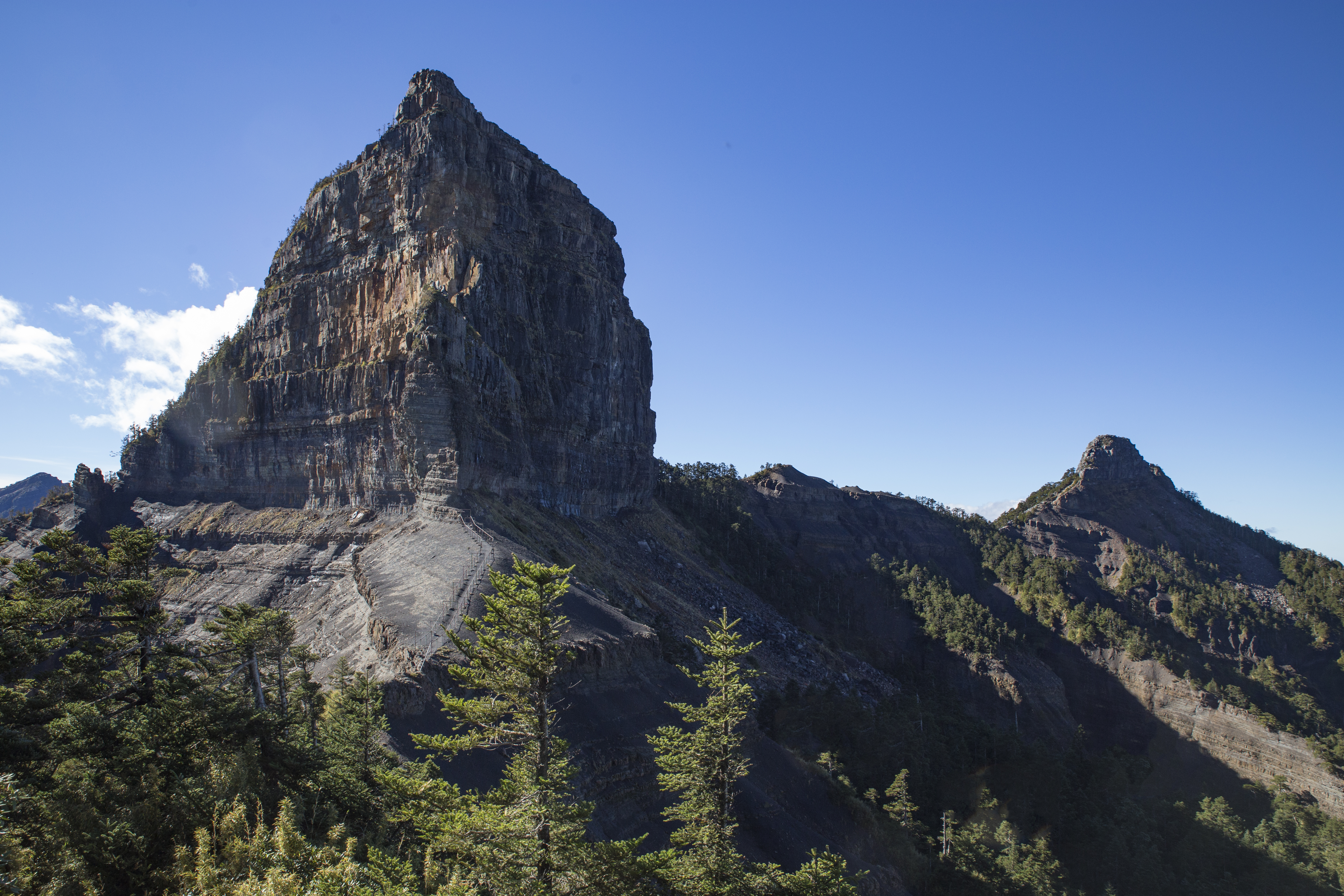

Highest point
- Elevation: 3,492 m (11,457 ft)
- Listing: List of mountains in Taiwan
- Coordinates: 24°27′58″N 121°15′29″E

Geography
- Location: Hsinchu County, Taiwan
- Parent range: Xueshan Range

Climbing
- First ascent: 1927

Mount Dabajian (Chinese: 大霸尖山; pinyin: Dàbàjiān Shān; Pe̍h-ōe-jī: Tāi-pà-chiam san calque of Atayal: Papak Waqa "towering ear", Saisiyat: Kapatalayan) is located in the northern section of the Shei-Pa National Park in Hsinchu County, Taiwan. It is surrounded by numerous other peaks, the most predominant including Mount Nanhu, Mount Yize, Central Range Point, Mt. Pintian, and Mt. Mutule. It is also near the Madala River.

== History ==
The first ascent of the mountain was made in 1927.

Ladders were installed to make summiting the challenging peak easier, but these were removed in 1991, and summiting the peak is now forbidden.

== Geology ==
The mountain stands at a height of 3,492 m (11,457 ft).

== Terrain ==
The bottom half of Dabajian Mountain is a medium grade hill with about a 35° incline. The top half is an almost vertical rock face. The mountain's steep grade and unique features were mainly formed by wind erosion. The mountain is composed mainly of greywacke.

== See also ==
- List of mountains in Taiwan
