= Dongxiaonan Mountain =

Mountain in Kaohsiung, Taiwan

Mount Dongxiaonan
- East Xiaonan Mountain
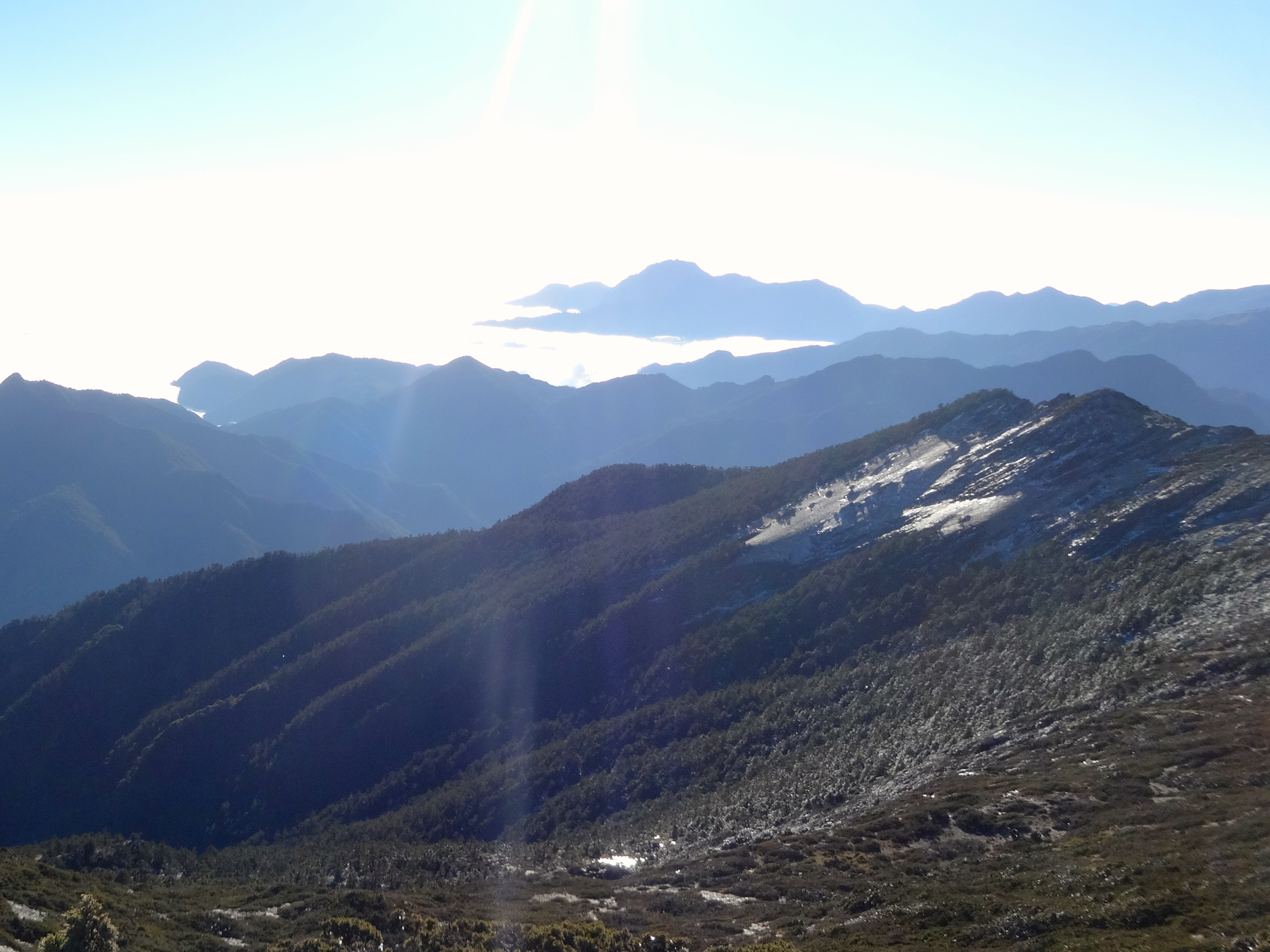
- Mount Dongxiaonan in 2014

Highest point
- Elevation: 3,744 m (12,283 ft)
- Coordinates: 23.439°N 120.9634°E

Naming
- Native name: 東小南山 (Chinese)

Geography
- Location within Kaohsiung
- Parent range: Yushan Range

Mount Dongxiaonan (Chinese: 東小南山; lit. 'east little south mountain') is a mountain in Tauyuan District, Kaohsiung, Taiwan with an elevation of 3,744 m (12,283 ft).

Owing to its flat, gently sloping peak, Dongxiaonan is known as the first of the 'Flat Nine' peaks in the 100 Peaks of Taiwan.

== See also ==
- List of mountains in Taiwan
- 100 Peaks of Taiwan
