= $200 =

There are a small number of $200 banknotes:

- One of the Nicaraguan córdoba banknotes
- One of the Philippine peso banknotes
- One of the fifth series of the New Taiwan Dollar banknote
- One of the banknotes of the Namibian dollar; see Namibian dollar § Banknotes
- One of the banknotes of the Surinamese dollar; see Surinamese dollar § Banknotes

== See also ==
- Fake denominations of United States currency
