= Qianliyan (disambiguation) =

Qianliyan is a Chinese sea and door god.

Qianliyan may also refer to:

- Qianliyan Island, an island off Qingdao, Shandong, China
- Mount Qianliyan, a mountain on Taiwan Island
