= $2,000 =

Currencies that issue banknotes in 2,000 denominations include:

- Fifth series of the New Taiwan Dollar banknote
- Cape Verdean escudo
- Chilean peso
- Colombian peso
- Dominican peso
- Uruguayan peso
