= Cloud Peak (disambiguation) =

Cloud Peak may refer to one of the following:

- One of four mountain peaks in the United States:
  - Cloud Peak (Kodiak Island, Alaska)
  - Cloud Peak (North Slope, Alaska) - highest summit of the Philip Smith Mountains
  - Cloud Peak (Michigan)
  - Cloud Peak (Wyoming) - highest summit of the Big Horn Mountains and the 4th highest summit of the State of Wyoming
- Cloud Peak (Taiwan), a mountain
