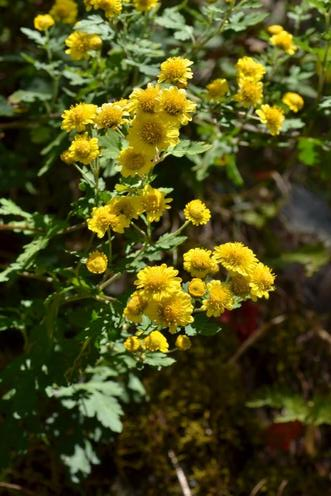

Scientific classification
- Kingdom: Plantae
- Clade: Tracheophytes
- Clade: Angiosperms
- Clade: Eudicots
- Clade: Asterids
- Order: Asterales
- Family: Asteraceae
- Genus: Chrysanthemum
- Species: C. arisanense

Binomial name
- Chrysanthemum arisanense (Hayata) Ling

= Chrysanthemum arisanense =

Species of plant

Chrysanthemum arisanense is a flowering pant within the Asteraceae family. It is also known as Dendranthema arisanense. Both species names and its two Chinese common names (Chinese: 阿里山油菊 and 阿里山菊) refer to the Alishan Range C. arisanense is endemic to Taiwan and is found at elevations between 1,600 and 3,200 meters.
