= Central Range Point =

Mountain in Hualien and Taichung, Taiwan

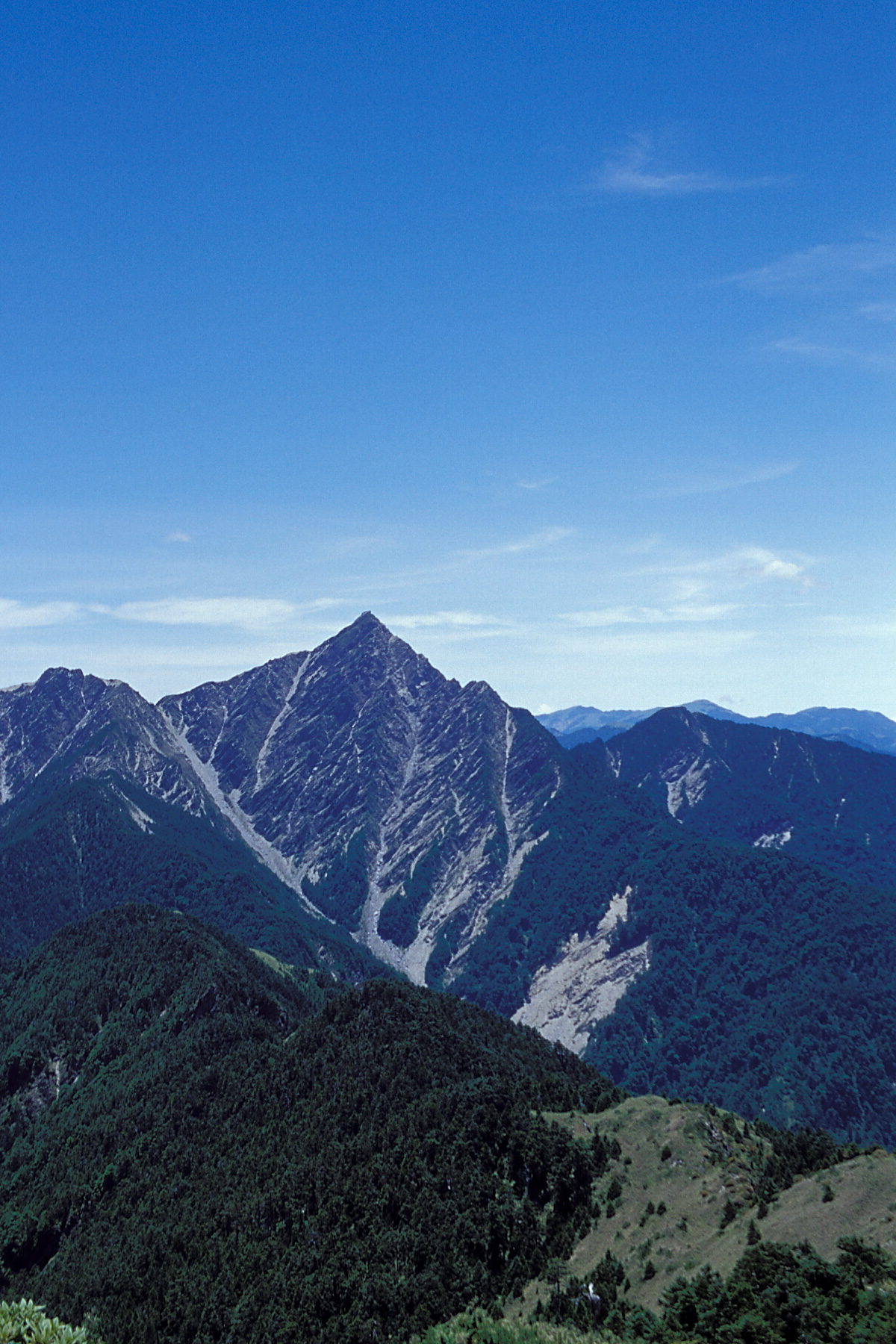

Highest point
- Elevation: 3,703 m (12,149 ft)
- Coordinates: 24.30°N 121.41°E

Naming
- Native name: 中央尖山 (Chinese)

Geography
- Location within Taiwan
- Location: Taiwan

Central Range Point (Chinese: 中央尖山; pinyin: Zhōngyāng Jiānshān) is a mountain in Taiwan with an elevation of 3,703 m (12,149 ft). It looks like a triangular pyramid from the north and south sides, being the south side very steep and difficult to climb. The normal climbing route comes from Nanhu Mountain. Its west side path, the normal route continuing south, is also known as the "Death Crest" due to its danger.

== See also ==
- List of mountains in Taiwan
