= Mount Xinkang =

Mountain in Hualien County, Taiwan

Coordinates: 23.3164°N 121.1275°E

Mount Xinkang (Chinese: 新康山; Hanyu Pinyin: Xīnkāng Shān; Tongyong Pinyin: Sinkang Shan) is a mountain in Taiwan with an elevation of 3,331 m (10,928 ft).

== See also ==
- List of mountains in Taiwan
