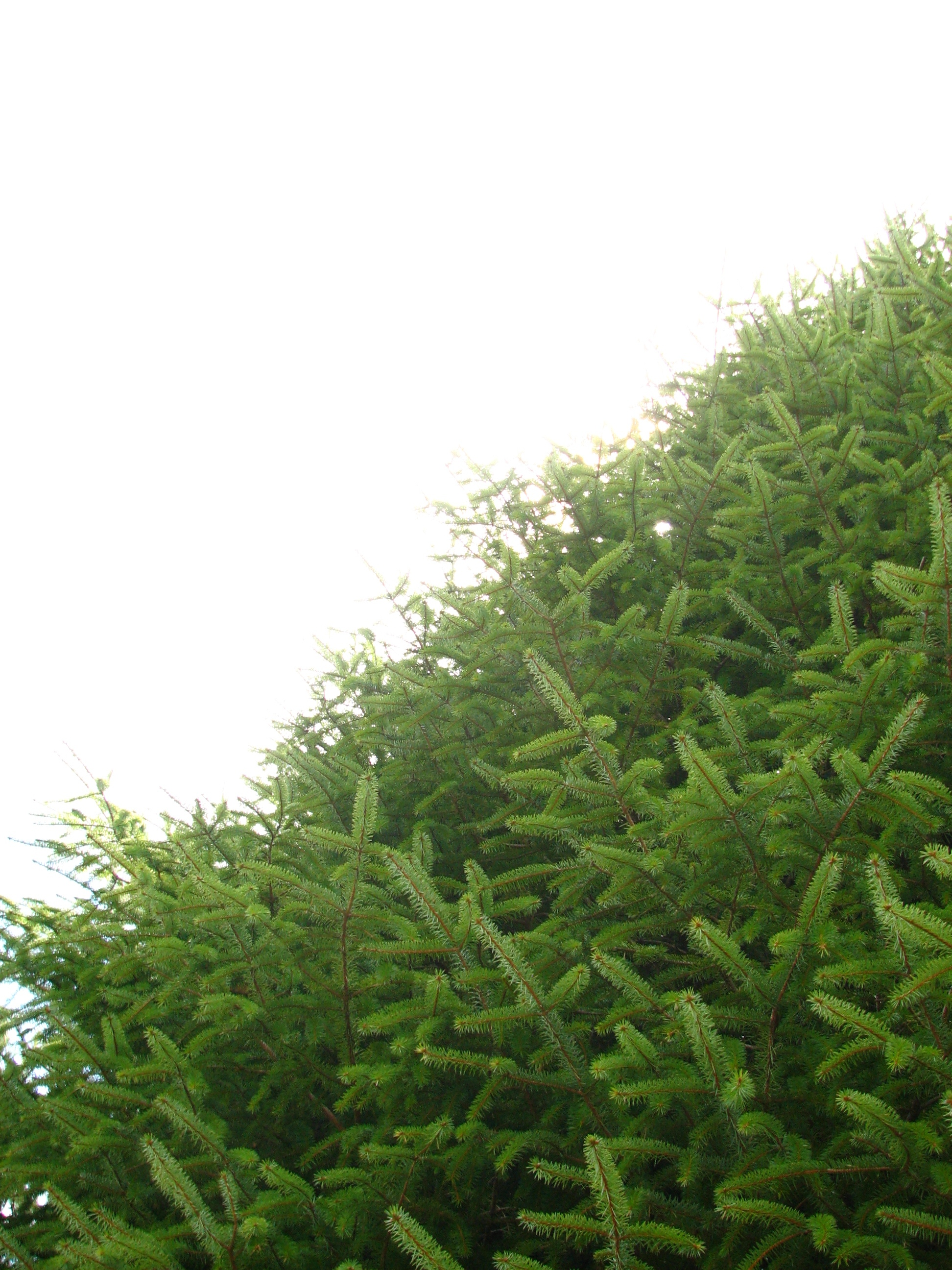

Conservation status
- Vulnerable (IUCN 3.1)

Scientific classification
- Kingdom: Plantae
- Clade: Tracheophytes
- Clade: Gymnospermae
- Division: Pinophyta
- Class: Pinopsida
- Order: Pinales
- Family: Pinaceae
- Genus: Picea
- Species: P. morrisonicola

Binomial name
- Picea morrisonicola Hayata

= Picea morrisonicola =

Species of conifer

Picea morrisonicola, the Taiwan spruce, is a species of conifer in the family Pinaceae. It is found only in Taiwan, and it is the only species of spruce in Taiwan. It is the southernmost species of spruce in the world, being spread near the Tropic of Cancer, and, subsequently, is only thought to be hardy to USDA Zone 8. Taiwan spruce is a large tree, up to 50 m (160 ft) in height and 1.5 m (4 ft 11 in) in diameter. It grows at altitudes of about 2,000–2,500 m (6,600–8,200 ft) in the Central Mountain Range in ravines and mountain slopes, usually mixed with other trees.

Taiwan spruce is one of the most important timber species in Taiwan. Populations have declined because of overexploitation.
