= Mount Guan =

Mountain in Kaohsiung and Taitung, Taiwan

Coordinates: 23.2283°N 120.9117°E

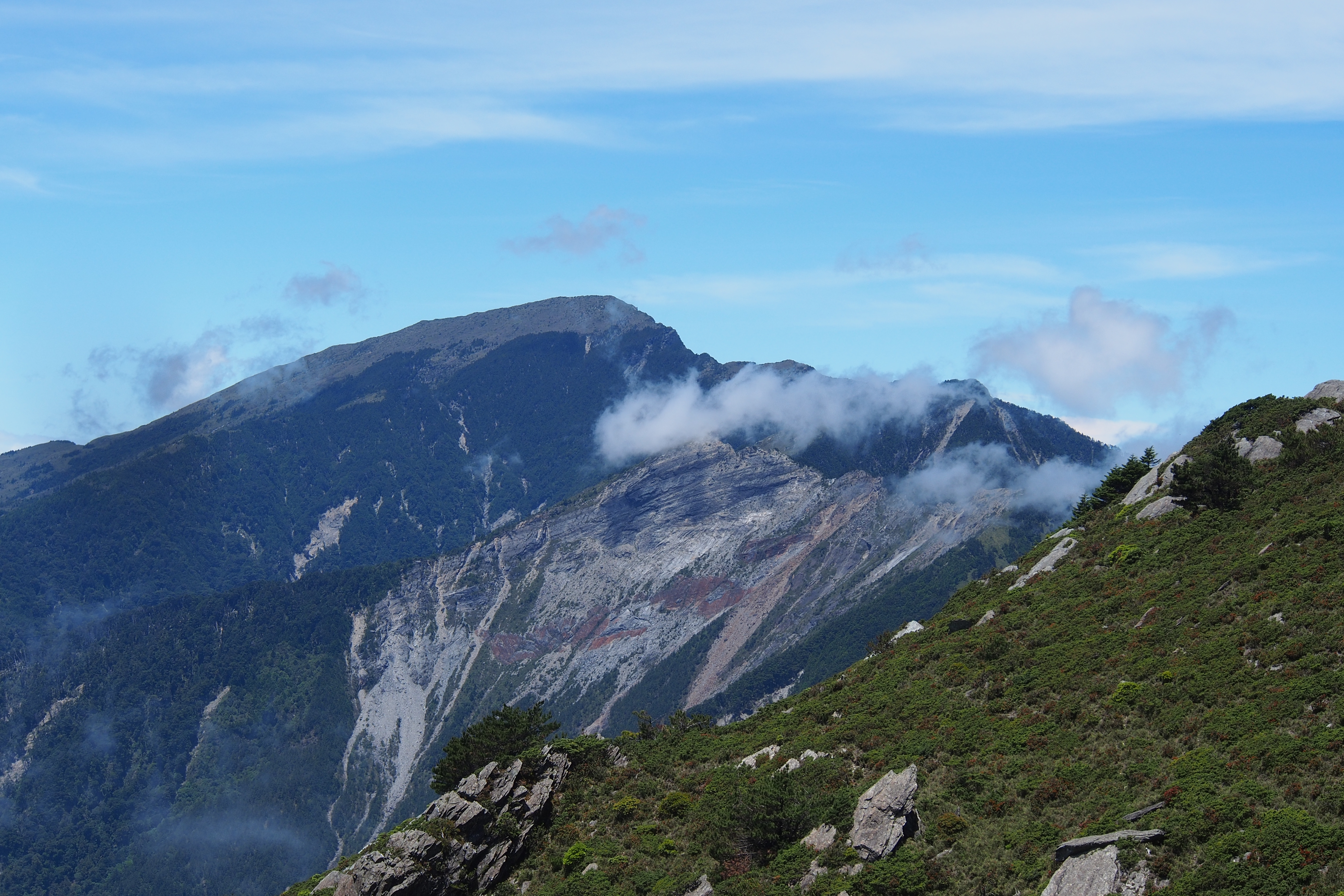

Highest point
- Elevation: 3,666 m (12,028 ft)
- Prominence: 1,005 m (3,297 ft)
- Listing: 100 Peaks of Taiwan, Ribu

Geography
- Location within Taiwan
- Location: Taitung County/Kaohsiung City, Taiwan
- Parent range: Central Mountain Range

Mount Guan (Chinese: 關山; pinyin: Guān Shān) is a mountain in the Central Mountain Range of Taiwan with an elevation of 3,666 m (12,028 ft).

== See also ==
- List of mountains in Taiwan
