= Mount Qianliyan =

Mountain in Taiwan

Mt Qianliyan 千里眼山
- Mountain
- Coordinates: 24°12′21″N 121°38′51″E
- Location: Taroko National Park, Hualien County, Taiwan
- Part of: Central Range
- Geology: Mountain
- Elevation: 1,623 m (5,325 ft)

Mount Qianliyan
- Chinese: 千里眼山
- Literal meaning: Qianliyan Mountain
Transcriptions
Standard Mandarin
- Hanyu Pinyin: Qiānlǐyǎnshān; Qiānlǐyǎn Shān
- Wade–Giles: Ch'ien-li-yen-shan; Ch'ien-li-yen Shan

Mount Qianliyan, also known by its Chinese name as Qianliyan Shan, is a mountain on Taiwan Island. It is located in Hualien County and is part of Taiwan's Central Range.

== Etymology ==
Qianliyan is the atonal pinyin romanization of the Mandarin pronunciation of the mountain's Chinese name 千里眼. It is named for Qianliyan, the "thousand-mile eyed" door god in Chinese mythology.

== Geography ==
Mount Qianliyan has a maximum elevation of 1,623 meters (5,325 ft) above sea level, with a local prominence of 70 meters (230 ft). A trail leads to the peak from the nearest village, Sakadan.
