= Xiangyang Mountain =

Mountain in Kaohsiung and Taitung, Taiwan

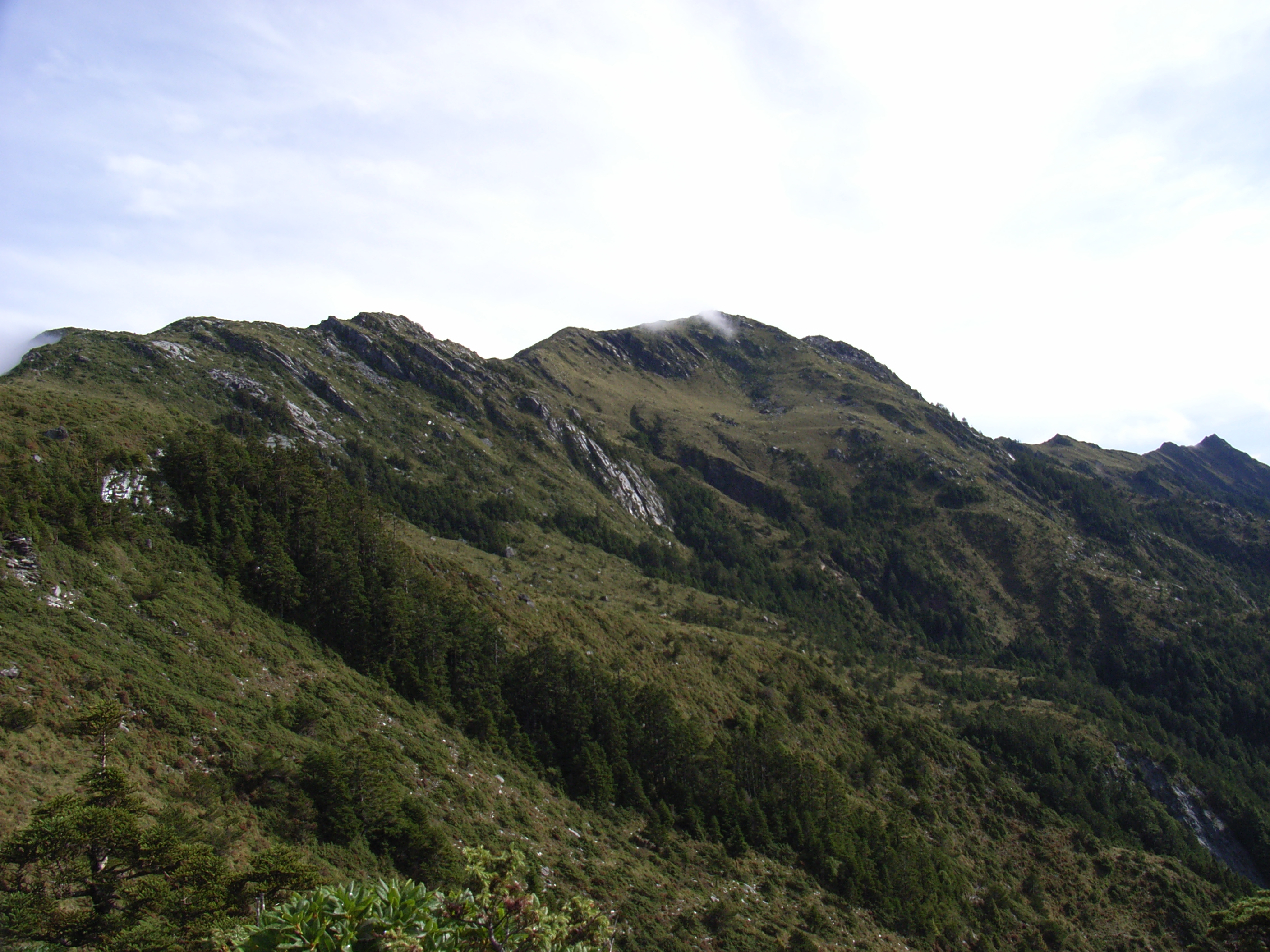

Highest point
- Elevation: 3,603 m (11,821 ft)
- Coordinates: 23°17′03″N 120°59′33″E

Naming
- Native name: 向陽山 (Chinese)

Geography
- Location within Taiwan
- Location: Taoyuan, Kaohsiung, Taiwan

Geology
- Mountain type: Mountain

Xiangyang Mountain (Chinese: 向陽山; Hanyu Pinyin: Xiàngyáng Shān; Tongyong Pinyin: Siàngyáng Shan) is a mountain in Kaohsiung, Taiwan with an elevation of 3,603 m (11,821 ft).

== See also ==
- List of mountains in Taiwan
