= Fifth series of the new Taiwan dollar banknote =

Banknotes introduced in 2000

The fifth series of the new Taiwan dollar banknotes is the current and latest series to be issued for circulation in the Republic of China (Taiwan). It was first introduced by the Central Bank of the Republic of China (Taiwan) on 3 July 2000.

== Background ==
For years the old Chinese Nationalist yuan was still the official national currency of the Republic of China. The Chinese Nationalist yuan was also known as the fiat currency (法幣) or the silver yuán (銀元), even though it was decoupled from the value of silver during World War II. Many older statutes in ROC law have fines and fees denominated in this currency.

Along with the introduction of this series of banknotes, the New Taiwan dollar became the official currency of the ROC and is no longer secondary to the silver yuan. For the first time, the Central Bank of the Republic of China began the issuing authority of the banknotes directly, rather than the Bank of Taiwan. This series also ends a four-decade tradition of including Chiang Kai-shek in most of the banknotes of higher denominations except for the NT$200 issue, opting for the more "modern" themes.

Two new denominations were issued in this series, the NT$200 and NT$2,000. The NT$100 and NT$200 banknotes features national figures and buildings, while the other denominations present more general national themes and natural habitats in Taiwan. The groups of people depicted on themes of the NT$500 and NT$1,000 banknotes are real personalities taken by photographers.

== Security features ==
Several new security features have been incorporated into this series. Microprinting, windowed security threads, perfect registration devices and lithographic printing have been included. The NT$2,000 was initially the only banknote to feature a holographic patch, being the highest denomination banknote in public circulation. This feature has since been extended to NT$500 and NT$1,000 banknotes, which now include a holographic strip.

== Banknotes in general circulation ==
=== NT$100 banknote ===
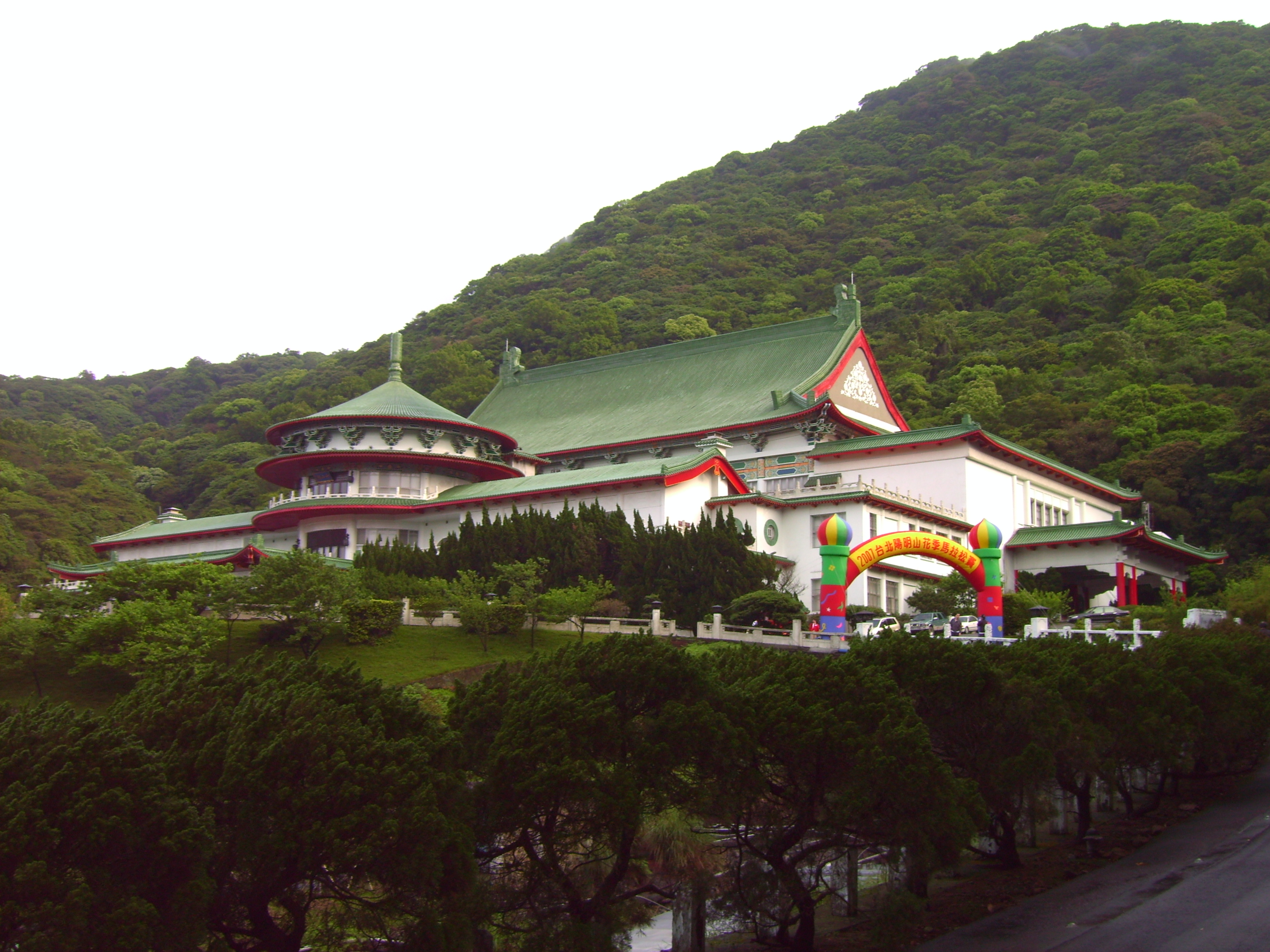
The Chung-Shan Building is shown in the NT$100 banknote.

The obverse of the banknote features the first president of the ROC, Dr. Sun Yat-sen, with the verses of "The Chapter of Great Harmony" by Confucius in the background. The reverse shows the Chung-Shan Building. It was first issued on 2 July 2001 for general circulation.

=== NT$200 banknote ===
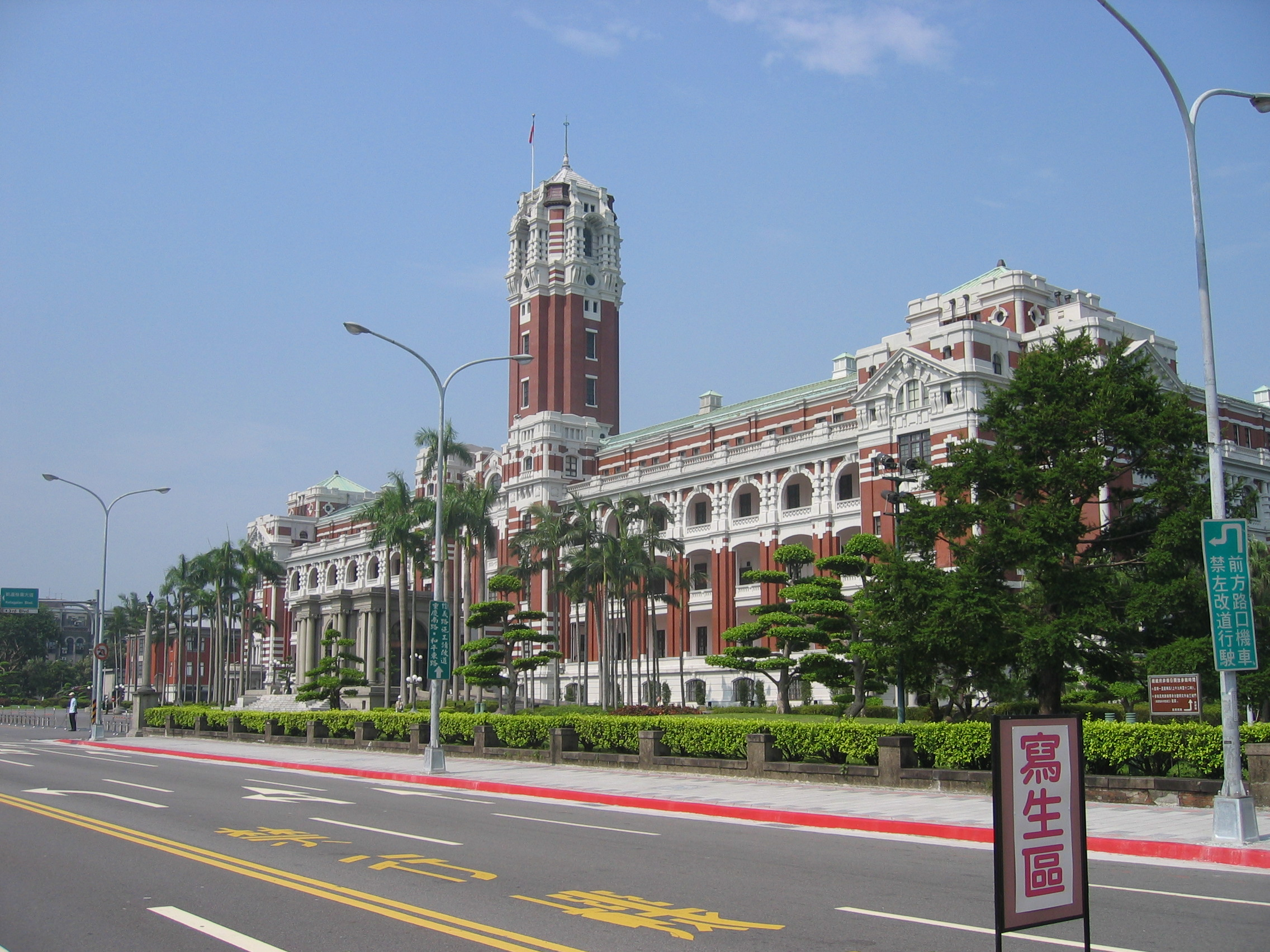
The Presidential Office Building in Taipei is shown in the NT$200 banknote.

The obverse of the banknote features the Generalissimo and Chairman of the Nationalist Government of the ROC Chiang Kai-shek, with his Land Reform Policy and Public Education in the background. The reverse shows the Presidential Office Building in Taipei.

The NT$200 banknote was first issued on 2 January 2002 for general circulation.

=== NT$500 banknote ===
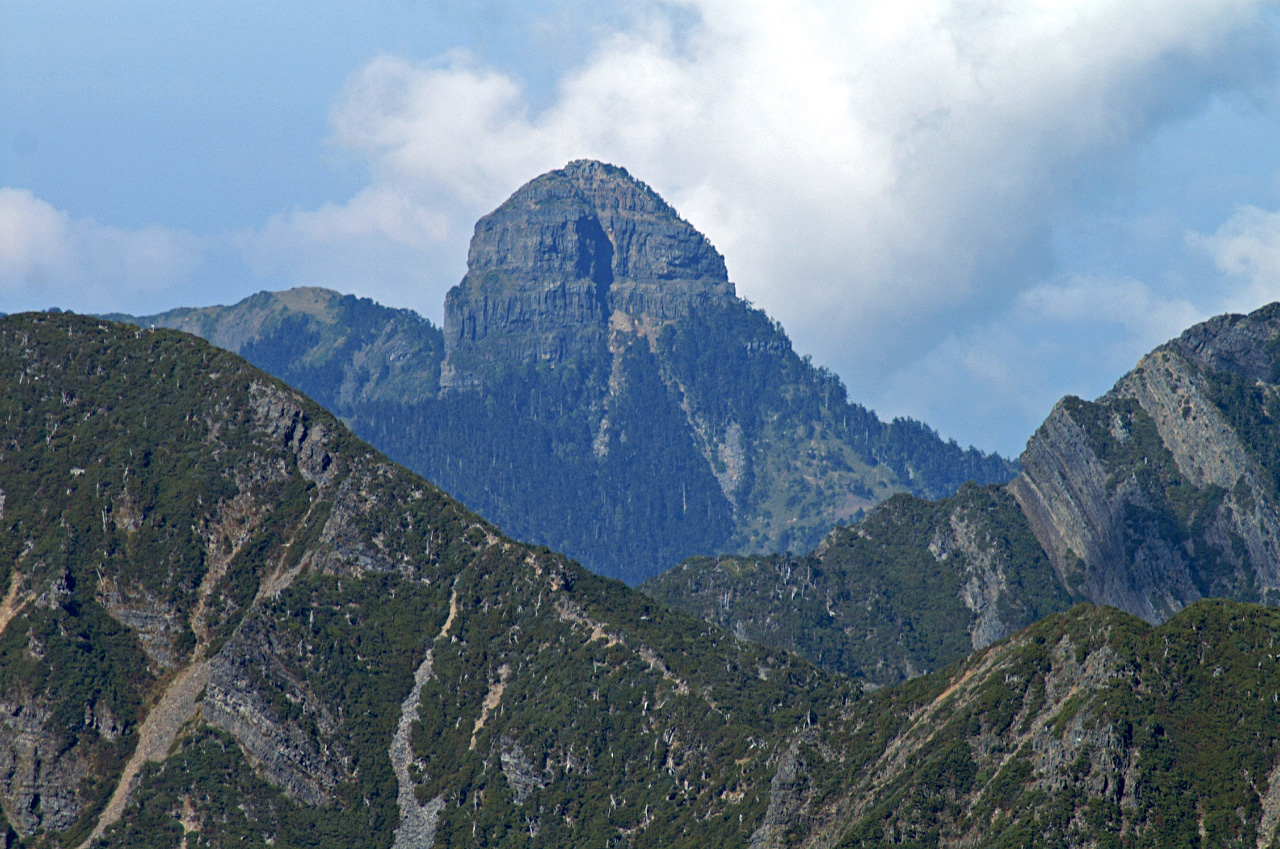
Dabajian Mountain is depicted on the NT$500 banknote.

The obverse of the banknote features youth baseballers, known for their achievements as 17 times champion in the Little League World Series. The reverse of the banknote features the sika deer and Dabajian Mountain.

First introduced on 15 December 2000 for general circulation, the Central Bank of China relaunched the banknote with a holographic stripe and a darker color due to counterfeiting concerns and possible confusion with the NT$100 banknote. NT$500 banknotes without the holographic stripe have been recalled and withdrawn from use on 1 August 2007. As of 1 October 2007, only the Bank of Taiwan (now the Central Bank of the Republic of China) accepts such notes.

=== NT$1,000 banknote ===
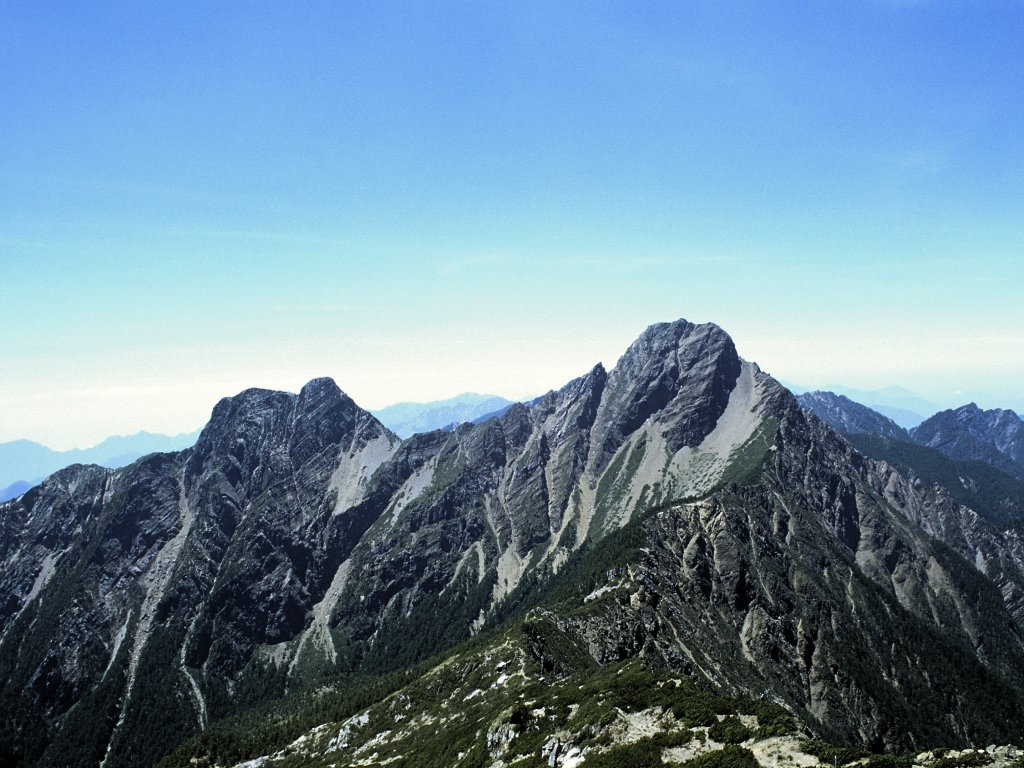
Jade Mountain is depicted on the NT$1,000 banknote.

The obverse of the banknote features four children studying around a globe, symbolizing education. It is nicknamed 小朋友, "little children" (literally young friends) by the general public. The reverse of the banknote features the Mikado pheasant and Jade Mountain.

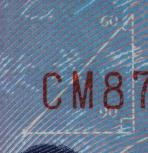
The erroneously labeled angle on the initial issue of the NT$1,000 banknote.

First introduced on 3 July 2000, the banknote was found to have contained several factual discrepancies that were subject to criticism. The globe that the children were surrounding appears to be a mirror image, possibly resulting from an invert error. The background shows a 45-degree angle labeled as 60 degrees.

Accordingly, the Central Bank of China relaunched the banknote with a holographic strip with the two errors rectified and the globe now rotated to the 140th meridian east on 20 July 2005. NT$1,000 banknotes without the holographic stripe have been recalled and withdrawn from use on 1 August 2007. As of 1 October 2007, only the Bank of Taiwan (now the Central Bank of the Republic of China) accepts such notes.

=== NT$2,000 banknote ===
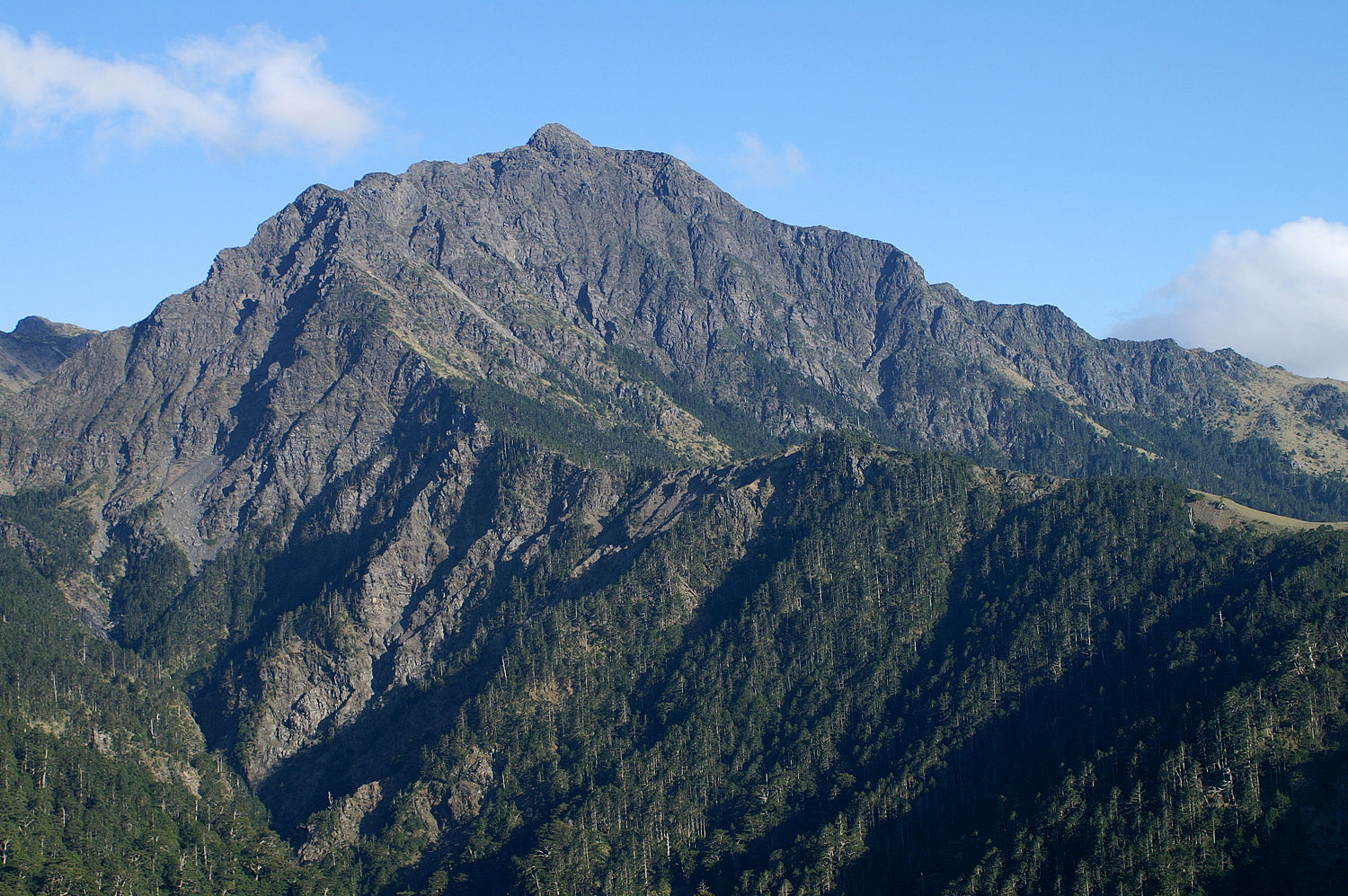
Nanhu Mountain is depicted on the NT$2,000 banknote.

The obverse of the banknote depicts technological advances with the FORMOSAT-1. The reverse of the banknote features the Formosan landlocked salmon and Nanhu Mountain.

First introduced on 1 July 2002, de facto this banknote does not appear common to the public possibly due to its new denomination and fears of losses through receiving a large-value counterfeit banknote.

== Specifications ==
1999 Series
Value	Dimensions	Main Colour	Description			Date of		
Value	Dimensions	Main Colour	Obverse	Reverse	Watermark	printing	issue	withdrawal
NT$100	145 × 70 mm	Red	Sun Yat-sen, "The Chapter of Great Harmony" by Confucius	Chung-Shan Building	Mei flower and "100"	Minguo 89 (2000)	2 July 2001	Current
NT$200	150 × 70 mm	Green	Chiang Kai-shek, land reform and public education	Presidential Office Building	Orchid and "200"	Minguo 90 (2001)	2 January 2002	Current
NT$500	155 × 70 mm	Brown	Youth baseball	Formosan sika deer, Mount Dabajian	Bamboo and "500"	Minguo 89 (2000)	15 December 2000	1 August 2007
NT$500	155 × 70 mm	Brown	Youth baseball, holographic strip	Formosan sika deer, Mount Dabajian	Bamboo and "500"	Minguo 93 (2004)	20 July 2005	Current
NT$1,000	160 × 70 mm	Blue	Elementary Education (with errors)	Mikado pheasant, Yushan (Jade Mountain)	Chrysanthemum and "1000"	Minguo 88 (1999)	3 July 2000	1 August 2007
NT$1,000	160 × 70 mm	Blue	Elementary Education (corrected), holographic strip	Mikado pheasant, Yushan (Jade Mountain)	Chrysanthemum and "1000"	Minguo 93 (2004)	20 July 2005	Current
NT$2,000	165 × 70 mm	Purple	Formosat-1, technology	Formosan landlocked salmon, Mount Nanhu	Pine and "2000"	Minguo 90 (2001)	1 July 2002	Current
