= Cloud Peak (Taiwan) =

Mountain in Taiwan

Cloud Peak Yunfeng
- Location within Taiwan

Highest point
- Elevation: 3,564 m (11,693 ft)
- Listing: 100 Peaks of Taiwan
- Coordinates: 23°21′13″N 120°58′32″E

Geography
- Location: Kaohsiung, Taiwan
- Parent range: Central Mountain Range

Cloud Peak or Yunfeng (Chinese: 雲峰; pinyin: yún fēng; lit. 'cloud peak') is a mountain in the Central Mountain Range of Taiwan with an elevation of 3,564 m (11,693 ft).

== See also ==
- List of mountains in Taiwan
