= Yushan Range =

Mountain range of Taiwan

Coordinates: 23.4698°N 120.9575°E

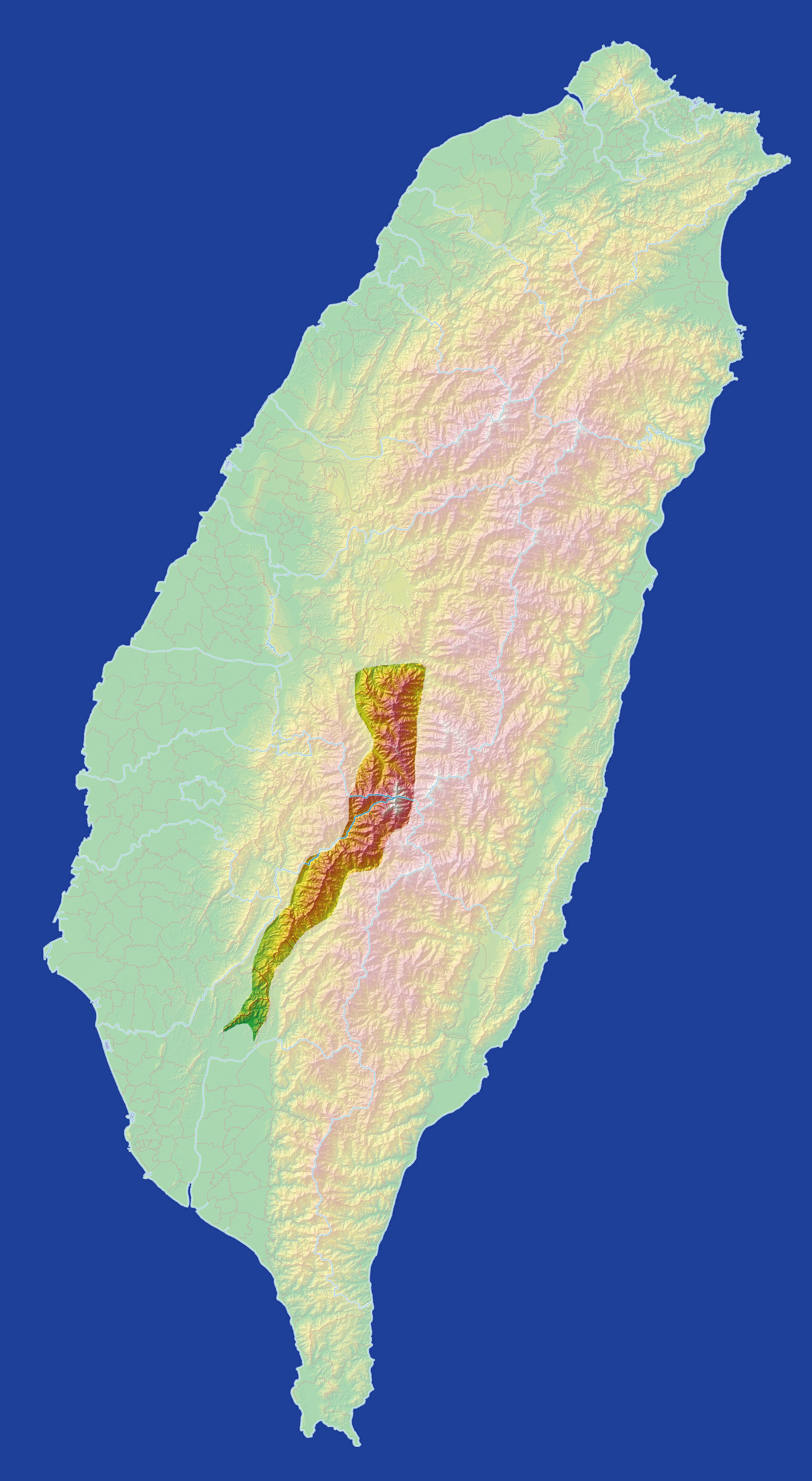
- Yushan Range
- Traditional Chinese: 玉山山脈
- Simplified Chinese: 玉山山脉
- Literal meaning: Jade Mountain Mountain Range
Transcriptions
Standard Mandarin
- Hanyu Pinyin: Yùshān Shānmài; Yùshān Shānmò
- Wade–Giles: Yü-shan Shan-mai; Yü-shan Shan-mo

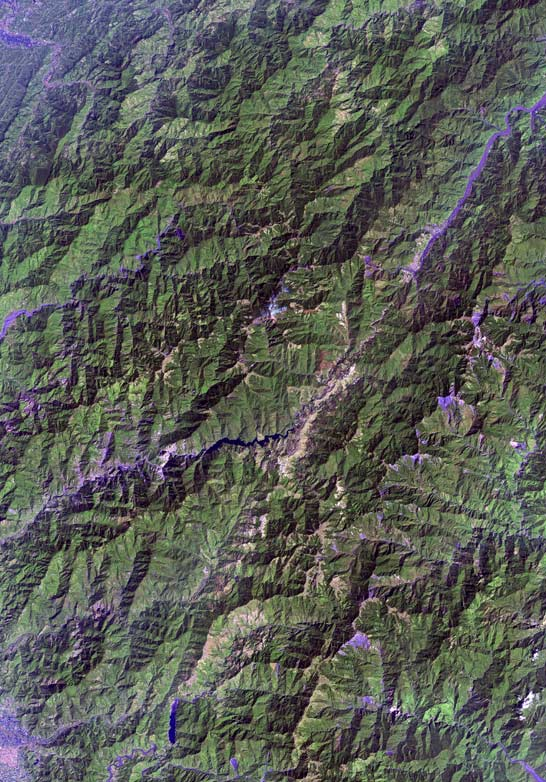
A satellite photo of the Yushan Range

The Yushan Range, formerly the Niitaka Range and also known as the Jade Mountain Range, is a mountain range in the central-southern region of Taiwan Island. It spans Chiayi County, Kaohsiung City, and Nantou County. It faces the Central Mountain Range on the east, and is separated by the Qishan River from the Alishan Range which is on the west of the Yushan Range. The Yushan Range is one of the five major ranges on Taiwan.

The Yushan Range is shaped somewhat like a crucifix, with a relatively short east to west ridge and a relatively long north to south ridge. Mighty Yushan, towering 3,952 m (12,966 ft) above sea level, stands at the point where these two ridges meet. Yushan National Park is located around some parts of the Yushan Range.

== List of peaks ==
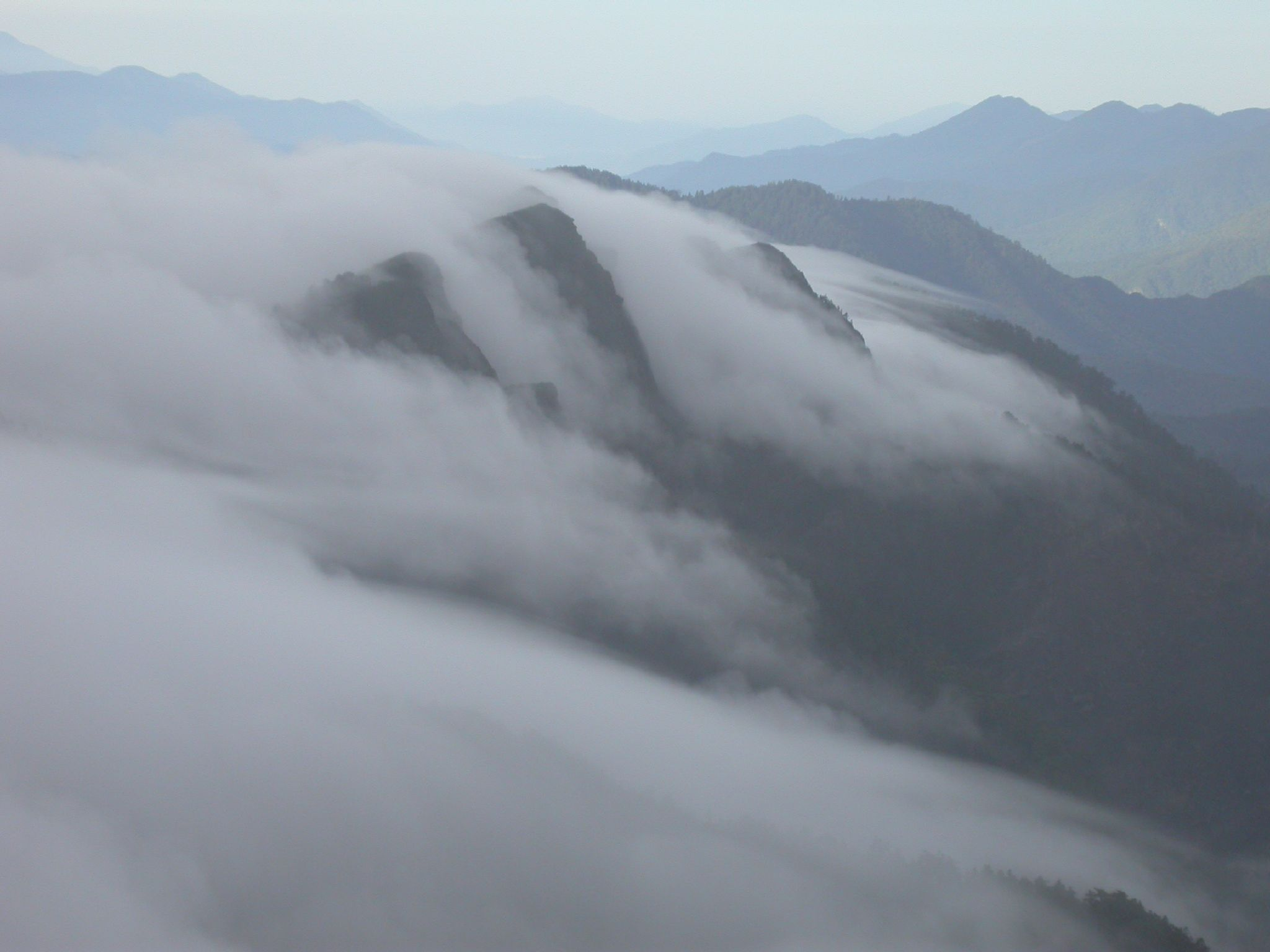
Sea of Clouds viewed from Yushan Trail

There are 22 peaks taller than 3,000 m (9,843 ft) among the Yushan Range, including 12 of the "top 100 peaks of Taiwan" (台灣百岳):

- Yushan Main Peak (玉山主峰), 3,952 m (12,966 ft)
- Yushan Eastern Peak (玉山東峰), 3,869 m (12,694 ft)
- Yushan Northern Peak (玉山北峰), 3,858 m (12,657 ft)
- Yushan Southern Peak (玉山南峰), 3,844 m (12,612 ft)
- Dongxiaonanshan (東小南山), 3,744 m (12,283 ft)
- Yushan Western Peak (玉山西峰), 3,467 m (11,375 ft)
- Nanyushan (南玉山), 3,383 m (11,099 ft)
- Badongguanshan (八通關山), 3,245 m (10,646 ft)
- Jundashan (郡大山), 3,265 m (10,712 ft)
- Yushan Forward Peak (玉山前峰), 3,239 m (10,627 ft)
- Xiluandashan (西巒大山), 3,081 m (10,108 ft)
- Lushan (鹿山), 2,981 m (9,780 ft)

== See also ==
- List of mountains in Taiwan
- List of islands by highest point
