= Mount Nanhu =

Mountain in Hualien and Taichung, Taiwan

- 南湖大山
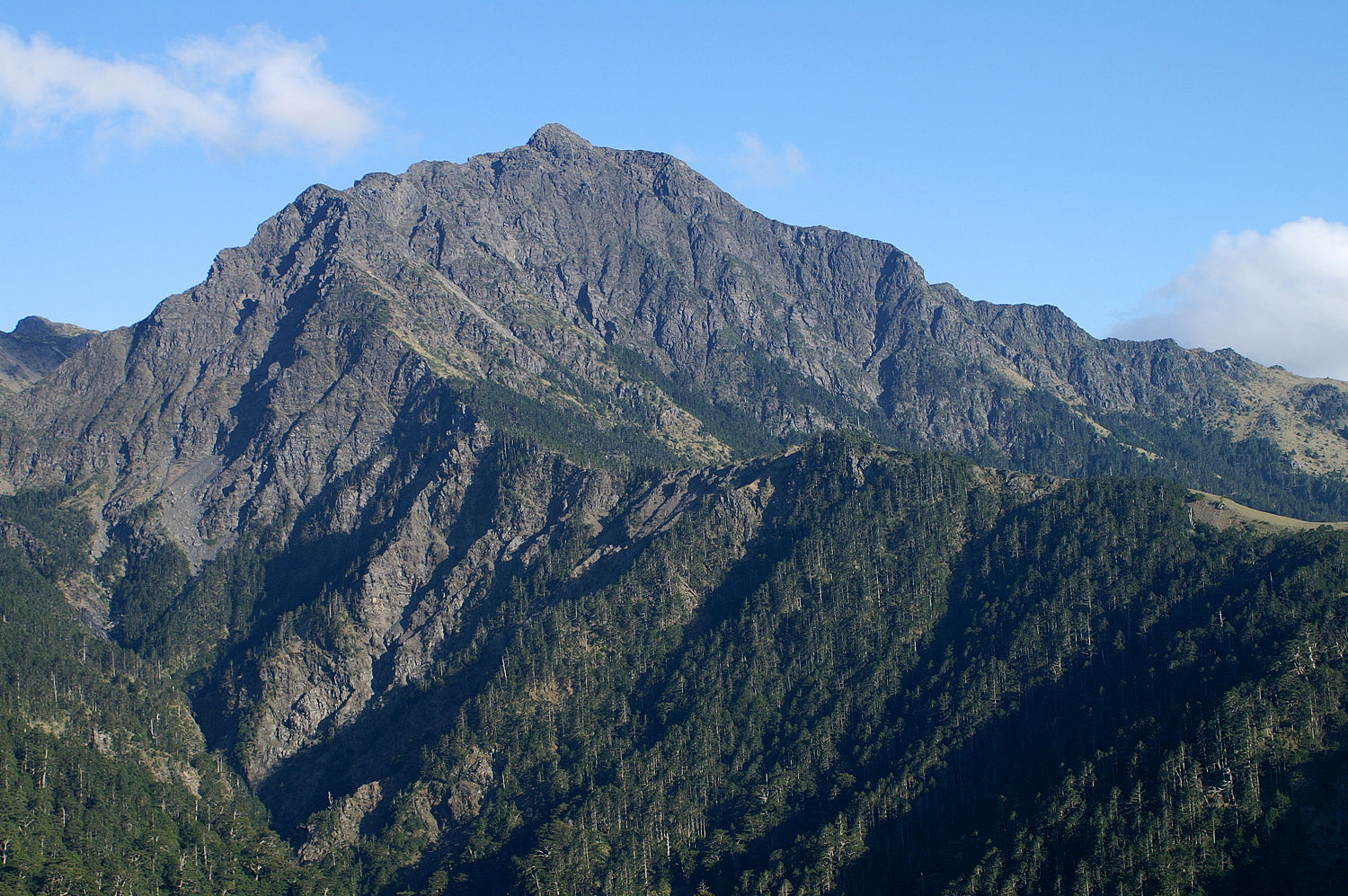

Highest point
- Elevation: 3,742 m (12,277 ft)
- Listing: 100 Peaks of Taiwan; Mountains in Taiwan
- Coordinates: 24°21′42″N 121°26′22″E

Geography
- Location within Taiwan
- Location: Heping District, Taichung, Taiwan
- Parent range: Central Mountain Range

Mount Nanhu (Chinese: 南湖大山) is a mountain in Taroko National Park, Heping District, Taichung, Taiwan with an elevation of 3,742 m (12,277 ft). It is the 5th highest mountain in Taiwan.

Nanhu Salamander (Hynobius glacialis) is a rare salamander that was first described from this mountain.

== See also ==
- 100 Peaks of Taiwan
- List of mountains in Taiwan
