= Alishan Range =

Mountain range in central southern Taiwan

Coordinates: 23°31′38″N 120°43′40″E

Alishan Mountain Range
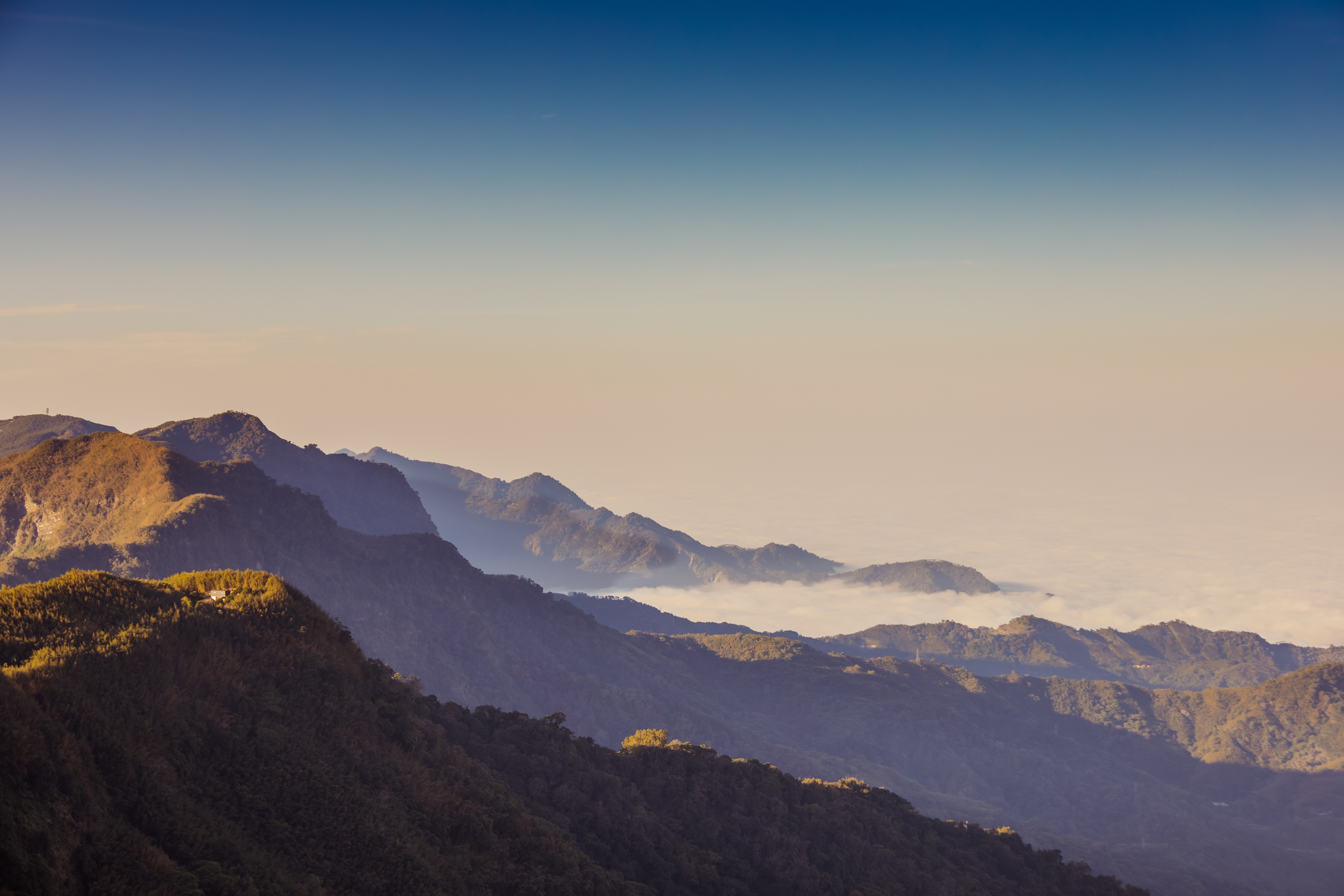

Highest point
- Elevation: 2,663 m (8,737 ft)

Dimensions
- Length: 90 km (56 mi)

Naming
- Native name: 阿里山山脈群 (Chinese)

Geography
- Location: Taiwan

Geology
- Mountain type: Mountain range

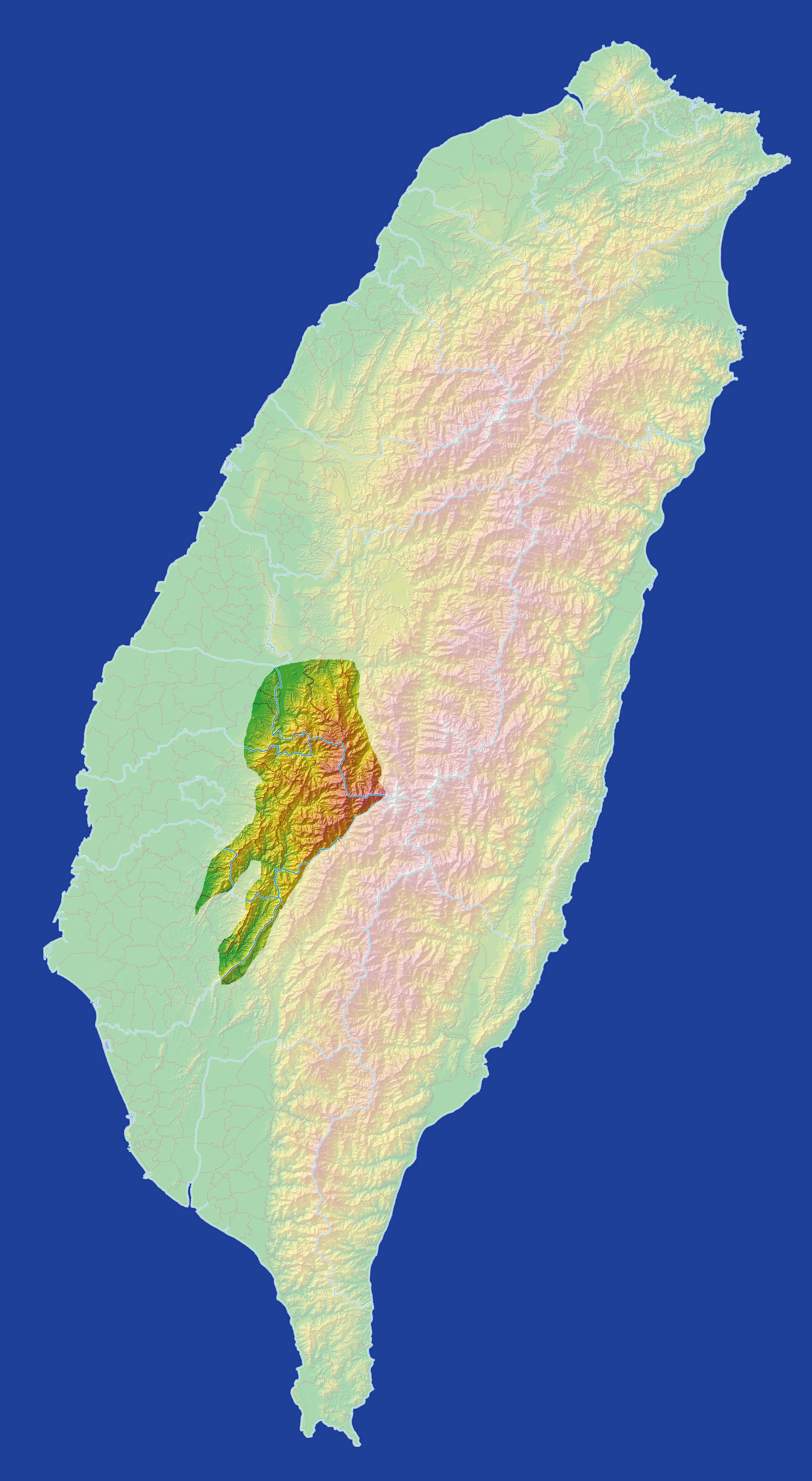
Alishan Range area in Taiwan

The Alishan Range (Chinese: 阿里山山脈; pinyin: Ālǐ Shān Shānmài) is a mountain range in the central-southern region of Taiwan. It is separated by the Qishan River from the Yushan Range, the tallest range in Taiwan, to the east of the Alishan Range. The highest peak of the Alishan Range is Datashan (大塔山), which has a height of 2,663 m (8,737 ft).

== History ==
The name Ali Shan seems to be taken from the word "Alit", which in several Taiwanese indigenous languages means "ancestor mountain".

Although primarily filmed in Hualien, the 1949 film Happenings in Ali Shan is set in the Alishan Range. Co-directed by Chang Cheh and Cheung Ying, Happenings in Ali Shan is the first Mandarin film to be fully produced in Taiwan. The film's theme song, "Gao Shan Qing" (高山青; "The High Green Mountain") also known as (阿里山的姑娘; Ālǐ shān de gūniáng; 'Alishan Range's Maidens') is a particularly famous song in the Sinophone world.

== See also ==
- Alishan National Scenic Area
- Alishan Forest Railway
