= Central Mountain Range =

Principal mountain range on Taiwan Island

Central Mountain Range 中央山脈
- Chungyang Range
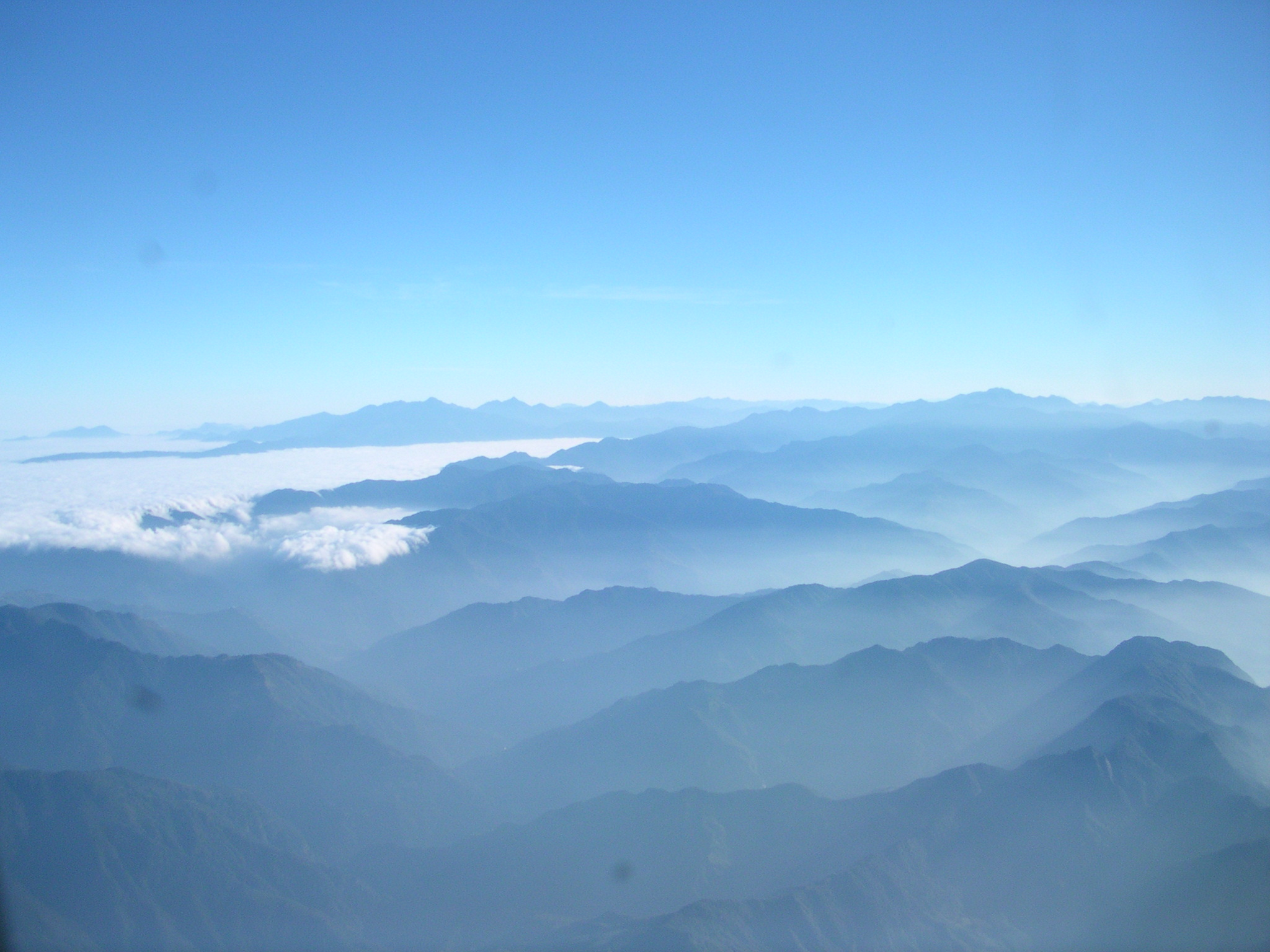

Highest point
- Peak: Mount Xiuguluan
- Elevation: 3,860 m (12,660 ft)
- Coordinates: 23°11′N 120°54′E

Dimensions
- Length: 310 km (190 mi)

Naming
- Native name: 中央山脈 (Chinese)

Geography
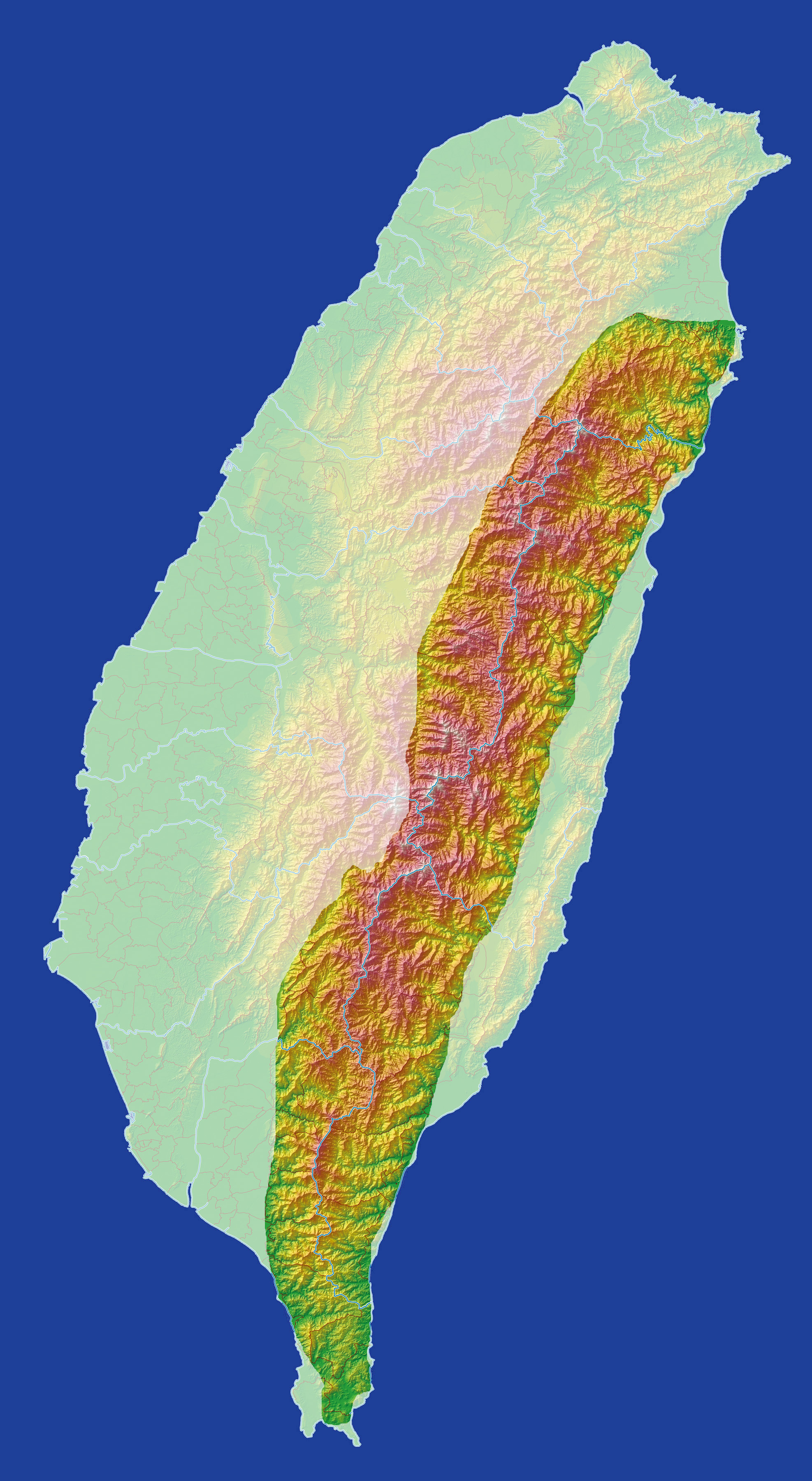
- The Central Mountain Range highlighted on a map of Taiwan
- Location: Taiwan

Geology
- Mountain type: Mountain range

Central Mountain Range
- Traditional Chinese: 中央山脈
- Simplified Chinese: 中央山脉
Transcriptions
Standard Mandarin
- Hanyu Pinyin: Zhōngyāng Shānmài; Zhōngyāng Shānmò
- Wade–Giles: Chung^{1}-yang^{1} Shan^{1}-mai^{4} Chung^{1}-yang^{1} Shan^{1}-mo^{4}
Southern Min
- Hokkien POJ: Tiong-iong Soaⁿ-me̍h
- Tâi-lô: Tiong-iong Suann-me̍h

Former names

Ta-shan
- Chinese: 大山
- Literal meaning: Big Mountains
Transcriptions
Standard Mandarin
- Hanyu Pinyin: Dàshān
- Wade–Giles: Ta^{4}-shan^{1}

The Central Mountain Range is the principal mountain range on Taiwan Island. It runs from the north of the island to the south. It acts as a barrier between the east and west coasts, hindering travel. The tallest peak of the range is Mount Xiuguluan, 3,860 m (12,664 ft).

== Names ==
"Central Range" or "Central Mountain Range" is a calque of the range's Chinese name, the Zhōngyāng Shānmài or Shānmò. It is also sometimes simply called the Zhongyang or Chungyang Range in English.

During the Qing dynasty, the range was known as the Ta-shan, from the Wade–Giles romanization of the Chinese name Dàshān, meaning "Big Mountains".

== Geography ==
In a broad sense, Central Mountain Range includes its conjoint ranges such as Xueshan Range and Yushan Range; thus the tallest peak of Central Mountain Range in this sense is Yushan (Jade Mountain/Mount Morrison), 3,952 m (12,966 ft), and the second tallest peak is Xueshan (Snow Mountain), 3,886 m (12,749 ft).

== Ecology ==
The Central Range lies within the Taiwan subtropical evergreen forests ecoregion, and the composition of the forest varies with elevation. The coastal plains and lower elevations are covered by evergreen laurel-Castanopsis forests dominated by Cryptocarya chinensis and Castanopsis hystrix with scattered stands of the subtropical pine Pinus massoniana. As elevation increases, the evergreen broadleaf trees are gradually replaced by deciduous broadleaf trees and conifers. At higher elevations, Cyclobalanopsis glauca replaces laurel and Castanopsis as the dominant tree.

Above 3,000 m (9,840 ft), deciduous broadleaf trees like Formosan alder (Alnus formosana) and maple (Acer spp.) mix with Taiwan hemlock (Tsuga chinensis). At the highest elevations, subalpine forests are dominated by conifers, including Taiwan hemlock, Taiwan spruce (Picea morrisonicola), and Taiwan fir (Abies kawakamii).

== See also ==
- Geography of Taiwan
