= Jiujiu Cabins =

Mountain huts in Taiwan

- 九九山莊
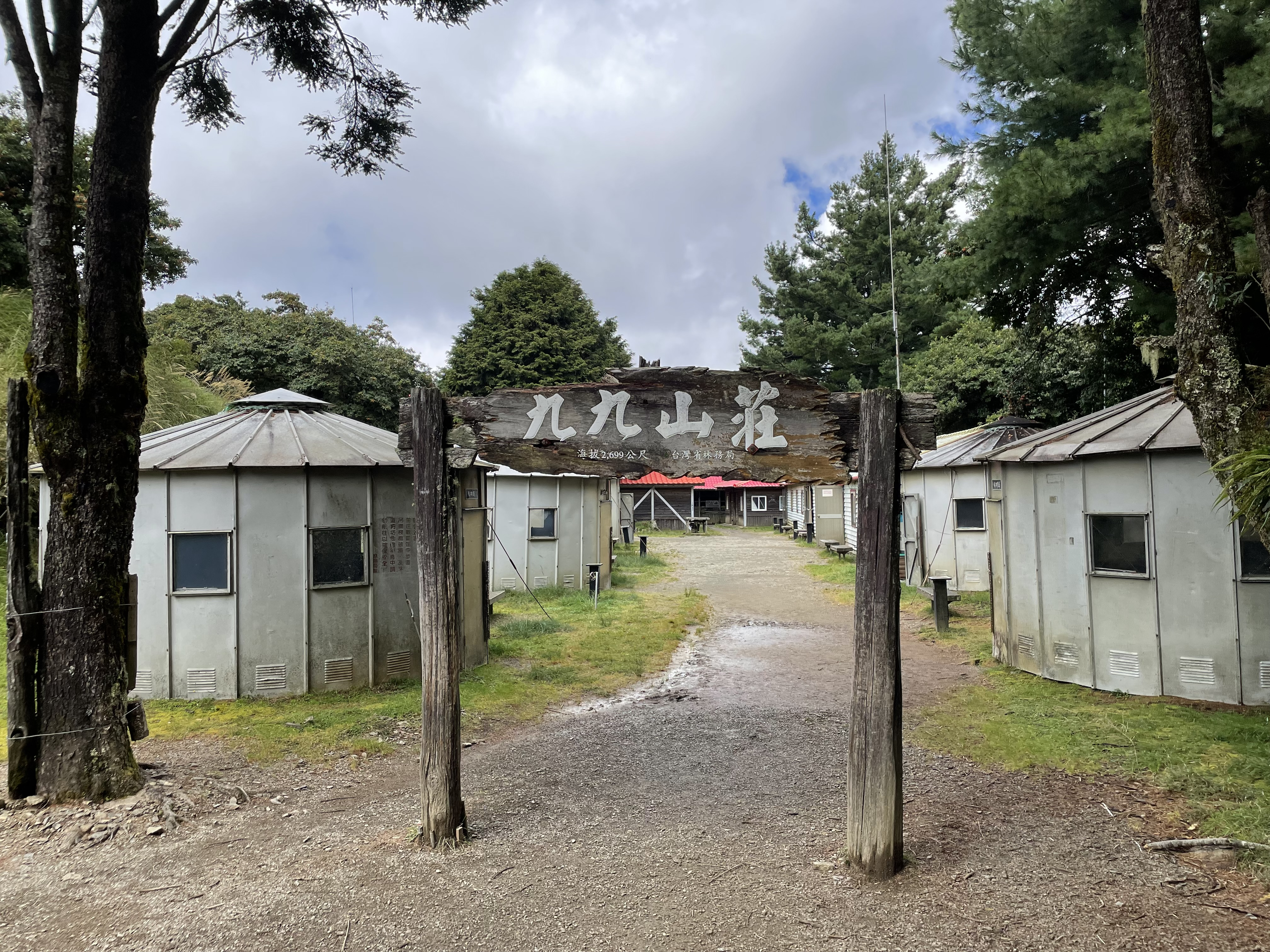
- Jiujiu Cabins (2024)
- Interactive map of the Jiujiu Cabins area

General information
- Status: Completed
- Classification: Alpine accommodation
- Location: Shei-Pa National Park, Tai'an Township, Miaoli County, Taiwan
- Coordinates: 24°28′08.7″N 121°12′29.9″E
- Elevation: 2,699 metres (8,855 ft)
- Owner: Hsinchu Branch, Forestry and Nature Conservation Agency, Ministry of Agriculture
- Landlord: Hsinchu Branch, Forestry and Nature Conservation Agency, Ministry of Agriculture

Other information
- Number of restaurants: 1
- Facilities: Accommodation capacity 150 people, water supply, public toilets, solar power system, lithium-ion battery energy storage system
- Parking: No
- Public transit: No

Website
- https://99online.forest.gov.tw/

Jiujiu Cabins (traditional Chinese: 九九山莊; simplified Chinese: 九九山庄) is an accommodation mountain lodge in Taiwan, located in Shei-Pa National Park, in Tai'an Township, Miaoli County, at an altitude of 2,699 metres (8,855 ft). It is named after the number 99 in its altitude. The lodge complex belongs to the Hsinchu Branch, Forestry and Nature Conservation Agency, Ministry of Agriculture. It includes Chengkung Yurts, a restaurant (reception room), Longmen Inns, a machine room, toilet, etc., all of which are separate buildings. Jiujiu Cabins uses a solar power system and is equipped with a lithium-ion battery energy storage system to cope with the intermittent nature of renewable energy. It can currently accommodate 150 people. It has clean running water (but currently no hot water) and a mobile phone communication point.

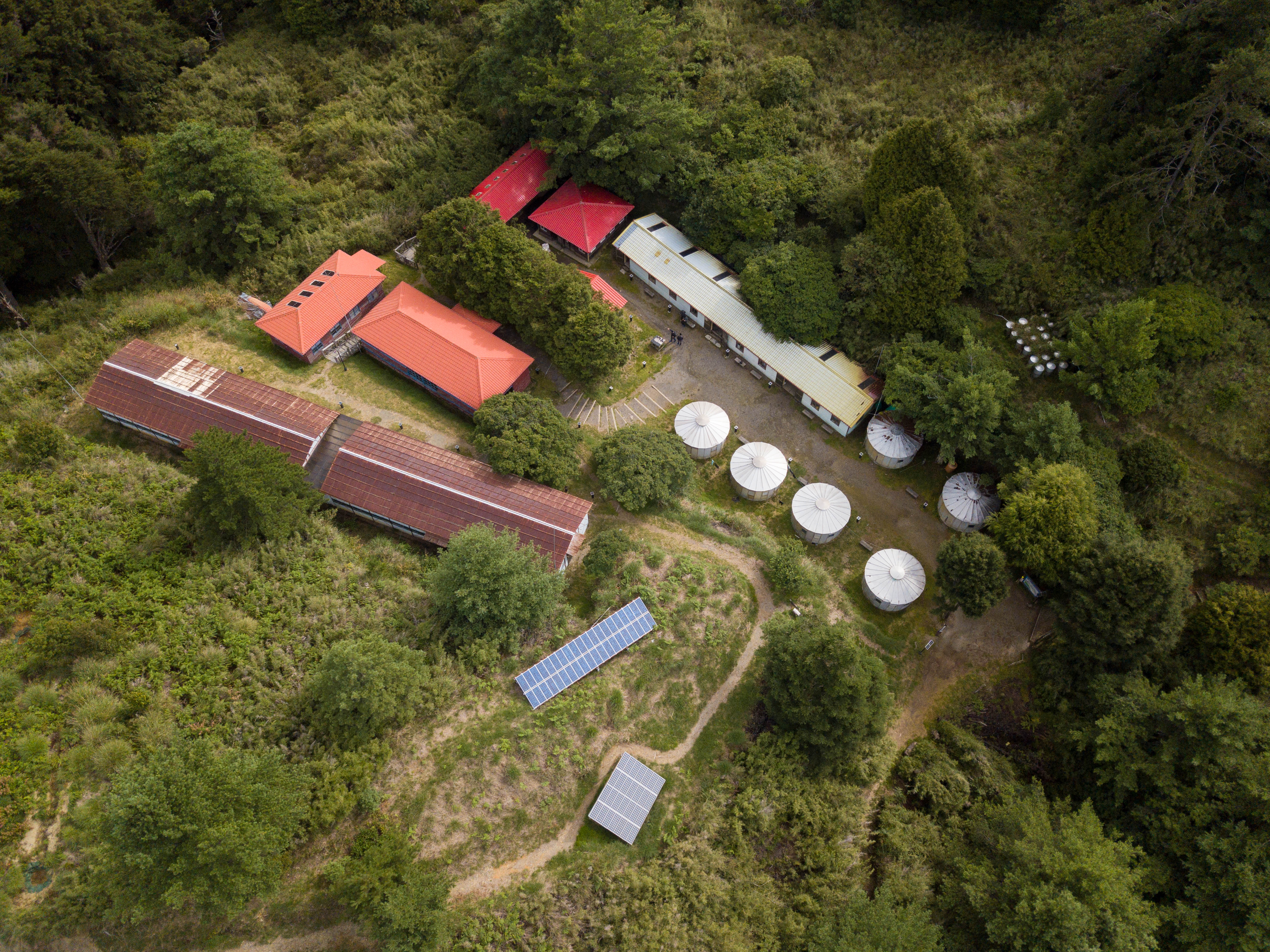
Jiujiu Cabins (Aerial Photography) (2021) The lodge complex. It includes Chengkung Yurts, restaurant (reception room), Longmen Inns, machine room, toilet, etc., all of which are separate buildings.

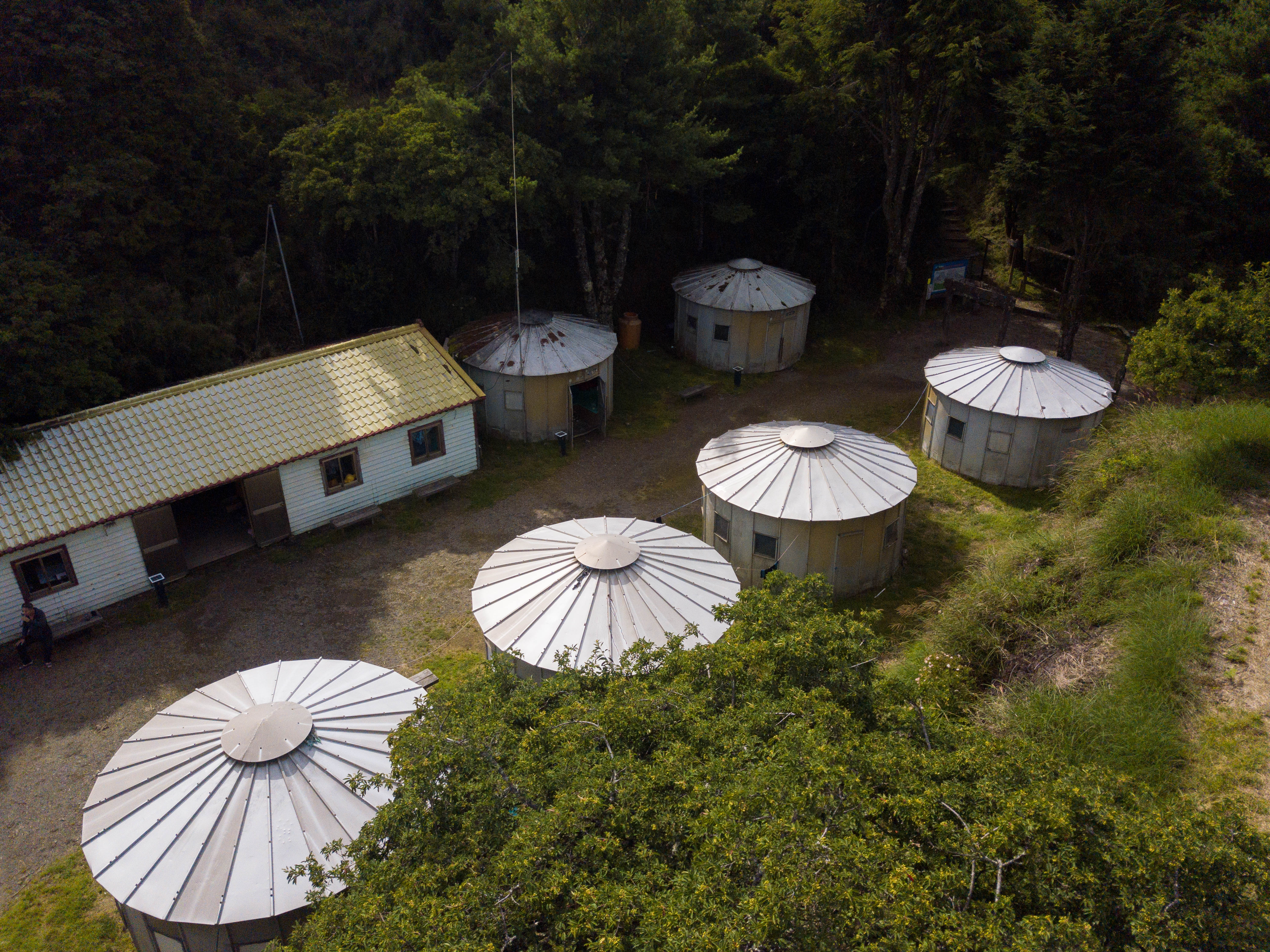
Chengkung Yurts in Jiujiu Cabins (Aerial Photography) (2021) These six Chengkung Yurts are made of metal and are round mountain houses in the shape of yurts.

== History ==
In the 1960s, Jiujiu Cabins was built with lead sheets in the shape of a yurt, which is a common memory of mountain climbers and was later called "Chengkung Yurt". These six Chengkung Yurts are made of metal and are round mountain houses in the shape of yurts.

Since 1971, in order to cooperate with the China Youth Corps in organizing the Dabajian Mountain hiking event, the Forestry Bureau has opened a hiking trail about 12 kilometers long from the Dalu Forest Road Madala Creek Trailhead to Dabajian Mountain. In addition, Jiujiu Cabins were built in the mountain valley on the west side of the shoulder ridge in the northwest of Jiali Mountain to provide accommodation for the hiking team. To date, there are 6 Chengkung Yurts and 3 Longmen Inns as accommodation spaces, all of which are dormitory-style (with soft mattresses). Hikers need to bring their own sleeping bags and other equipment.

== Geography ==
Jiujiu Cabins are an important place for mountain enthusiasts to stay and rest on their way to Daba Peaks (Dabajian Mountain, Xiaobajian Mountain, Yizhe Mountain, Jiali Mountain, etc.). They usually drive from Dalu Forest Road to Guanwu National Forest Recreation Area, and then hike along the flat forest road to the 19 km mark of Madala Creek Trailhead, and then continue for another 4 km along the mountain trail to reach Jiujiu Cabins.

== Management ==
Jiujiu Cabins have set up a service station and management personnel. Services include: checking the roster of guests, their identification documents, and proof of their accommodation application; registering information of those arriving and departing on the same day; providing information on mountain safety, Leave No Trace principles, and related precautions; and handling emergency contact matters.

Hikers can apply for accommodation through the "Hike Smart Taiwan Service" website. Upon arrival at the lodge, the administrator (commonly referred to as the lodge owner) will arrange a bed.

== Energy and electric power systems ==
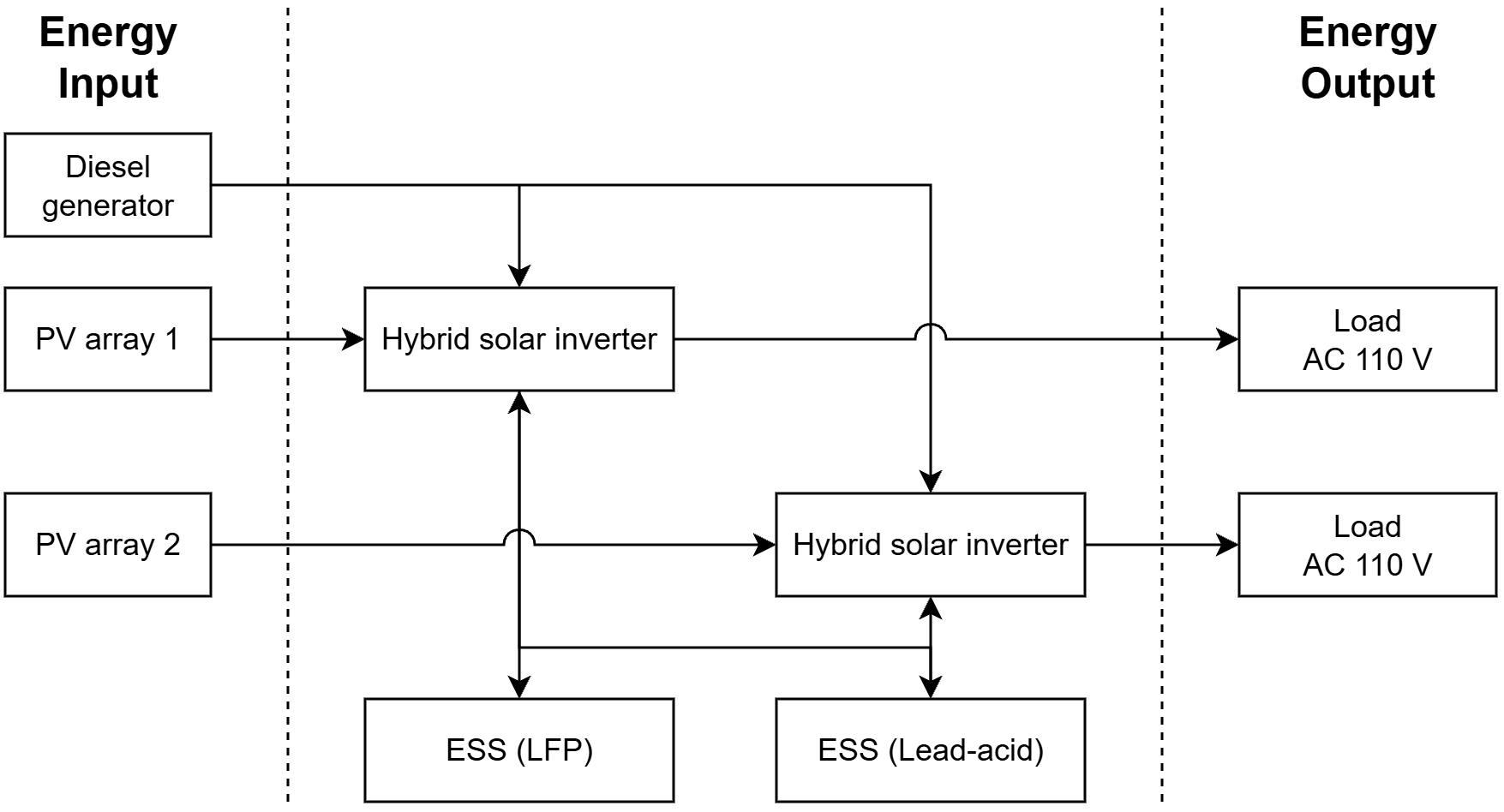
Energy Architecture of Jiujiu Cabins (2021) The off-grid solar energy storage system of Jiujiu Cabins is composed of two independent power supply systems combined with the same hybrid energy storage system.

Owing to the difficulty of connecting to the power grid in high-altitude areas, energy supply remains a challenging problem. Off-grid solar energy storage systems provide a feasible solution for using renewable energy in high-altitude areas and have been proven.

Although the Hsinchu Forest District Office, Forestry Bureau carried out a solar panel improvement project in 2003, the system may have undergone several changes over the past decade, and it is impossible to know which companies handled it, which has led to the system becoming complex and difficult to maintain. The aging of the energy system caused multiple system failures. In order to understand the energy system status of Jiujiu Cabins, on May, 2021, the Hsinchu Forest District Office, “Wei-Chih, CHEN Architect & Associates,” and Super Double Power Technology conducted an on-site survey at Jiujiu Cabins.

In order to restore the operation of the energy system, the Hsinchu Forest District Office, Forestry Bureau commissioned Super Double Power Technology Co., Ltd. to improve the existing solar energy system of Jiujiu Cabins in 2021. After restructuring and improvement, the off-grid solar energy storage system of Jiujiu Cabins is composed of two independent power supply systems combined with the same energy storage system architecture. Among them, the first set of solar input hybrid solar inverters can transmit power to AC loads. The second set of solar inputs can transmit power to another set of AC loads after another hybrid solar inverter. The two sets of hybrid solar inverters share the same hybrid energy storage system, which consists of a newly established lithium iron phosphate battery energy storage system and an existing lead-acid battery energy storage system. In addition, a new backup power input terminal is added, which can be connected to an external generator as a backup power source.

== Cooperation among local indigenous peoples ==
The Hsinchu Forest District Office of the Forestry Bureau stated that at present, most of the catering and accommodation services of mountain huts in Taiwan are handled through labor commissioning or public bidding. However, in order to protect the local tribal industries and livelihoods and to comply with the spirit of The Indigenous Peoples Basic Law, the office has invited local tribes in Wufeng Township and Jianshi Township, Hsinchu County, and Tai'an Township, Miaoli County, which are near Jiujiu Cabins, to hold briefings and communication sessions to reach a consensus.

The Jiujiu Cabins service does not include meals. In addition to cooking for themselves, hikers often hire mountain guides to provide meals. In 2021, the Hsinchu Forest District Office of the Forestry Bureau, in order to implement the management of Jiujiu Cabins and promote the cooperation of local indigenous people and the development of the mountaineering industry, cooperated with “Bunung Kalibuwan Enterprise” and “Hsinchu County Indigenous Youth Association” to sign a contract for the lodge's catering and lodging services, hoping to achieve the goal of sustainable and safe mountaineering.
