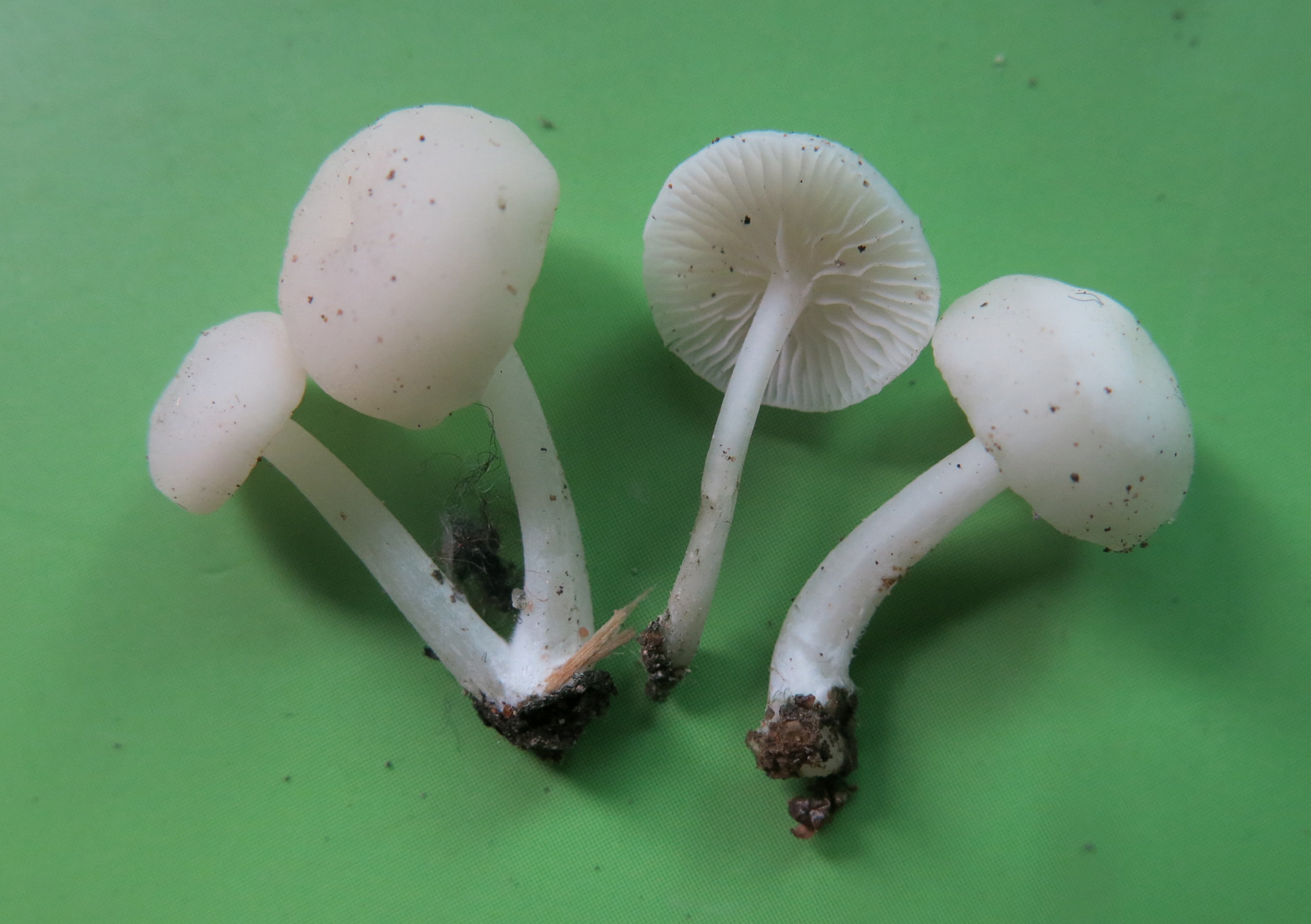

Scientific classification
- Kingdom: Fungi
- Division: Basidiomycota
- Class: Agaricomycetes
- Order: Agaricales
- Family: Marasmiaceae
- Genus: Lactocollybia
- Species: L. subvariicystis

Binomial name
- Lactocollybia subvariicystis Iqbal Hosen & T.H. Li

= Lactocollybia subvariicystis =

Species of fungus

Lactocollybia subvariicystis is a fungus in the Lactocollybia genus. Species in this genus are little known in China. This species is reported from subtropical south China in 2016. It is characterized by its small, white, hygrophanous basidiomata, sinuate to adnexed lamellae, common presence of gloeocystidia in the context of pileus, lamellae and stipe which is sharply tapering at both ends, and found on the living trunk of Acacia confusa.
