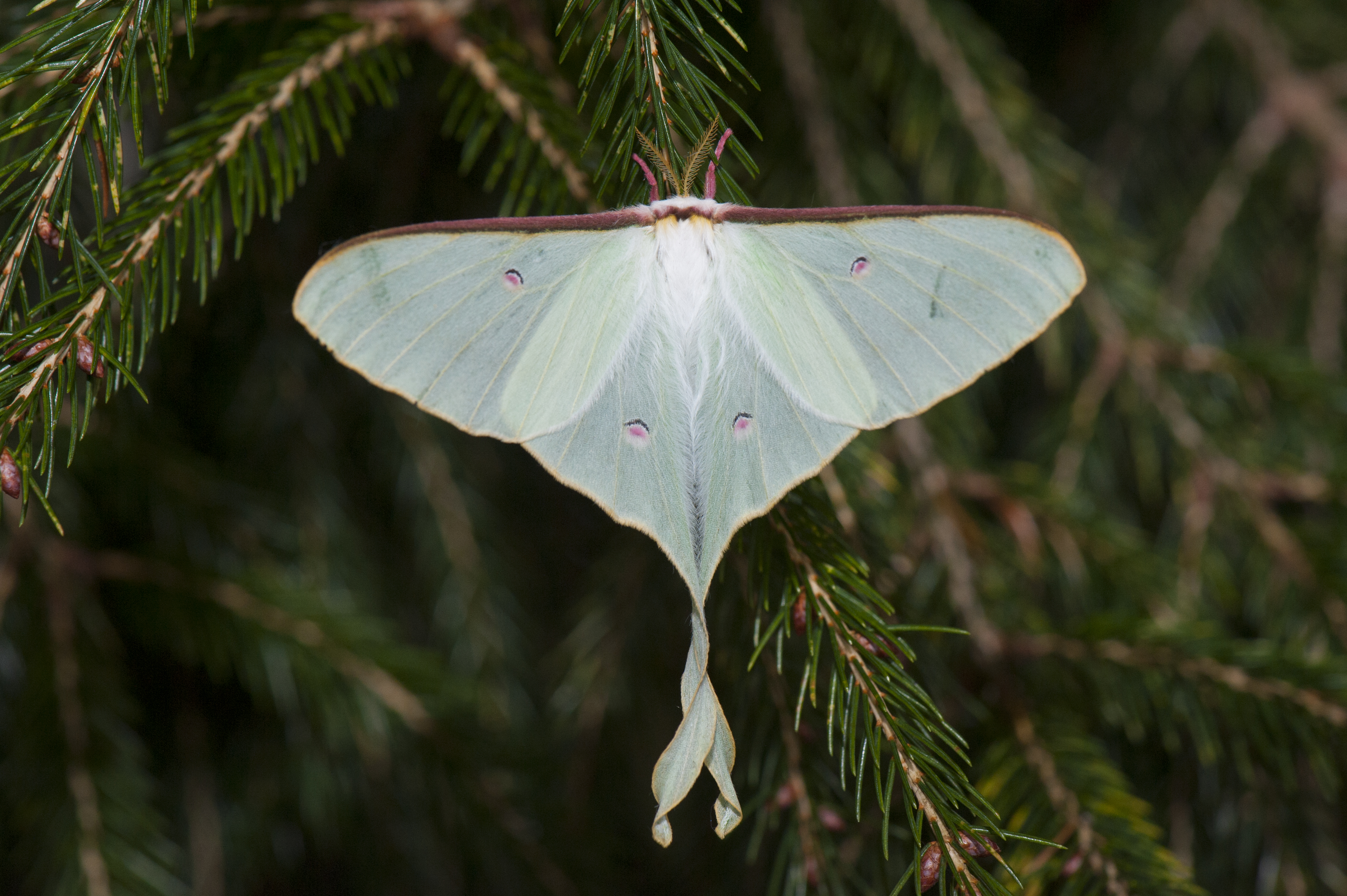

Scientific classification
- Kingdom: Animalia
- Phylum: Arthropoda
- Clade: Pancrustacea
- Class: Insecta
- Order: Lepidoptera
- Family: Saturniidae
- Genus: Actias
- Species: A. neidhoeferi

Binomial name
- Actias neidhoeferi Ong et Yu, 1968

Synonyms
- Notodonta gigantea Elwes, 1890; Acmeshachia takamukui Matsumura, 1929

= Actias neidhoeferi =

Species of moth

Actias neidhoederi is a species of moth belonging to the family Saturniidae. It is endemic to Taiwan.

== Discovery ==
Actias neidhoederi was first described by Sheng-Keng Ong and Ching-Chin Yu in 1968. It is believed that they were the first two Taiwanese to describe a new species of moth. The publication of this species is based on several specimens collected from the Neng-gao Mountain area, Nantou. The male holotype is deposited at the Carnegie Museums of Pittsburgh in the United States, while five paratype male specimens and one allotype female specimen are deposited at the Milwaukee Public Museum in the United States.

== Origins of the name ==
The species epithet neidhoeferi honours James R. Neidhoefer, an active researcher of Samia cynthia, insect collector and trader, to commemorate the profound friendship that binds us across the Pacific.

It is relatively smaller compared to the other two lower-altitude species of the genus Actias in Taiwan. This publication garnered significant attention from Japanese collectors and researchers, who were enthusiastic about exploring Taiwan's insect fauna at the time. In 1970 and 1972, Tamotsu Miyata, a Japanese researcher, supplemented further morphological descriptions of this species, which was considered extremely rare at the time, through two articles. It took 45 years from the first description of this new species for Hsu-Hong Lin and others to publish a complete description of its life cycle, in 2013, documenting for the first time that its larvae feed on Taiwan Fir and Taiwan Hemlock, making it a representative moth species of Taiwan's high mountains.
