= Tai'an Hot Spring =

Hot spring in Tai'an, Miaoli County, Taiwan

- 泰安溫泉
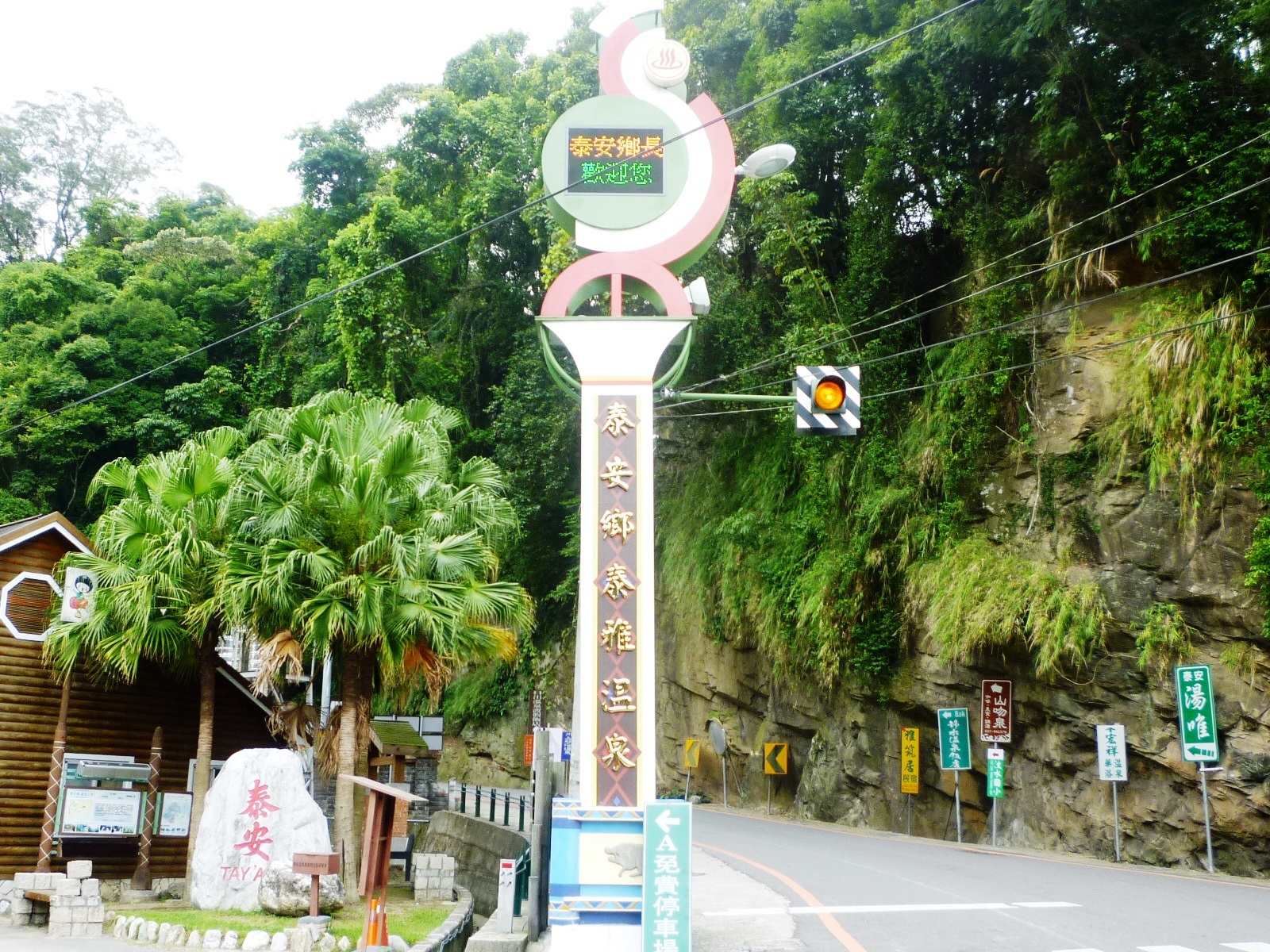

- Location within Miaoli County
- Interactive map of Tai'an Hot Spring
- Location: Tai'an, Miaoli County, Taiwan
- Coordinates: 24°28′16.3″N 120°58′38.7″E
- Type: hot spring

The Tai'an Hot Spring (traditional Chinese: 泰安溫泉; simplified Chinese: 泰安温泉; pinyin: Tài'ān Wēnquán) is a hot spring in Tai'an Township, Miaoli County, Taiwan.

== History ==
The hot spring was originally named the Ueshima Hot Spring during the Japanese rule of Taiwan. After the handover of Taiwan from Japan to the Republic of China in 1945, it was renamed to Hu Mountain Hot Spring. In 1978, President Chiang Ching-kuo visited the hot spring and renamed it as Tai'an Hot Spring.

== Features ==
The hot spring water is colorless and odorless. It has a temperature of 47°C.

== Transportation ==
The hot spring is accessible by bus and taxi from Miaoli Station of Taiwan Railway.

== See also ==
- List of tourist attractions in Taiwan
- Taiwanese hot springs
