= Tianchi Lodge =

Mountain lodge in Taiwan

- 天池山莊
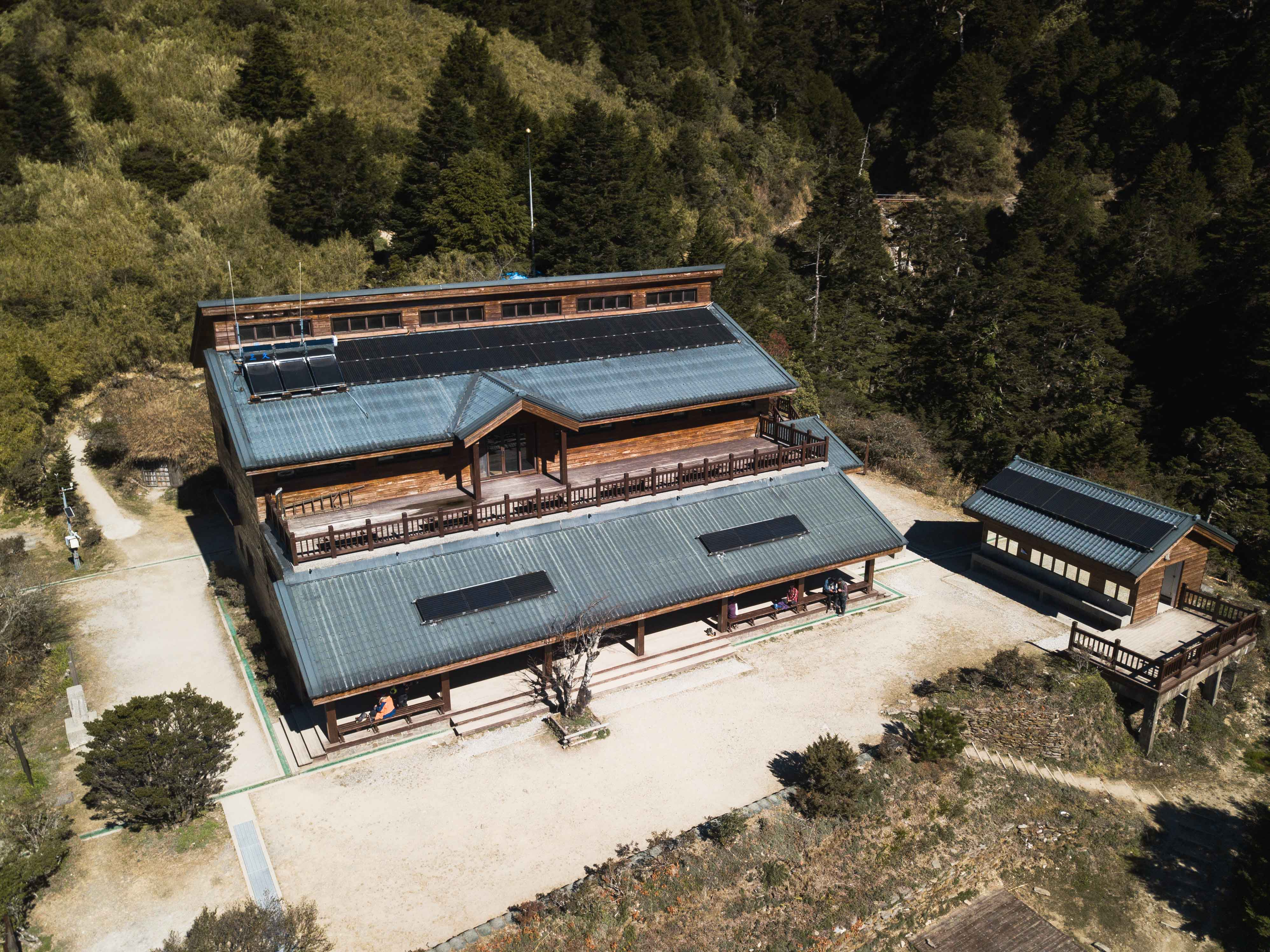
- Tianchi Lodge (2019)
- Interactive map of the Tianchi Lodge area

General information
- Status: Completed
- Type: Two-story steel frame structure
- Classification: Alpine accommodation
- Location: No. 100, Jhongsing Ln., Ren'ai Township, Nantou County 546023, Taiwan, Ren'ai Township, Nantou County, Taiwan
- Coordinates: 24°02′43.15″N 121°16′46.77″E
- Elevation: 2,860 metres (9,380 ft)
- Construction started: 2011; 15 years ago
- Completed: June 2012; 14 years ago
- Opened: 2013; 13 years ago
- Owner: Nantou Branch, Forestry and Nature Conservation Agency, Ministry of Agriculture, Taiwan
- Landlord: Nantou Branch, Forestry and Nature Conservation Agency, Ministry of Agriculture, Taiwan

Design and construction
- Architecture firm: Wu, Hsia-Hsiung Architect & Associates
- Awards: 2011-2012 Excellent Agricultural Construction Project Award (Architecture Category)
- Known for: Mountainous "Five-Star" Luxury Lodge

Other information
- Number of restaurants: 1
- Facilities: Accommodation capacity 88 people, water supply, public toilets, solar power system, lithium-ion battery energy storage system
- Parking: No
- Public transit: No

Website
- tconline.forest.gov.tw

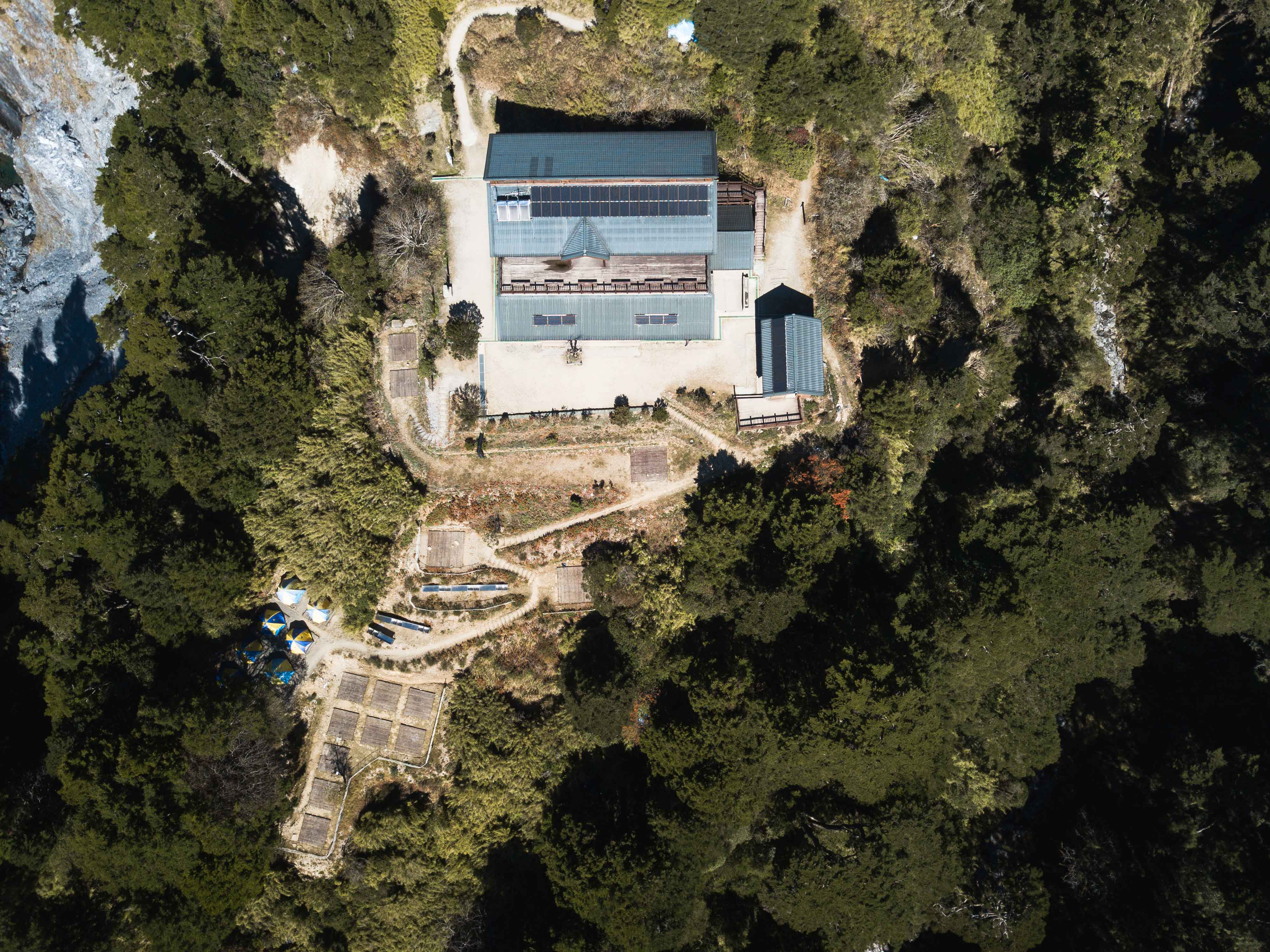
Tianchi Lodge and campsites (Aerial Photography) (2019) There are 26 campsites. (23 small campsites (3m*3m) and 3 large campsites (4m*4m))

Tianchi Lodge (traditional Chinese: 天池山莊; simplified Chinese: 天池山庄) is an accommodation mountain lodge in Taiwan, located at an altitude of 2,860 metres (9,380 ft), at kilometer 13.1 of the Nenggao Cross-Ridge Historic Trail. It is situated in a sheltered mountain valley on the west side of the North Peak of Nenggao, under the jurisdiction of the Nantou Branch, Forestry and Nature Conservation Agency, Ministry of Agriculture. Its administrative area is located in Ren'ai Township, Nantou County. It has been through several fires and reconstructions.

The current Tianchi Lodge utilizes natural lighting, has solar panels installed on the roof, generates electricity using renewable energy, and is equipped with a lithium-ion battery energy storage system. Its electricity can provide hot water and nighttime lighting for the lodge. The specially designed sloping roof allows rain and snow to flow down smoothly. The lodge is near two waterfalls, so there is no shortage of water. It will not be short of water during the dry season. It is a truly environmentally friendly green building. The lodge also features a specially designed viewing platform on the second floor with large, operable glass windows, allowing visitors to enjoy the surrounding mountain scenery. The entrance corridor is spacious and includes a public social space with tea, tables, and chairs, providing hikers with a more comfortable activity space. Due to these architectural designs and infrastructure, Tianchi Lodge has been dubbed a "five-star" luxury lodge in the mountain community by hikers.

Currently, Tianchi Lodge offers 3 rooms for twelve people, 4 rooms for eight people, and 5 rooms for four people, which can accommodate a total of 88 people. As for the campsite, there are 26 campsites (23 small campsites and 3 large campsites). A total of 188 people can stay there each day.

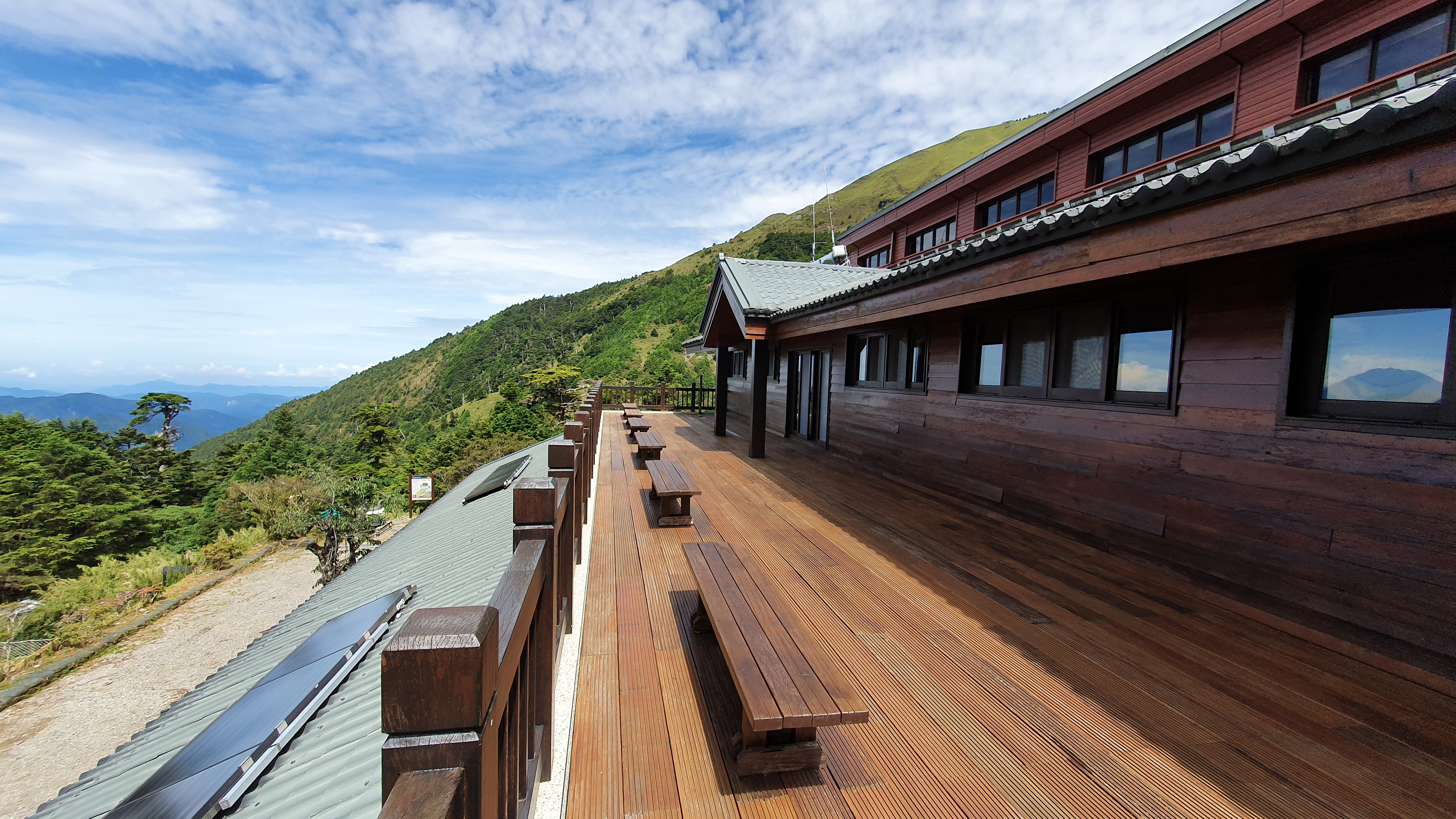
Viewing platform on the second floor of Tianchi Lodge (2022) Large, operable windows and chairs provide hikers with a more comfortable space to enjoy the surrounding mountain scenery.

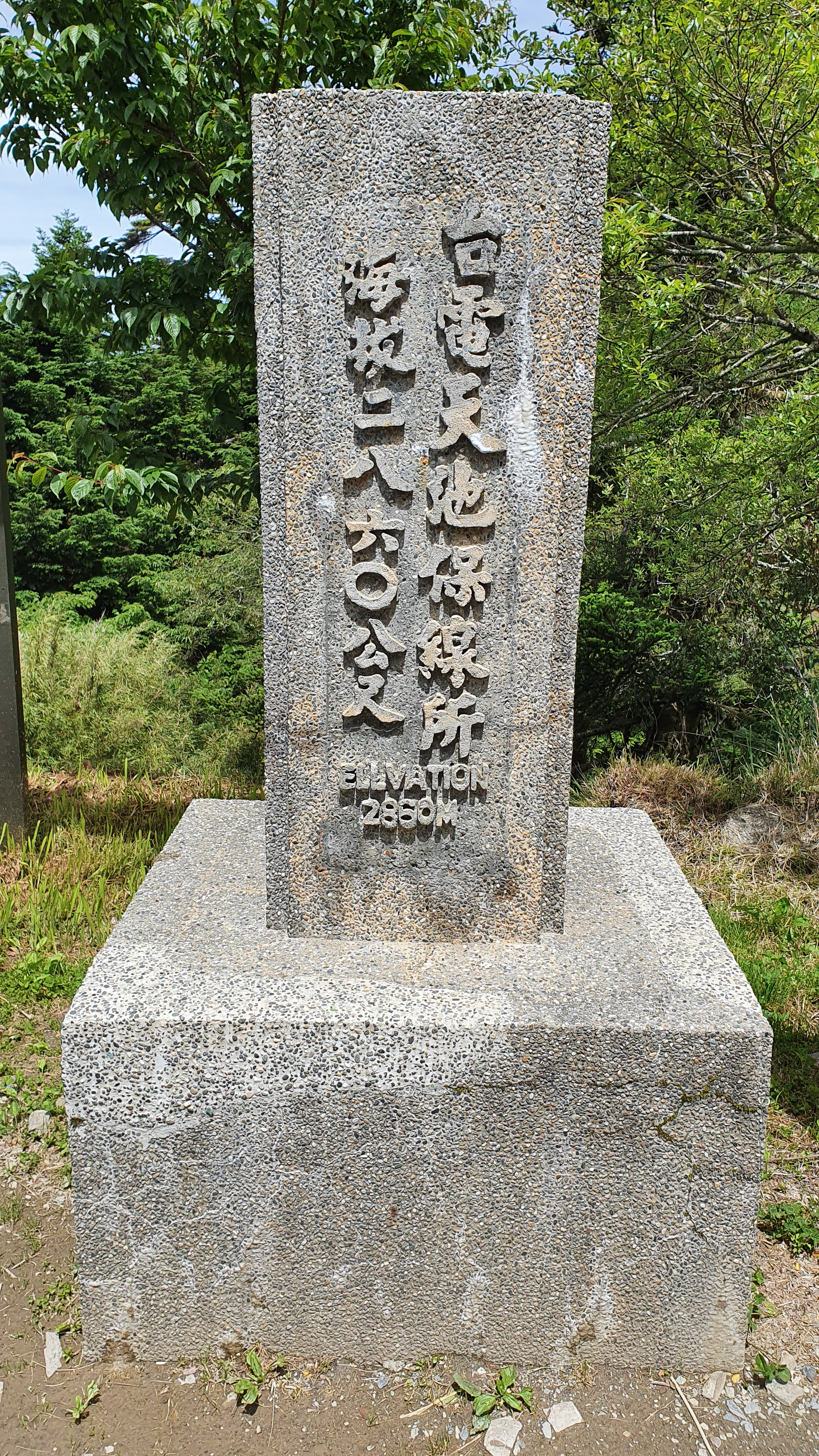
The "Tianchi Line Protection Station" marker stone It reads "Taipower Tianchi Line Protection Station, Elevation 2860 meters.

== History ==
The Nenggao Garrison was the predecessor of the Tianchi Lodge. In September 1918, when the Nenggao Cross-Ridge Historic Trail was completed, the Nenggao Garrison was established for the needs of road maintenance and mail delivery. It was an elegant, well-equipped Japanese-style building made of cypress wood that could accommodate 100 people. During the Japanese occupation, it was called "Nenggao Cypress Palace". At that time, the Japanese deployed police forces here to carry out the duties of the garrison and to receive high-ranking generals who were intensively inspecting the area for political and military purposes.

In 1930, during the Musha Incident initiated by the Seediq people, the garrison was burned down. After the Musha Incident, the Japanese rebuilt the cypress house on the original site in 1931, with the same style as the Onoue Garrison (Yunhai Line Station). In the early postwar period, the Nationalist government came to Taiwan and Taiwan Power Company implemented the "East-to-West Power Transmission" policy. In order to meet the needs of Taiwan Power Company's east–west power transmission lines, the Tianchi Line Station was used. Until it was burned down in 1986, it was the most famous high-altitude luxury accommodation among mountain climbers.

The Tianchi Lodge, rebuilt in 1993, was a tin-roofed mountain hut that could accommodate about 60 people. It was managed by the Forestry Bureau (now the Forestry and Nature Conservation Agency) and had a kitchen, a gas stove for cooking, and a diesel generator that provided electricity at night. As the number of mountain climbers increased, far exceeding the lodge's capacity and affecting the surrounding environment, and after years of use, the tin-roofed mountain huts had rusted in many places due to the high altitude, low temperature, strong winds, and rainy conditions, affecting structural safety, the Forestry Bureau decided to rebuild it after careful review.

The Forestry Bureau commissioned Wu, Hsia-Hsiung Architect & Associates in 2003 and 2005 to plan and design the renovation of Tianchi Lodge. Tianchi Lodge was demolished and rebuilt on its original site in 2011. The project was constructed by Sinyuan Construction Co., Ltd. and supervised by Huangrueiming Architects. The concept of green building design was introduced during the reconstruction. It is a two-story steel structure building with a roof facing due south. It is equipped with solar water heating panels (solar water heating system), a solar power generation system, and uses natural materials such as wood and gravel to replace premixed concrete. It is constructed with earthquake-resistant steel structure and fireproof paint. It has rooms, a restaurant, a kitchen, a toilet, and a solar power generation system. It is planned to have five eight-person rooms, twelve three-person rooms, and four six-person rooms, which can accommodate one hundred mountain enthusiasts. It was completed in June 2012. It opened to the public in 2013. The exterior is magnificent and spectacular, with the grandeur of the former Nenggao Cypress Palace. The Tianchi Lodge construction project won the “2011-2012 Excellent Agricultural Construction Project Award (Architecture Category)”.

Starting in May 2020, the Nantou Branch of the Forestry Agency carried out a renovation project on the Tianchi Lodge for about four months, including exterior renovation, waterproofing, and surrounding facilities, in response to the policy of opening up the mountains and forests. The Tianchi Lodge is powered entirely by solar green energy. The lead-acid battery energy storage system used to store electricity was old and not environmentally friendly. During this renovation project, it was also replaced with a more efficient and environmentally friendly lithium-ion battery energy storage system, which can achieve better energy storage effect with a smaller volume.

Brief building history of Tianchi Lodge
Year	Status	Building type	Accommodation capacity (people)	Owner	References
1918	Built	Wooden garrison	~100 (Official use only)	Japanese government	
1931	Rebuilt	Wooden garrison	N/A (Official use only)	Japanese government	
1993	Rebuilt	Tin-roofed mountain hut	60	Nantou Branch, Forestry and Nature Conservation Agency, MOA, Taiwan	
2012	Rebuilt	Two-story steel frame structure	88	Nantou Branch, Forestry and Nature Conservation Agency, MOA, Taiwan	

== Energy and electric power systems ==
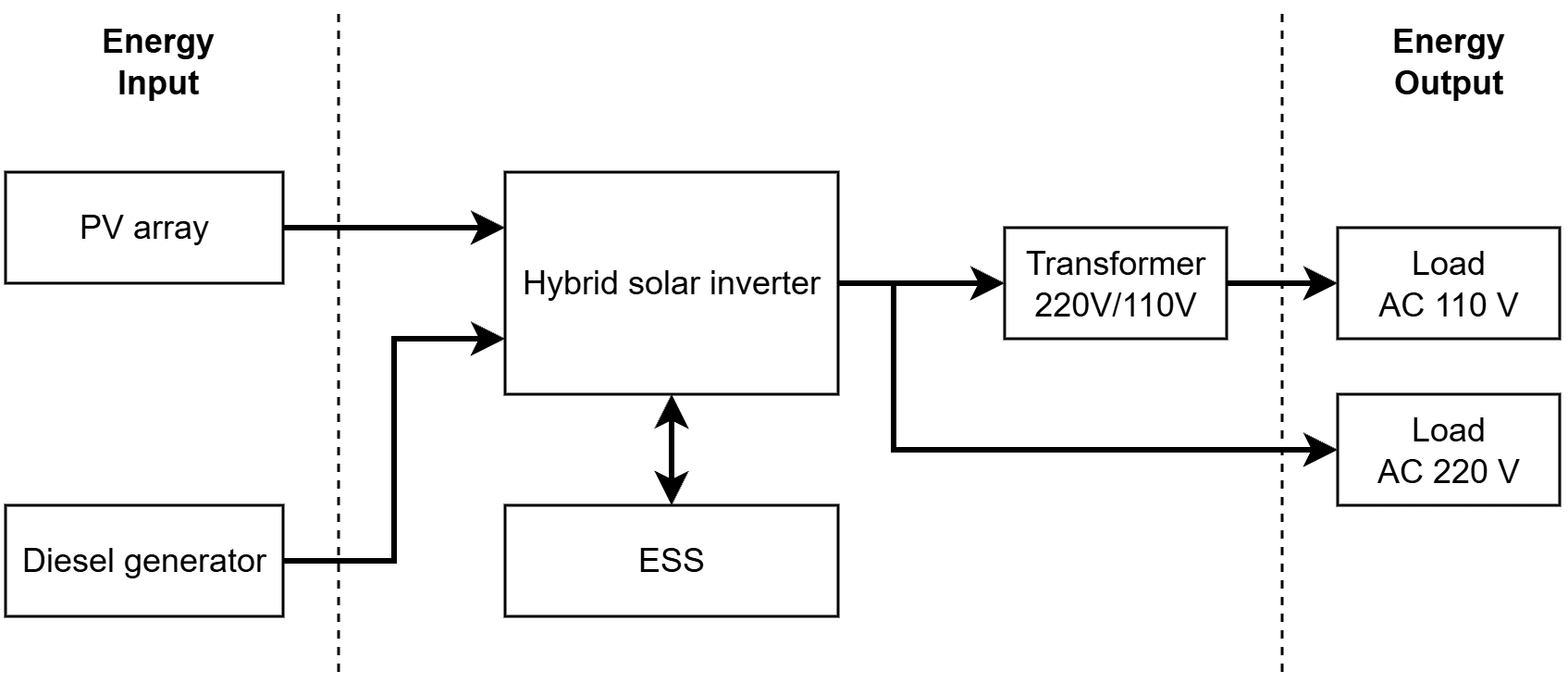
Energy Architecture of Tianchi Lodge (2020) Energy input is provided in part by solar arrays and a diesel generator. The hybrid solar inverters directly supplies power to the lodge's 220V AC load. The power of the 110V AC load is obtained through a transformer (220V/110V). An Energy storage system stores and releases intermittent renewable energy from solar arrays.

Due to the difficulty of grid connection, energy supply in high-altitude areas remains a challenging problem. Off-grid solar energy storage systems provide a feasible solution for using renewable energy in high-altitude areas and have been proven.

In the past, lead-acid battery energy storage systems combined with diesel generators were commonly used. However, the environmental damage caused by lead pollution from lead-acid batteries and their harm to human health have created serious problems for their use in high-altitude areas. Furthermore, lead-acid batteries will age and deteriorate after a few years of use, eventually becoming unable to store electricity.

When Tianchi Lodge officially opened in 2013, it introduced facilities such as a solar power generation system. However, the energy storage system at that time was built using lead-acid batteries, which are less environmentally friendly.

At the end of 2019, the Nantou Forest District Office of the Forestry Bureau decided to install an off-grid solar energy storage system to supply energy to the lodge, and commissioned the C. J. Yan Architect & Associate to carry out planning, design and supervision. The project was contracted by Lighting Art Co., Ltd.. Super Double Power Technology Co., Ltd. installed the system and carried out subsequent maintenance.

In 2020, the off-grid solar energy storage system of Tianchi Lodge was installed by Super Double Power Technology Co., Ltd. and began to supply energy to the lodge. Its power architecture is generated by solar arrays, which charge the lithium-ion battery energy storage system through a hybrid solar inverter, and the inverter supplies power to the lodge's AC load.

== Alpine transportation supplement ==
There are several main ways to transport mountain resources and equipment, such as manual transport, cable cars, and helicopters. The route from the Tunyuan trailhead in Ren'ai Township to the Nenggao Cross-Ridge Historic Trail leading to Tianchi Lodge is quite special, as it is one of the few routes in Taiwan where motorcycles and small four-wheeled transport vehicles can be used for transporting supplies.

However, due to the risk of accidents such as falling into valleys when using motor vehicles, the Nantou Forest District Office announced through the Tianchi Lodge booking website in August 2013 that, for safety reasons and to avoid accidents that could harm people, all personnel entering the Nenggao Cross-Ridge Historic Trail and Tianchi Lodge are strictly prohibited from using vehicles and bicycles except for official business that requires application and approval.
