= Forestry in Taiwan =

Taiwanese forestry industry

Forestry in Taiwan was historically a significant industry. The logging of most of Taiwan's old-growth forest and the protection of what remains has led to the sunset of the industry with remaining stands protected by law. All logging was banned in 1991, but illegal logging remains a significant threat, especially to the oldest and most valuable trees.

== History ==
From 1825 until 1866 a shipyard in Tainan produced wooden warships for the Qing navy out of native wood. Logging for warship production was one of the impetus for the Qing's colonial expansion into Taiwan's mountainous interior.

Major commercial forestry in Taiwan began during the Japanese colonial period with most forestry products being shipped back to Japan. State-run centers of Japanese logging in Taiwan included the Alishan Range, Eight Immortals Mountain, and Taiping Mountain. Logging operations were established around Zhudong, Hsinchu, in the 1940s, and were later consolidated by the Kuomintang-led government as the Zhudong Forestry Center, which were named a historic site in May 2025.

Due to the remoteness and inaccessibility of many regions, some of Taiwan's large trees survived. In 2022 a team of researchers identified 941 trees taller than 65m.

=== Bamboo ===
Taiwanese indigenous peoples have a long history of bamboo cultivation. The Tsou tribe in Alishan harvests stone bamboo (phyllostachys lithophila) but harvests have been negatively impacted by drought.

=== Camphor ===
Camphor has been produced as a forest product for centuries, condensed from the vapor given off by the roasting of wood chips cut from the relevant trees, and later by passing steam through the pulverized wood and condensing the vapors. By the early 19th century most camphor tree reserves had been depleted with the remaining large stands in Japan and Taiwan with Taiwanese production greatly exceeding Japanese. Camphor was one of the primary resources extracted by Taiwan's colonial powers as well as one of the most lucrative. First the Chinese and then the Japanese established monopolies on Taiwanese camphor. In 1868 a British naval force sailed into Anping harbor and the local British representative demanded the end of the Chinese camphor monopoly, after the local Qing representative refused the British bombarded the town and took the harbor. The "camphor regulations” negotiated between the two sides subsequently saw a brief end to the camphor monopoly. When its use in the nascent chemical industries greatly increased the volume of demand in the late 19th century, potential for changes in supply and in price followed. In 1911 Robert Kennedy Duncan, an industrial chemist and educator, related that the Imperial Japanese government had recently (1907–1908) tried to monopolize the production of natural camphor as a forest product in Asia but that the monopoly was prevented by the development of the total synthesis alternatives,

=== Taiwan acacia ===
Taiwan acacia (Acacia confusa), also known as Formosan koa and Asian walnut, is a hardwood species native to Taiwan. It is challenging to work and for this reason was traditionally burned as firewood or turned into charcoal. In later years it was exported to China to be made into wood flooring for the American market. At its height Taiwan exported more than 1,000 containers of Taiwan acacia to China. More recently it has been used domestically to produce high value wood products like musical instruments, furniture, and bathtubs.

== Illegal logging ==
Illegal logger are known as shan laoshu, mountain rats, in Taiwan. Illegal logging is a major issue in Taiwan with significant revenue derived from the activity by organized crime and downstream industries. Most illegal loggers are foreign laborers recruited by Taiwanese bosses, and often the laborers do not know they are participating in an illegal activity. Those directing the illegal logging and profiting the most from it are rarely caught because they do not get their hands dirty. Those doing the dirty work of illegal logging face not only the threat of capture and prosecution from the authorities but also the risk of violence from other criminal organizations involved in the illegal wood trade.

In 2020 the Forestry Bureau greatly increased the maximum fines for illegal logging. Illegal logging dropped 80% from 2015 to 2025; the Forestry and Nature Conservation Agency primarily credits this to efforts made in the involvement of tribes in legal and sustainable forest based economic activities.

== Deforestation ==
Deforestation in Taiwan is the changes on the forested area in the island due to economy factors, such as agriculture, urban expansion etc. In 1904–2015, Taiwan has a net annual forest area change rate of 34 km^{2}.

== See also ==
- Taiwan Forestry Research Institute
- Dongshi Forestry Culture Park
- Luodong Forestry Culture Park
- Lintianshan Forestry Culture Park
- Abies kawakamii
