= Forestry and Nature Conservation Agency =

Government agency of the Republic of China

- 農業部林業及自然保育署; Nóngyè Bù Línyè Jí Zìrán Bǎoyù Shǔ

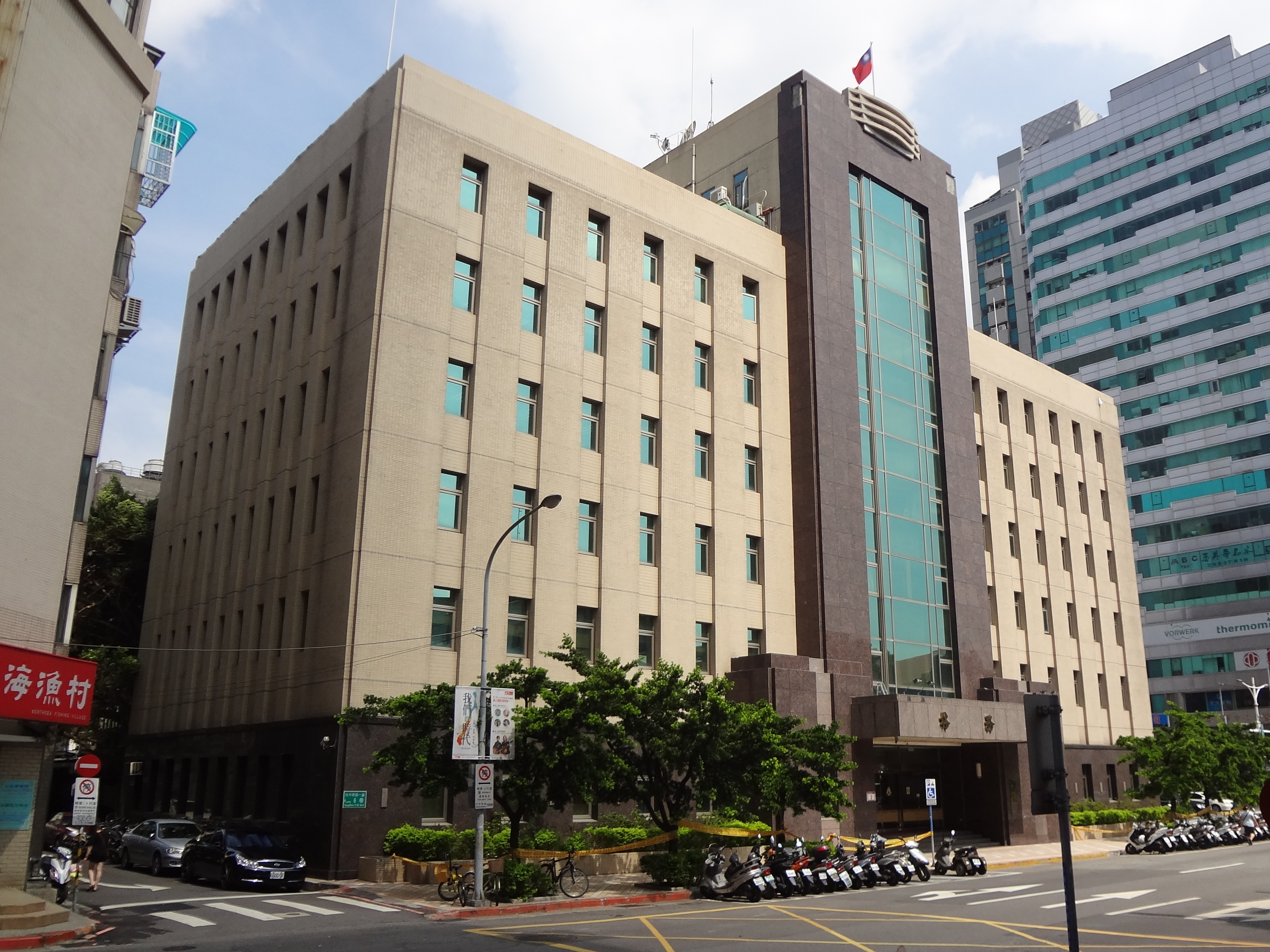

Agency overview
- Formed: 1945; 81 years ago (as Office of Forestry Administration); 15 February 1960; 66 years ago (as Forestry Bureau)
- Jurisdiction: Taiwan
- Headquarters: Zhongzheng, Taipei, Taiwan; 25.043601°N 121.526601°E
- Agency executives: Lin Hwa-ching, Director-General; Liao Yi-kuang, Deputy Director-General
- Parent agency: Ministry of Agriculture
- Website: Official website

The Forestry and Nature Conservation Agency (Chinese: 農業部林業及自然保育署; pinyin: Nóngyè Bù Línyè Jí Zìrán Bǎoyù Shǔ) is an agency of the Ministry of Agriculture of Taiwan (ROC).

== History ==
The Forestry Bureau was originally established in 1945 as the Office of Forestry Administration. In June 1947, the office was disbanded and the Forestry Administration Division was established. The division was then reorganized on 15 February 1960 to form the Forestry Bureau. It was then later renamed as Forestry and Nature Conservation Agency. In 2025 the Forestry and Nature Conservation Agency launched a website to educate the public about illegal logging.

== Organizational structure ==
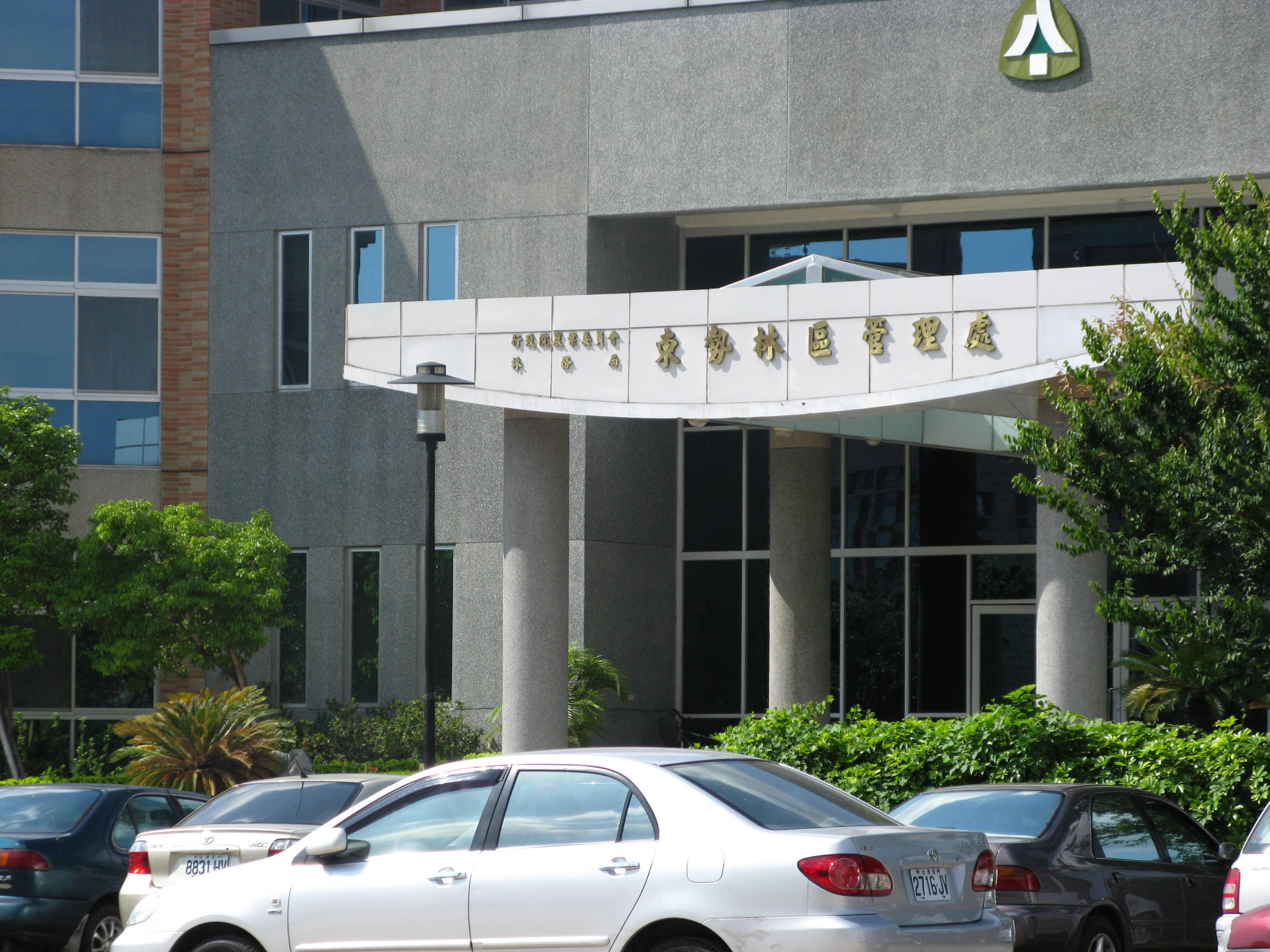
Dongshi Forest District Office

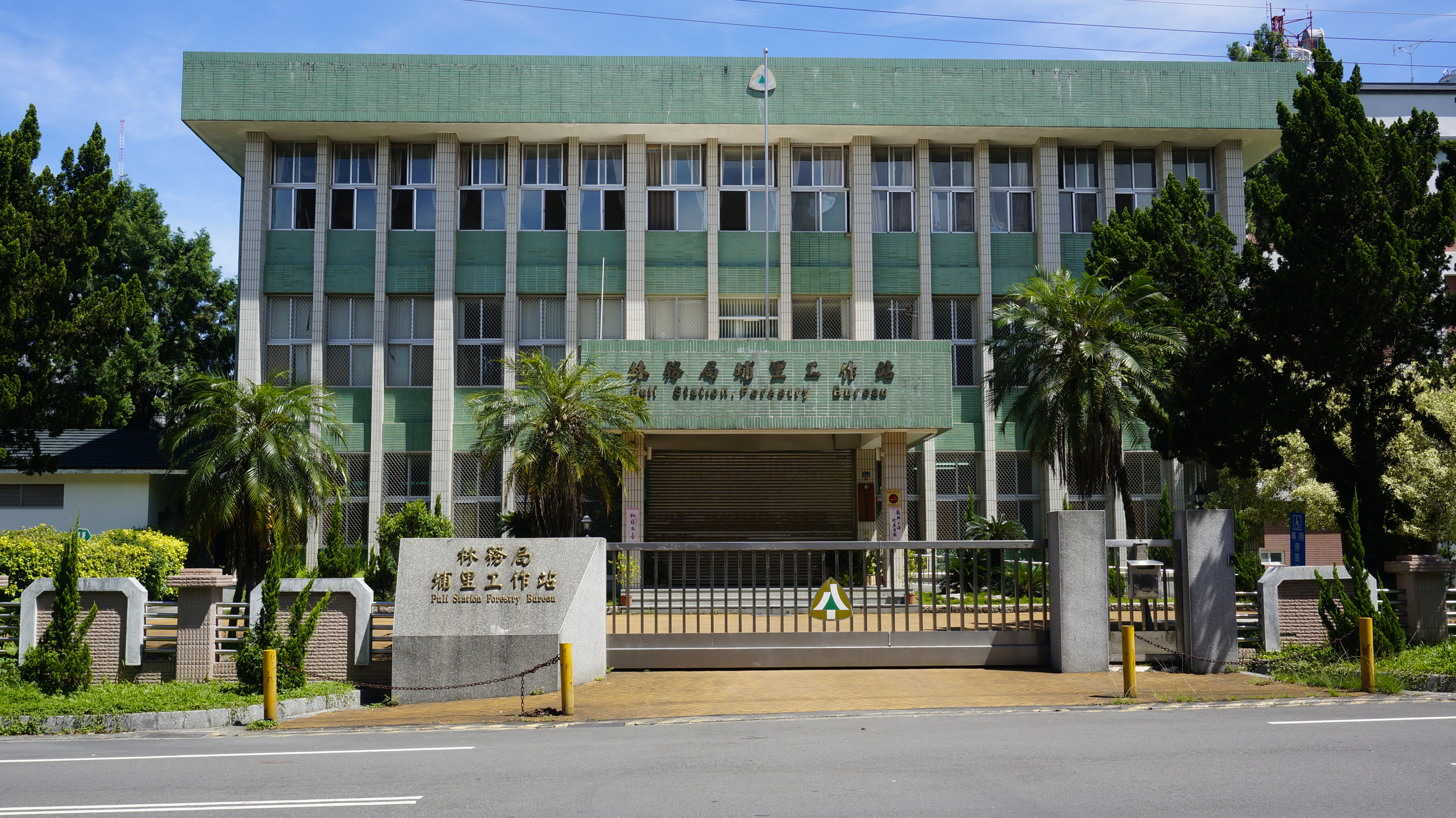
Nantou Forest District Office

=== Operational divisions ===
- Forest Planning Division
- Forest Administration Division
- Watershed Management Division
- Reforestation and Production Division
- Conservation and Recreation Division
- Conservation Division

=== Administrative divisions ===
- Secretariat
- Personnel Office
- Accounting Office
- Civil Service Ethics Office

== Branch offices ==
- Luodong Forest District Office
- Hsinchu Forest District Office
- Dongshi Forest District Office
- Nantou Forest District Office
- Chiayi Forest District Office
- Alishan Forest Railway and Cultural Heritage Office
- Pingtung Forest District Office
- Taitung Forest District Office
- Hualien Forest District Office
- Aerial Survey Office

== Transportation ==
The agency is accessible within walking distance East from Shandao Temple Station of Taipei Metro.

== See also ==
- Council of Agriculture (Taiwan)
- Deforestation in Taiwan
- Forestry in Taiwan
- Tianchi Lodge
- Jiujiu Cabins
