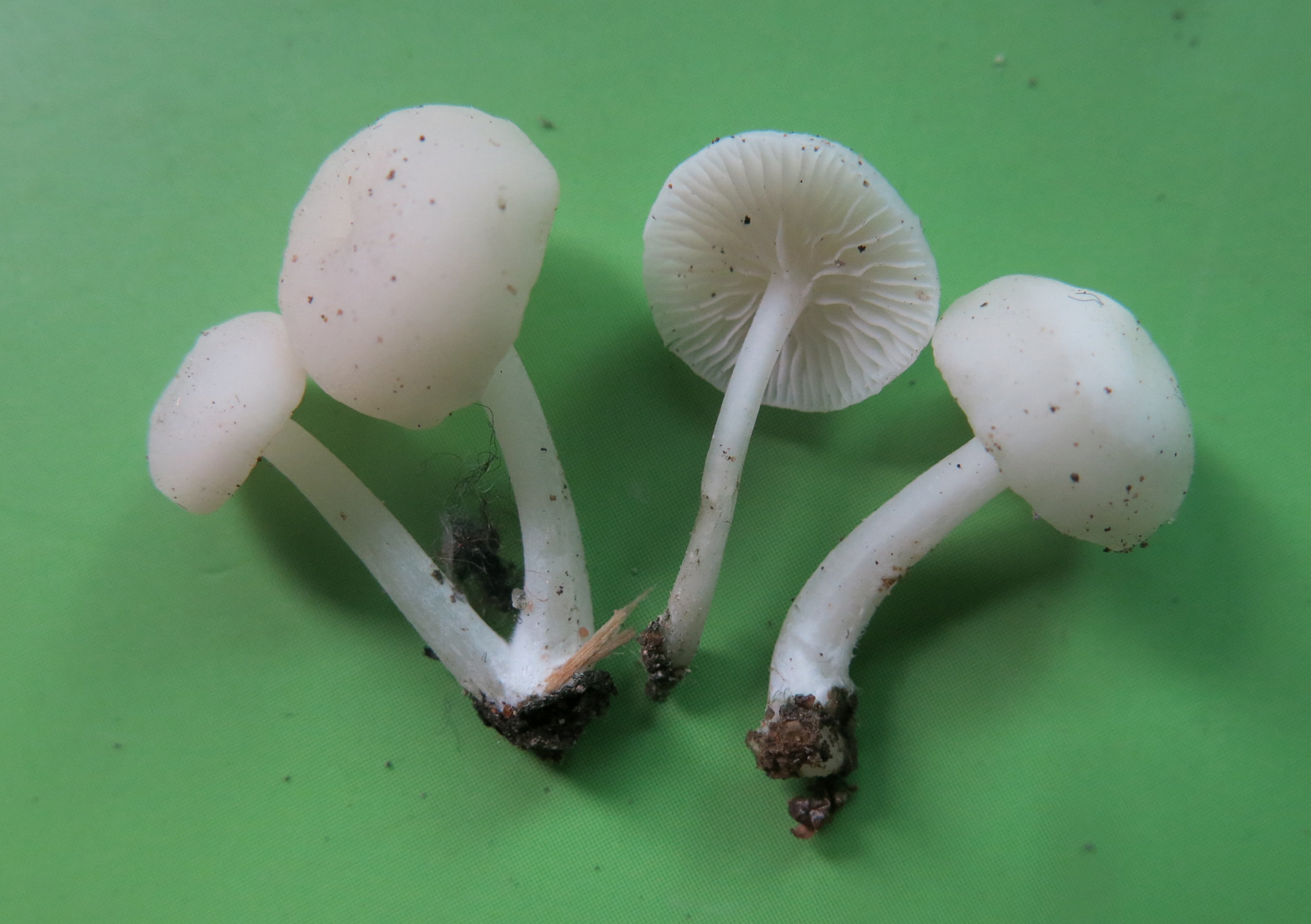
- Lactocollybia subvariicystis from China

Scientific classification
- Kingdom: Fungi
- Division: Basidiomycota
- Class: Agaricomycetes
- Order: Agaricales
- Family: Marasmiaceae
- Genus: Lactocollybia; Singer (1939)

Type species
- Lactocollybia lacrimosa (R.Heim) Singer (1939)

Synonyms
- Bertrandiella R.Heim (1959); Bertrandiella R.Heim (1966)

= Lactocollybia =

Genus of fungi

Lactocollybia is a genus of agaric fungi in the family Marasmiaceae. The widespread genus contains 17 species, many of which are found in tropical areas.

== Species ==
- Lactocollybia aequatorialis
- Lactocollybia albida
- Lactocollybia aurantiaca
- Lactocollybia carneipes
- Lactocollybia cycadicola
- Lactocollybia epia
- Lactocollybia globosa — South Africa
- Lactocollybia gracillima
- Lactocollybia graminicola
- Lactocollybia holophaea
- Lactocollybia ianthina
- Lactocollybia lacrimosa
- Lactocollybia marasmiiformis
- Lactocollybia microspora
- Lactocollybia modesta
- Lactocollybia piliicystis — South Africa
- Lactocollybia variicystis — South Africa
- Lactocollybia subvariicystis — Southern China

== See also ==
- List of Marasmiaceae genera
