= Deforestation in Taiwan =

Conversion of forest to non-forest for human use in Taiwan

Deforestation in Taiwan is the changes on the forested area in the island due to agriculture, urban expansion and other economy factors. In 1904–2015, Taiwan has a net annual forest area change rate of 34 km^{2}.

== History ==
The major changes in forest area of Taiwan are divided into several periods.

=== First period ===
The earliest documented period was the first period in 1904–1950, roughly coincided with the later stage of Japanese rule in Taiwan. In 1926, 64% of Taiwan's land was covered in forest. However, many new agricultural land were created in western lowland of Taiwan.

=== Second period ===
The second period which in 1956–1993, which coincided with the early era of Kuomintang government, saw a sharp increase in built-up area where it consumed forest areas around major big cities and towns. In 1989, the government issued a ban on the logging of primeval forests, and all logging was banned in 1991.

=== Third period ===
The third period in 1995–2015, saw major afforestation made and forested land reached its peak at 67% in 2010. Most of the afforestation were made on former agricultural land. Since 2008, companies, individuals and government bodies have jointly planted more than 230 km^{2} of trees. Following this period the primary challenge facing forests in Taiwan is illegal logging. Illegal logging dropped 80% from 2015 to 2025; the Forestry and Nature Conservation Agency primarily credits this to efforts made in the involvement of tribes in legal and sustainable forest based economic activities.

== See also ==
- Geography of Taiwan
- Forestry in Taiwan
