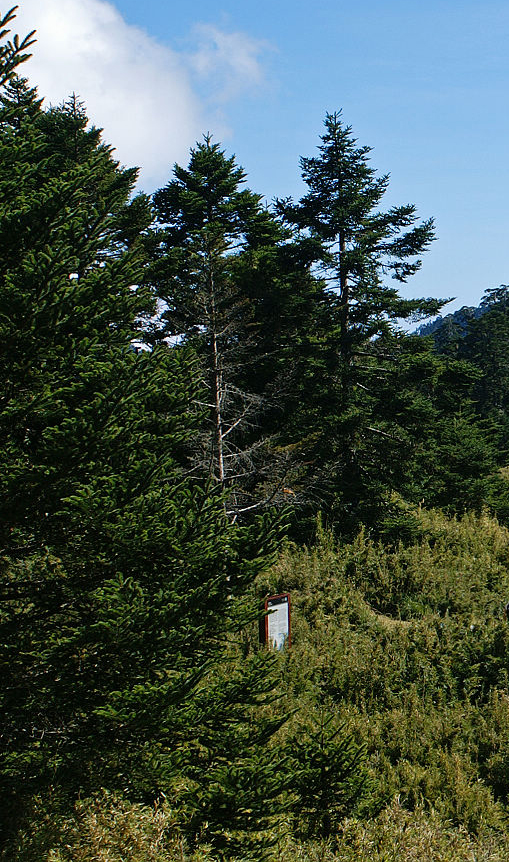

Conservation status
- Near Threatened (IUCN 3.1)

Scientific classification
- Kingdom: Plantae
- Clade: Tracheophytes
- Clade: Gymnospermae
- Division: Pinophyta
- Class: Pinopsida
- Order: Pinales
- Family: Pinaceae
- Genus: Abies
- Species: A. kawakamii

Binomial name
- Abies kawakamii (Hayata) T.Ito

= Abies kawakamii =

Species of conifer

Abies kawakamii is a species of conifer in the family Pinaceae. It is found only in Taiwan. First described in 1908 by Bunzō Hayata as a variety of Abies mariesii, a high-mountain fir native to Japan; the next year it was elevated to species rank by Tokutarô Itô. Abies kawakamii is exclusively native to the island of Taiwan, and is one of the southernmost true firs (together with A. fansipanensis, native to Vietnam, and A. guatemalensis, from Mexico and Guatemala). It is a high-mountain species occurring in northern and central Taiwan at elevations between 2400 and 3800 m in association with other temperate plants, dominantly conifers, including Juniperus formosana var. formosana, Tsuga formosana, and Juniperus morrisonicola.

Taiwan fir is a small to medium-sized tree sometimes reaching a height of 35 m and trunk diameter of 1 m. Initially, the bark is scurfy or scaly, lenticellate, later detaching in elongated plates. The branchlets are yellowish-brown when mature, furrowed, hairy. The needles are 1–2.8 cm long, pruinose, with stoma-lines above and 2 stomatal bands below. It has rather small cones 5–7.5 cm long, cylindrical or conical-cylindrical, dark blue, with included bracts.

Since 2015 it has been protected by law in Taiwan.

== See also ==
- Forestry in Taiwan
