= Tai'an, Miaoli =

Coordinates: 24.422769°N 121.050689°E

Tai'an Township 泰安鄉 Taian
- Mountain indigenous township
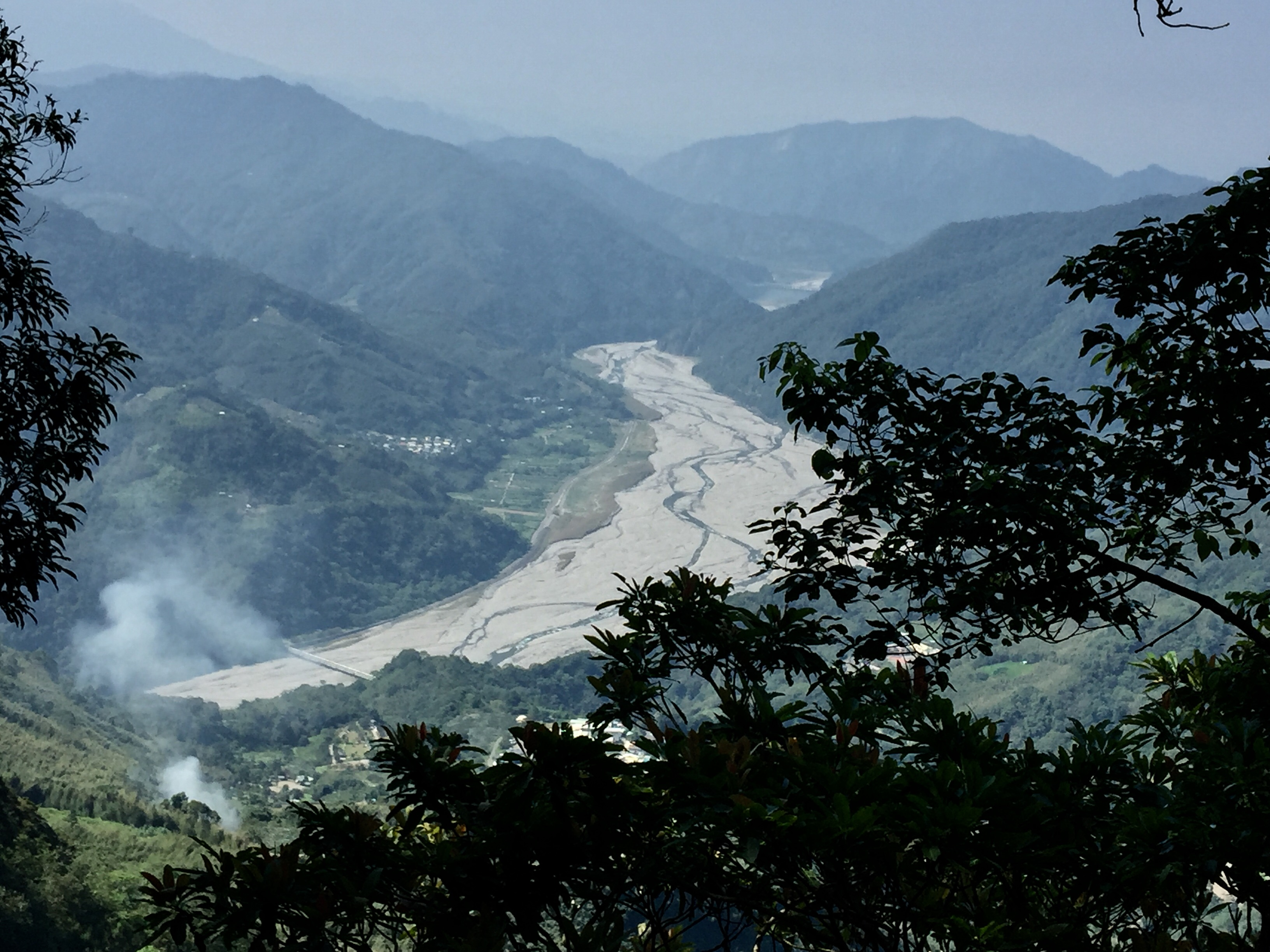
- Da'an River

- Taian Township Office, Miaoli County

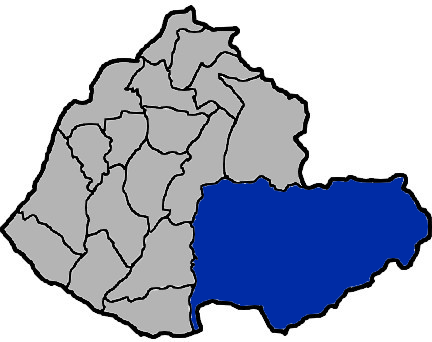
- Tai'an Township in Miaoli County
- Location: Miaoli County, Taiwan

Area
  - Total: 615 km^{2} (237 sq mi)

Population (September 2023)
  - Total: 5,672
  - Density: 9.22/km^{2} (23.9/sq mi)
- Website: www.taian.gov.tw (in Chinese)

Tai'an Township (Chinese: 泰安鄉; pinyin: Tài'ān Xiāng) is a mountain indigenous township in southeastern Miaoli County, Taiwan. It is the largest township and the only mountain indigenous township in Miaoli County.

== Geography ==
Tai'an Township is a mountainous region without convenient transportation both between villages and between Tai'an itself and outside townships. The sources of the Houlong and Da-an rivers are found in the township. More than two thirds of the population consists of the indigenous Atayal people.

- Area: 614.51 square kilometres (237.26 sq mi)
- Population: 5,672 people (September 2023)

== Administrative divisions ==
Administrative divisions of Tai'an Township

The township comprises eight villages: Bagua, Daxing, Jinshui, Meiyuan, Qingan, Shilin, Xiangbi and Zhongxing.

== Politics ==
The township is part of Miaoli County Constituency II electoral district for Legislative Yuan.

== Tourist attractions ==
- Guanwu National Forest Recreation Area
- Shei-Pa National Park
- Tai'an Hot Spring
- Xishuikeng Tofu Street
