= Guanwu National Forest Recreation Area =

Forest in Taiwan

Guanwu National Forest Recreation Area Chinese: 觀霧國家森林遊樂區
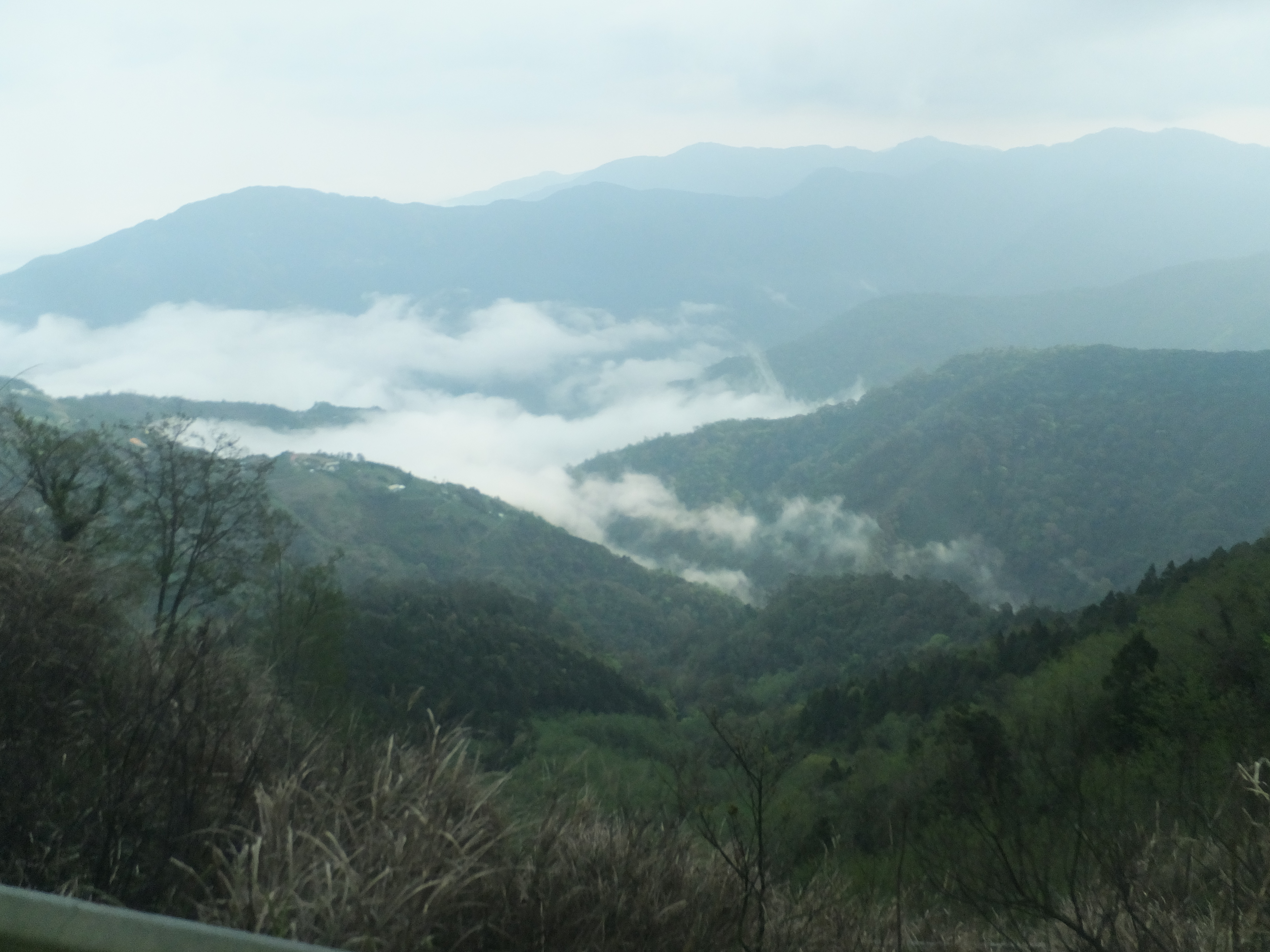

- Location within Taiwan
- Interactive map of Guanwu National Forest Recreation Area

Geography
- Location: Wufeng, Hsinchu County and Tai'an, Miaoli County in Taiwan
- Coordinates: 24°30′22.1″N 121°06′49.8″E
- Elevation: 1,500–2,500 m (4,900–8,200 ft)
- Area: 907 ha (2,240 acres)

Guanwu National Forest Recreation Area (traditional Chinese: 觀霧國家森林遊樂區; simplified Chinese: 观雾国家森林游乐区; pinyin: Guānwù Guójiā Sēnlín Yóulè Qū) is a forest located in Wufeng Township, Hsinchu County and Tai'an Township, Miaoli County in Taiwan.

== Geology ==
The forest spans over an area of 907 hectares (2,240 acres) and is located at an elevation of 1,500–2,500 meters (4,900–8,200 ft). It has an annual mean temperature of 13 °C (55 °F). It has several waterfalls; the 30-meter (98 ft) Guanwu Waterfall is the most notable one.

== See also ==
- Geography of Taiwan
