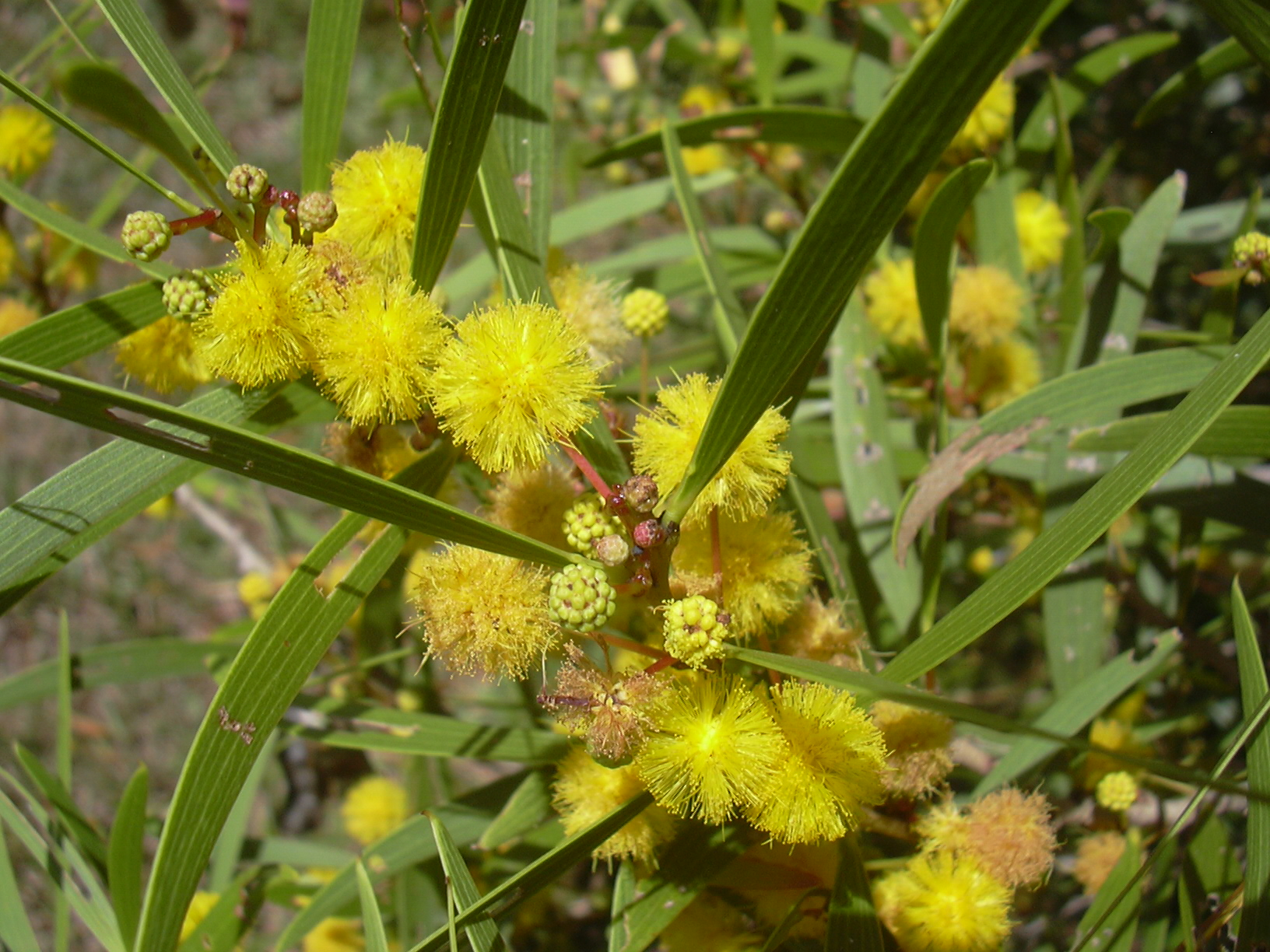

Conservation status
- Least Concern (IUCN 3.1)

Scientific classification
- Kingdom: Plantae
- Clade: Tracheophytes
- Clade: Angiosperms
- Clade: Eudicots
- Clade: Rosids
- Order: Fabales
- Family: Fabaceae
- Subfamily: Caesalpinioideae
- Clade: Mimosoid clade
- Genus: Acacia
- Species: A. confusa

Binomial name
- Acacia confusa Merr.
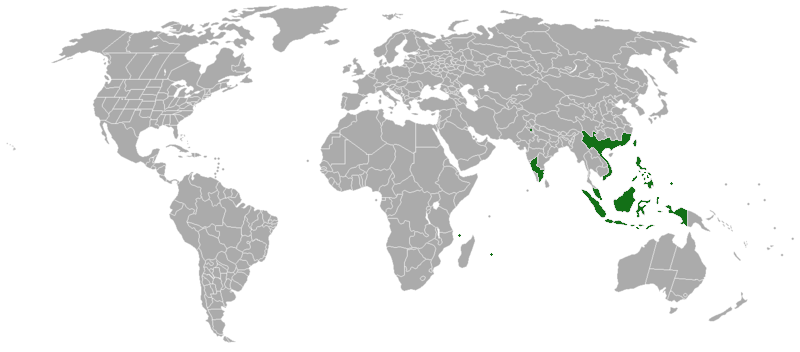
- Modern introduced range of Acacia confusa

Synonyms
- Acacia richii auct. non A. Gray; Racosperma confusum (Merr.) Pedley

= Acacia confusa =

Species of plant

Acacia confusa is a perennial tree native to South-East Asia. Some common names for it are ayangile, small Philippine acacia, Formosa acacia (Taiwan acacia), Philippine Wattle, and Formosan koa. It grows to a height of 15 m. Originally native to southern Taiwan's Hengchun peninsula and the northern islands of the Philippines, the tree has become very common in many tropical Pacific areas, including Hawaii, where the species is considered invasive.

== Uses ==
The wood has a density of about 0.75 g/cm^{3}. In Taiwan, its wood was used to make support beams for underground mines. Acacia confusa is challenging to work and for this reason was traditionally burned as firewood or turned into charcoal in Taiwan. In later years it was exported to China to be made into wood flooring for the American market. At its height Taiwan exported more than 1,000 containers of Taiwan acacia to China. More recently it has been used domestically to produce high value wood products like musical instruments, furniture, and bathtubs.

The wood was culturally significant to the Hakka of Taiwan whose extensive planting of the species greatly increased its range on the island. The range was further increased during the Japanese colonial period as the species' strong and fast-growing roots were utilised to secure disturbed slopes. The plant is also used in traditional medicine and is available from herbal medicine shops in Taiwan, but there has been no clinical study to support its effectiveness.

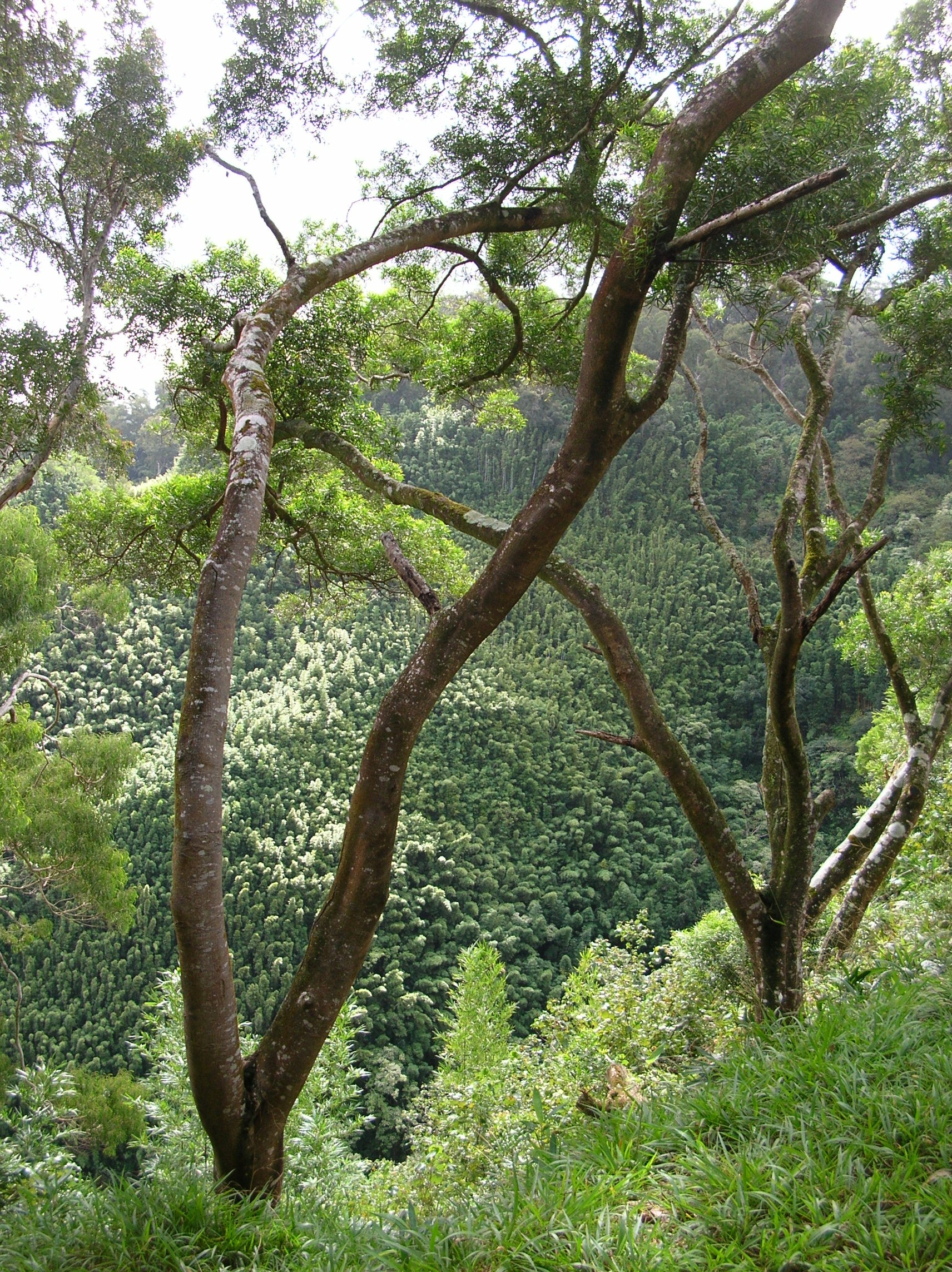
Acacia confusa habitat

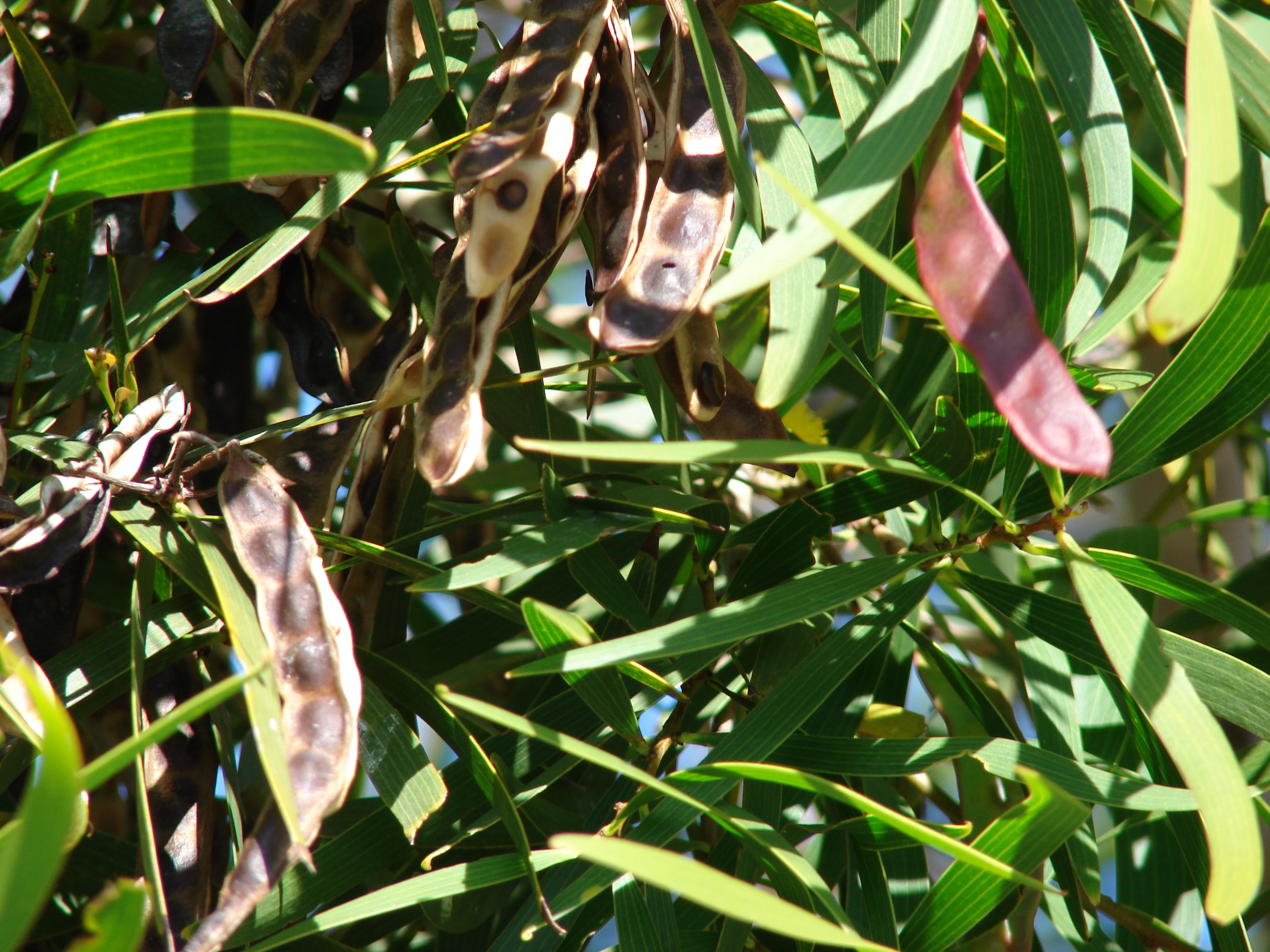
Acacia confusa leaves and pods

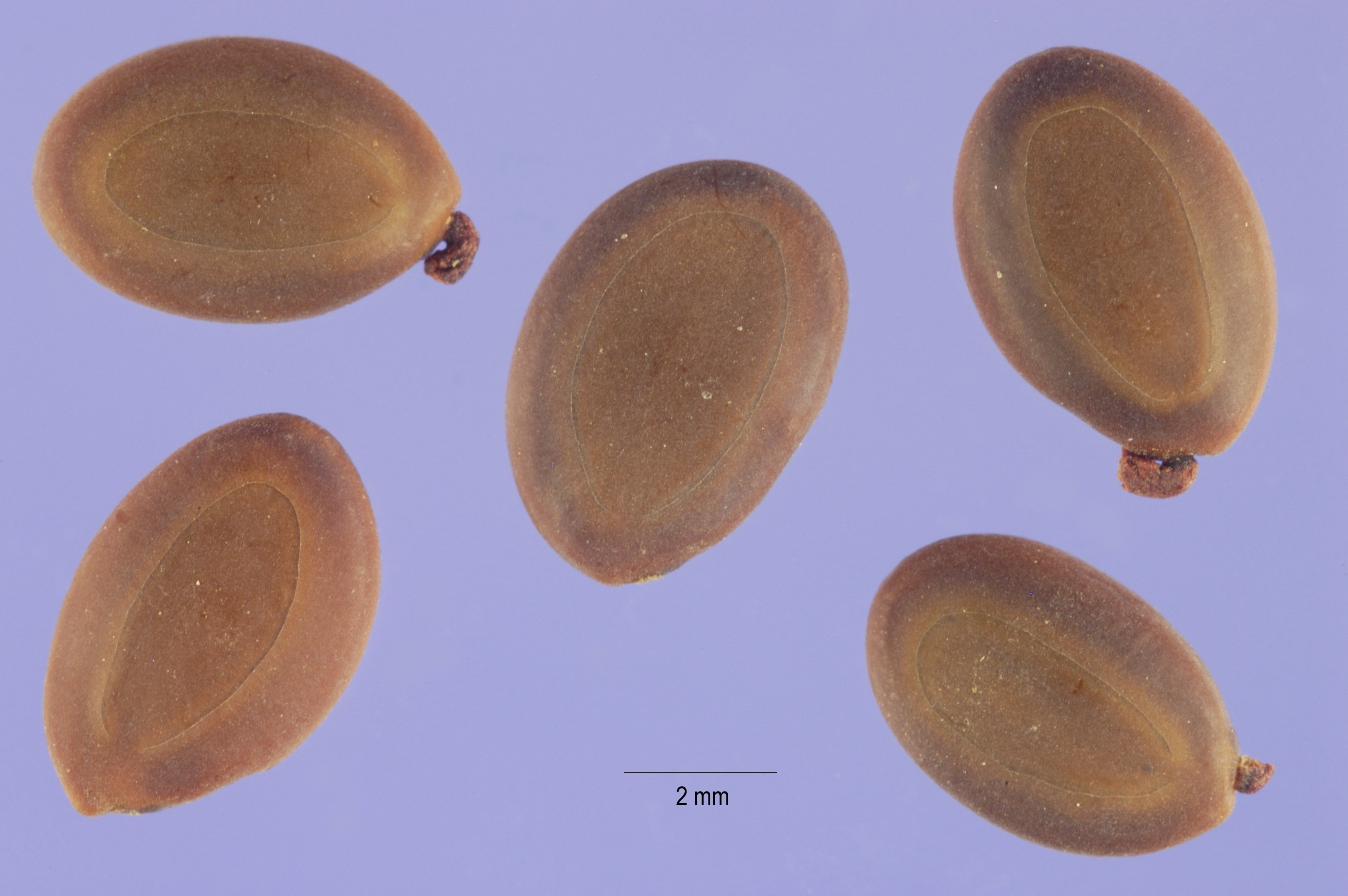
Acacia confusa seeds

== Phytochemicals ==
Phytochemicals found in Acacia confusa:

=== Root bark ===
- N-Methyltryptamine
- N,N-Dimethyltryptamine

=== Seeds ===
- Oxalyldiaminopropionic acid (α-amino-β-oxalylaminopropionic acid), which can cause neurological damage, paralysis, and death.

=== Stems ===
- N-Methyltryptamine, 0.04%

== Varieties ==
- Acacia confusa var. inamurai Hayata

== See also ==
- List of Acacia species
- Flora of the Philippines
- Forestry in Taiwan
