= Mount Xiuguluan =

Mountain in Nantoiu and Hualien, Taiwan

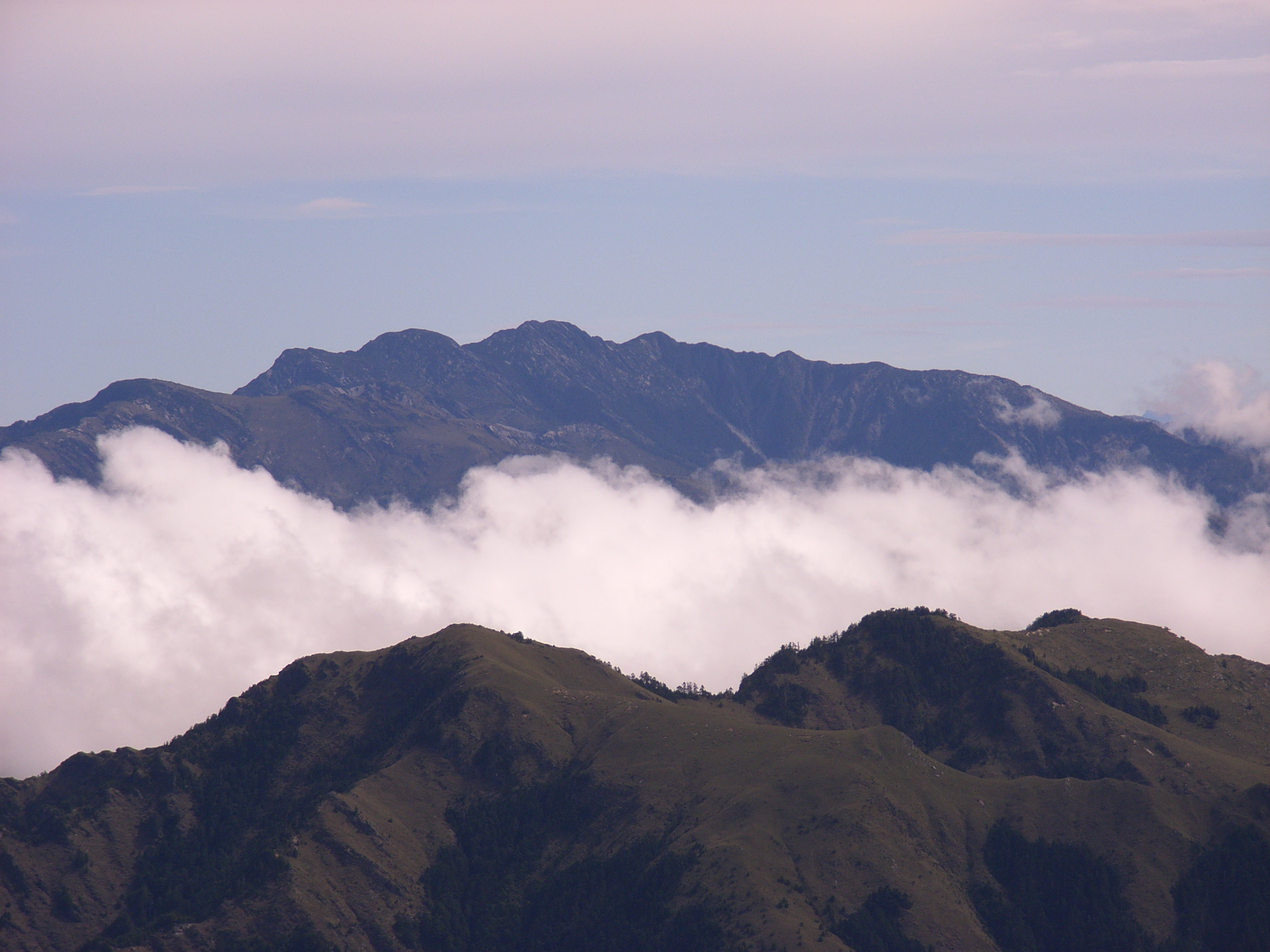
- Xiuguluan Mountain as seen from Xiangyang Mountain ridge

Highest point
- Elevation: 3,825 metres (12,549 ft)
- Prominence: 1,019 m (3,343 ft)
- Listing: 100 Peaks of Taiwan, Ribu
- Coordinates: 23°29′48″N 121°03′27″E

Geography
- Location within Taiwan
- Location: Xinyi, Nantou County/ Zhuoxi, Hualien County, Taiwan
- Parent range: Central Mountain Range

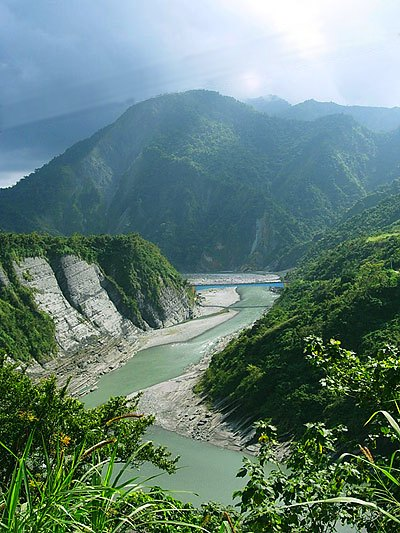
Xiuguluan Mountain and River

Mount Xiuguluan (Chinese: 秀姑巒山; Hanyu Pinyin: Xiùgūluán Shān; Tongyong Pinyin: Siòuguluán Shan; Wade–Giles: Hsiu^{4}-ku^{1}-luan^{2} shan^{1}; Pe̍h-ōe-jī: Siù-ko͘-loân-soaⁿ, Bunun: Mahudas) is a mountain in Taiwan in Yushan National Park with an elevation of 3,825 m. It is located in Hualien County by the Xiuguluan River which has many tributaries such as Fuyuan River, Fengping River, and Lekuleku River, all nearby the river basin. It is the tallest mountain in the Central Mountain Range and the 6th tallest in Taiwan.

== See also ==
- 100 Peaks of Taiwan
- List of mountains in Taiwan
- List of rivers in Taiwan
