= 100 Peaks of Taiwan =

Selection of best hiking peaks

The Baiyue (Chinese: 臺灣百岳; pinyin: Táiwān bǎiyuè) is a list of one hundred mountain peaks in Taiwan. They were chosen by a group of prominent Taiwanese hikers from mountain peaks known at the time to be over 3,000 meters (10,000 feet) in height. (Note: The original criteria of height was 10,000 Japanese feet, or 3,030 meters.) The selection criteria included uniqueness, danger, height, beauty and prominence. Preference was also given to peaks already named and those with triangulation points. As such, "Top" does not refer strictly to the highest peaks by elevation, but rather peaks most worth hiking. The list was intended to promote enthusiasm for high-altitude hiking in Taiwan. In the resulting list of one hundred peaks, 69 peaks were in the Central Mountain Range, the largest of Taiwan's five principal mountain ranges, while 19 were in the Xueshan Range, and 12 were in the Yushan Range. The Alishan Range and Coastal Mountain Range, being below 3,000m, have no peaks in the list of Baiyue.

== History ==
Taiwan has one of the highest densities of tall mountains in the world. To promote mountain hiking, the Taiwan Alpine Association began developing a list of top 100 peaks for Taiwan. Lin Wen-an, after a 1971 crossing of the Central Mountain Range, set about drawing up the list. Significant contributions in sourcing photos and materials were made by the following: Ruan Rongzhu, Winston Shieh, Yang Zhang Bilian, and the Chinese Mountain Association. After extensive consultation with Ching-Chang Tsai, Tian-Cheng Hsing, Tung-San Ting and other prominent hikers of the day, the list of Baiyue was finalized.

Upon completion of the list, hiking the Baiyue immediately became one of the primary goals of avid hikers in Taiwan. Finishing the Baiyue is no easy task, however. For aspiring Baiyue hikers, the Five Greats, Three Spires, and One Ogre (Hanzi: 五嶽三尖一奇), whose unique beauty best represents the grandeur of Taiwan's high mountains, became a popular starting point. Other popular sets of peaks include the Harsh Ten and Four Beauties (Hanzi: 十峻四秀). Many begin with the more easily accessible peaks in the Hehuanshan area.

There are actually over 260 mountain peaks over 3,000 meters (10,000 feet) in Taiwan, many of which were not listed in the Baiyue, but nonetheless impressive. Therefore, some criticism remains over the inclusion of certain mountain peaks on the list, and the exclusion of others, such as Chushan in the Dongjunshan Chain, and Mutelebushan near Xueshan's North Peak. Some have argued that these peaks should be in the Baiyue, while peaks such as Jupenshan, Lushan, Nanhubeishan, Shenmazhenshan, Jianshan, and Bulakesangshan, should be taken off the list. Also, when resurveying was carried out long after the Baiyue list was completed, it was found that Liushunshan and Lushan were under 3,000m. However, as the Baiyue already enjoyed such widespread acceptance, they were not removed from the list and remain there to this day.

=== 100 Minor Peaks of Taiwan ===
Later, a separate list of 100 smaller peaks lower in altitude and closer to urban areas (Chinese: 郊山) was published by the Executive Yuan Sports Affairs Council in 2003, suitable for people of all physical abilities, to encourage more people to connect with nature.

== Complete listing of Baiyue ==
The following is a complete listing of the 100 Taiwanese mountain peaks commonly known as the Baiyue:

| # | Mountain Peak | Elevation | Difficulty | Location | National park | Listing | Picture |
|---|---|---|---|---|---|---|---|
| 1 | Yushan (Note: Formerly known as Niitakayama, Mt. Morrison; This mountain is the highest point of Nantou County, Kaohsiung City, Chiayi County.) (玉山) | 3952 m 12966 ft | A | Nantou County, Kaohsiung City, Chiayi County | Yushan | Five Greats #1 (Note: The Five Greats (五嶽) are the highest in their region, and they include famous mountains such as Yushan and Xueshan. They are a must for all Baiyue hikers.); Three Highs #1 (Note: During the Japanese rule in Taiwan, the Three Highs (三高) had the character of "high" (Kanji: 高) in their names, which are rarely used today.) | |
| 2 | Xueshan (Note: Formerly known as Tsugitakayama, Mt. Sylvia; Highest point of Miaoli County, Taichung City.) (雪山) | 3886 m 12749 ft | A | Miaoli County, Taichung City | Shei-Pa | Five Greats #2; Three Highs #2 | |
| 3 | Yushan East Peak (玉山東峰) | 3869 m 12694 ft | C+ | Nantou County, Kaohsiung City | Yushan | Harsh Ten #1 (Note: The Harsh Ten (十峻) are prominent, steep peaks not included in the Five Greats, Three Spires, and One Ogre.) | |
| 4 | Yushan North Peak (玉山北峰) | 3858 m 12657 ft | B | Nantou County | Yushan | Eight Beauties #1 (Note: The Eight Beauties (八秀) were chosen for their beautiful landscapes, gentle slope, meadows of short bamboo and lack of rock scrambling.) | |
| 5 | Yushan South Peak (玉山南峰) | 3844 m 12612 ft | C+ | Kaohsiung City | Yushan | Harsh Ten #2 | |
| 6 | Xiuguluanshan (Note: Other names: Mahudas Shan, the highest point of Central Mountain Range) (秀姑巒山) | 3825 m 12549 ft | B | Hualien County, Nantou County | Yushan | Five Greats #3 | |
| 7 | Mabolasishan (Note: Other names: Ulamun Shan, the 2nd highest point of Central Mountain Range) (馬博拉斯山) | 3785 m 12418 ft | C+ | Hualien County, Nantou County | Yushan | Harsh Ten #3 | |
| 8 | Nanhudashan (南湖大山) | 3742 m 12277 ft | B | Taichung City | Taroko | Five Greats #4 | |
| 9 | Dongxiaonanshan (東小南山) | 3711 m 12175 ft | C | Kaohsiung City | Yushan | Flat Nine #1 (Note: The Flat Nine (九平) are wide, flat peaks without large rocks or trees, only short bamboo. Comfortable, easy walking.) | |
| 10 | Central Range Point (中央尖山) | 3705 m 12156 ft | C+ | Taichung City, Hualien County | Taroko | Three Spires #1 (Note: The Three Spires (三尖) are famous for their beauty and conical shape, and have character "Spire" (尖) in their names.) | |
| 11 | Xueshan North Peak (Note: Other names: Yuliyulishan) (雪山北峰) | 3703 m 12149 ft | C+ | Miaoli County, Taichung City | Shei-Pa | Gentle Ten #2 (Note: The Gentle Ten (十潤) have an overall smooth profile, with gentle slopes and little climbing or scrambling needed.) | |
| 12 | Guanshan (Note: Highest point of Taitung County) (關山) | 3668 m 12034 ft | C | Taitung County, Kaohsiung City | Yushan | Harsh Ten #4 | |
| 13 | Dashuikushan (大水堀山) | 3642 m 11949 ft | B | Hualien County, Nantou County | Yushan | Gentle Ten #1 | |
| 14 | Nanhushan East Peak (Note: Highest point of Yilan County) (南湖大山東峰) | 3632 m 11916 ft | B | Taichung City, Hualien County, Yilan County | Taroko | Rocky Ten #1 (Note: The Rocky Ten (十巖) have rocky peaks that require scrambling or climbing to summit.) | |
| 15 | Dongjundashan (Note: Other names: Kayixishan) (東郡大山) | 3619 m 11873 ft | C+ | Nantou County | | Majestic Ten #1 (Note: The Majestic Ten (十崇) were chosen for their size and prominence, wide peaks, gentle slope and serene nature.) | |
| 16 | Qilaishan North Peak (奇萊山北峰) | 3607 m 11834 ft | B | Hualien County | Taroko | Harsh Ten #5; One Ogre (Note: Qilaishan North Peak, the One Ogre (一奇 or 一怪), is located along the northern end of the Central Mountain Range's central spine. The ascent is steep and difficult in parts, and the dark fragmented slate covering the western face has earned it the nickname "Black Qilai". Some sources spell Qilai "Chilai".) | |
| 17 | Xiangyangshan (Note: Other names: Hongyeshan) (向陽山) | 3603 m 11821 ft | A | Kaohsiung City, Taitung County | Yushan | Eight Beauties #2 | |
| 18 | Dajianshan (Note: Other names: Baduowanuominshan)(大劍山) | 3594 m 11791 ft | B | Taichung City | Shei-Pa | Harsh Ten #6 | |
| 19 | Yunfeng (Note: Other names: Cloud Peak) (雲峰) | 3564 m 11693 ft | C | Kaohsiung City | Yushan | Lofty Nine #1 (Note: The Lofty Nine (九峨) are tall conspicuous peaks, catching the eye more than neighboring peaks.) | |
| 20 | Qilaishan (Note: Other names: Qilaishan Main Peak) (奇萊山) | 3560 m 11680 ft | B | Hualien County, Nantou County | Taroko | Lofty Nine #2 | |
| 21 | Malijiananshan (Note: Other names: Tabilashan) (馬利加南山) | 3546 m 11634 ft | C+ | Nantou County, Hualien County | Yushan | Rocky Ten #2 | |
| 22 | Nanhubeishan (Note: Other names: Bayoushan) (南湖北山) | 3536 m 11601 ft | B | Yilan County, Taichung City | Taroko | Majestic Ten #2 | |
| 23 | Daxueshan (大雪山) | 3530 m 11581 ft | C | Miaoli County, Taichung City | Shei-Pa | Majestic Ten #3 | |
| 24 | Pintianshan (Note: Other names: Boqinxilunshan)(品田山) | 3524 m 11562 ft | B | Hsinchu County, Taichung City | Shei-Pa | Harsh Ten #7; Four Beauties #1 (Note: The Four Beauties are also known as the Wuling Sixiu due to their proximity to Wuling Farm. Each of these four peaks has its own unique characteristics. The "Four Beauties" initially chosen by Tian-Cheng Hsing were Chiyoushan, Taoshan, Shilunshan and Kalayeshan, while Pintianshan was listed as one of the Harsh Ten. However, since Shilunshan was not a Baiyue, hikers began recognizing Pintianshan as one of the Four Beauties instead.) | |
| 25 | Yushan West Peak (Note: Other names: Tiancuifeng) (玉山西峰) | 3518 m 11542 ft | A | Chiayi County, Nantou County | Yushan | Verdant Ten #4 (Note: The Verdant Ten have trails that wind through lush green forests of tall, twisting trees and bamboo.) | |
| 26 | Touyingshan (頭鷹山) | 3510 m 11516 ft | C | Taichung City, Miaoli County | Shei-Pa | Lofty Nine #3 | |
| 27 | Sanchashan (Note: Other names: Xiaxueshashan) (三叉山) | 3496 m 11470 ft | A | Hualien County, Taitung County, Kaohsiung City | Yushan | Majestic Ten #3 | |
| 28 | Dabajianshan (Note: Other names: Jiutongshan; Highest point of Hsinchu County) (大霸尖山) | 3492 m 11457 ft | A | Hsinchu County, Miaoli County | Shei-Pa | Three Spires #2 | |
| 29 | Nanhushan South Peak (南湖大山南峰) | 3475 m 11401 ft | C | Taichung City, Hualien County | Taroko | Rocky Ten #5 | |
| 30 | Dongluandashan (東巒大山) | 3468 m 11378 ft | C+ | Nantou County | | Eight Beauties #3 | |
| 31 | Wumingshan (Note: Other names: Qusheshan, Gaotianshan) (無明山) | 3451 m 11322 ft | C+ | Taichung City, Hualien County | Taroko | Harsh Ten #8 | |
| 32 | Babashan (Note: Other names: Nanhunanshan) (巴巴山) | 3449 m 11316 ft | C | Taichung City, Hualien County | Taroko | Little Eight #1 (Note: The Little Eight are small peaks with gentle slopes that can be easily reached as part of a longer trip.) | |
| 33 | Maxishan (Note: Other names: Lagashan, Bainanshan) (馬西山) | 3443 m 11296 ft | C+ | Hualien County | Yushan | Majestic Ten #5 | |
| 34 | Hehuanshan North Peak (合歡山北峰) | 3422 m 11227 ft | A | Nantou County, Hualien County | Taroko | Majestic Ten #6 | |
| 35 | Hehuanshan East Peak (合歡山東峰) | 3421 m 11224 ft | A | Nantou County, Hualien County | Taroko | Lofty Nine #4 | |
| 36 | Xiaobajianshan (小霸尖山) | 3418 m 11214 ft | B | Miaoli County | Shei-Pa | Craggy Eight #2 (Note: The Craggy Eight (八銳) jut out from the surrounding terrain and are surrounded by cliffs and difficult terrain.) | |
| 37 | Hehuanshan Main Peak (合歡山主峰) | 3417 m 11211 ft | A | Nantou County | Taroko | Gentle Ten #3 | |
| 38 | South Yushan (南玉山) | 3383 m 11099 ft | C | Kaohsiung City | Yushan | Gentle Ten #4 | |
| 39 | Bilushan (Note: Other names: Lagashan) (畢綠山) | 3371 m 11060 ft | A | Hualien County, Nantou County | Taroko | Narrow Eight #3 (Note: The Narrow Eight have long narrow ridgelines with cliffs or steep slopes on both sides.) | |
| 40 | Zhuoshedashan (桌社大山) | 3369 m 11053 ft | C | Nantou County | | Lofty Nine #5 | |
| 41 | Qilaishan South Peak (奇萊山南峰) | 3358 m 11017 ft | A | Nantou County | | Majestic Ten #7 | |
| 42 | Nanshuangtoushan (南雙頭山) | 3356 m 11010 ft | C | Hualien County, Kaohsiung City | Yushan | Lofty Nine #6 | |
| 43 | Nenggaoshan South Peak (能高山南峰) | 3349 m 10988 ft | C | Nantou County, Hualien County | | Harsh Ten #9 | |
| 44 | Zhijiayangdashan (佳陽山) | 3345 m 10974 ft | A | Taichung City | Shei-Pa | Eight Beauties #4 | |
| 45 | Baigudashan (Note: Other names: Baigoudashan) (白姑大山) | 3342 m 10965 ft | B | Nantou County, Taichung City | | Verdant Ten #7 | |
| 46 | Batongguanshan (八通關山) | 3335 m 10942 ft | A | Nantou County | Yushan | Craggy Eight #3 | |
| 47 | Xinkangshan (Note: Other names: Xinguanshan) (新康山) | 3331 m 10928 ft | C | Hualien County | Yushan | Harsh Ten #10 | |
| 48 | Dandashan (丹大山) | 3325 m 10909 ft | C | Nantou County, Hualien County | | Nine Walls #3 (Note: These mountains rise up like a wall, wide and flat, blocking the view of a large area like a screen.) | |
| 49 | Taoshan (桃山) | 3325 m 10909 ft | A | Hsinchu County, Taichung City | Shei-Pa | Eight Beauties #5; Four Beauties #2 | |
| 50 | Jiayangshan (Note: Other names: Adubanshan) (佳陽山) | 3314 m 10873 ft | B | Taichung City | Shei-Pa | Craggy Eight #4 | |
| 51 | Huoshishan (火石山) | 3310 m 10860 ft | C | Miaoli County, Taichung City | Shei-Pa | Craggy Eight #5 | |
| 52 | Chiyoushan (Note: Other names: Yuluofushan) (池有山) | 3303 m 10837 ft | A | Hsinchu County, Taichung City | Shei-Pa | Simple Six #1 (Note: The Simple Six trails are offshoots from another main trail, short in distance and not very strenuous. They are easy side trips when hiking the parent trail.); Four Beauties #3 | |
| 53 | Yizeshan (Note: Other names: Jiangzeshan) (伊澤山) | 3297 m 10817 ft | A | Miaoli County, Hsinchu County | Shei-Pa | Simple Six #2 | |
| 54 | Beinanzhushan (卑南主山) | 3295 m 10810 ft | C | Kaohsiung City, Taitung County | | Majestic Ten #8 | |
| 55 | Ganzhuowanshan (干卓萬山) | 3284 m 10774 ft | C | Nantou County | | Narrow Eight #4 | |
| 56 | Taroko Mountain (太魯閣大山) | 3283 m 10771 ft | C+ | Hualien County | Taroko | Majestic Ten #9 | |
| 57 | Lulushan (Note: Other names: Majiangzhizishan) (轆轆山) | 3279 m 10758 ft | C | Kaohsiung City | Yushan | Craggy Eight #7 | |
| 58 | Kaxipananshan (喀西帕南山) | 3276 m 10748 ft | C+ | Hualien County | Yushan | Remote Nine #4 (Note: The Remote Nine are on distant offshoots of their mountain range and are not easily combined with other peaks into a single journey.) | |
| 59 | Neilingershan (內嶺爾山) | 3275 m 10745 ft | C | Hualien County | | Majestic Ten #10 | |
| 60 | Lingmingshan (鈴鳴山) | 3272 m 10735 ft | B | Taichung City, Hualien County | Taroko | Eight Beauties #6 | |
| 61 | Jundashan (郡大山) | 3265 m 10712 ft | A | Nantou County | Yushan | Eight Beauties #7 | |
| 62 | Nenggaoshan (Note: Formerly known as: Noutakayama) (能高山) | 3262 m 10702 ft | C | Nantou County, Hualien County | | Lofty Nine #7; Three Highs #3 | |
| 63 | Wandongshan West Peak (Note: Other names: Huoshan) (萬東山西峰) | 3258 m 10689 ft | C | Nantou County | | Remote Nine #5 | |
| 64 | Jianshan (Note: Other names: Xiaojianshan) (劍山) | 3253 m 10673 ft | C | Taichung City | Shei-Pa | Nine Walls #5 | |
| 65 | Pingfengshan (屏風山) | 3250 m 10663 ft | B | Hualien County | Taroko | Nine Walls #6 | |
| 66 | Xiaoguanshan (小關山) | 3249 m 10659 ft | C | Kaohsiung City, Taitung County | | Lofty Nine #8 | |
| 67 | Yixiqingmazhishan (義西請馬至山) | 3245 m 10646 ft | C+ | Hualien County, Nantou County | | Steep Seven #4 (Note: Steep mountains with cliffs and loose rocks.) | |
| 68 | Mushan (Note: Other names: Ganzhuowanshan Southeast Peak) (牧山) | 3241 m 10633 ft | C | Nantou County | | Simple Six #5 | |
| 69 | Yushan Front Peak (玉山前鋒) | 3239 m 10627 ft | A | Chiayi County, Nantou County | Yushan | Simple Six #5 | |
| 70 | Shimenshan (石門山) | 3237 m 10620 ft | A | Hualien County, Nantou County | Taroko | Little Eight #2 | |
| 71 | Wushuangshan (Note: Other names: Maxirouganshan) (無雙山) | 3231 m 10600 ft | C+ | Nantou County | | Nine Walls #7 | |
| 72 | Taguanshan (Note: Other names: Daguanshan) (塔關山) | 3222 m 10571 ft | A | Taitung County, Kaohsiung City | Yushan | Steep Seven #5 | |
| 73 | Mabishanshan (Note: Other names: Mameishan) (馬比杉山) | 3211 m 10535 ft | C | Yilan County, Hualien County | Taroko | Flat Nine #7 | |
| 74 | Dafenjianshan (Note: Other names: Jianshan) (達芬尖山) | 3208 m 10525 ft | C | Nantou County, Kaohsiung City, Hualien County | Yushan | Three Spires #3 | |
| 75 | Xueshan East Peak (Note: Other names: Mingjianshan) (雪山東峰) | 3201 m 10502 ft | A | Taichung City | Shei-Pa | Little Eight #3 | |
| 76 | Nanhuashan (Note: Other names: Nenggaoshan North Peak) (南華山) | 3184 m 10446 ft | A | Nantou County, Hualien County | | Narrow Eight #6 | |
| 77 | Guanshanlingshan (關山嶺山) | 3176 m 10420 ft | A | Taitung County, Kaohsiung City | Yushan | Narrow Eight #7 | |
| 78 | Hainuonanshan (海諾南山) | 3174 m 10413 ft | C | Taitung County, Kaohsiung City | | Gentle Ten #6 | |
| 79 | Zhongxueshan (中雪山) | 3173 m 10410 ft | A | Miaoli County | Shei-Pa | Verdant Ten #8 | |
| 80 | Shuanshan (閂山) | 3168 m 10394 ft | A | Taichung City | Taroko | Eight Beauties #8 | |
| 81 | Ganshufeng (甘薯峰) (Note: Other names: Central Range Point, Yam Peak) | 3158 m 10361 ft | C+ | Hualien County, Taichung City | Taroko | Little Eight #6 | |
| 82 | Hehuanshan West Peak (西合歡山) | 3145 m 10318 ft | A | Nantou County | Taroko | Verdant Ten #9 | |
| 83 | Shenmazhenshan (審馬陣山) (Note: Other names: Yezhenjialuosuishan) | 3141 m 10305 ft | A | Yilan County, Taichung City | Taroko | Contiguous Six #1 (Note: The Contiguous Six (六肩稜) are near other high peaks, and can be reached along a ridge that extends down from the higher peak. They have fairly level trails, the peaks are named and there is some sort of survey marker.) | |
| 84 | Kalayeshan (喀拉業山) (Note: Other names: Jialiupingshan) | 3133 m 10279 ft | A | Hsinchu County, Yilan County | Shei-Pa | Contiguous Six #2; Four Beauties #4 | |
| 85 | Kuhanuoxinshan (庫哈諾辛山) | 3115 m 10220 ft | A | Kaohsiung City | Yushan | Remote Nine #8 | |
| 86 | Jialishan (加利山) (Note: Other names: Maibalabianshan) | 3112 m 10210 ft | A | Miaoli County | Shei-Pa | Contiguous Six #3 | |
| 87 | Baishishan (白石山) | 3110 m 10203 ft | C | Nantou County, Hualien County | | Steep Seven #6 | |
| 88 | Panshishan (磐石山) (Note: Other names: Shanyuanshan) | 3106 m 10190 ft | C | Hualien County | Taroko | Remote Nine #9 | |
| 89 | Patuolushan (帕托魯山) | 3101 m 10174 ft | C | Hualien County | Taroko | Gentle Ten #8 | |
| 90 | Beidawushan (Note: Other names: Dawushan; Highest point in Pingtung County) (北大武山) | 3092 m 10144 ft | A | Pingtung County, Taitung County | | Five Greats #5 | |
| 91 | Xiluandashan (Note: Other names: Luandashan) (西巒大山) | 3081 m 10108 ft | A | Nantou County | | Steep Seven #7 | |
| 92 | Tafenshan (塔芬山) | 3070 m 10072 ft | C | Hualien County, Kaohsiung City | Yushan | Craggy Eight #8 | |
| 93 | Liwuzhushan (立霧主山) (Note: Other names: Tatsukiri Shan) | 3069 m 10069 ft | C | Hualien County | Taroko | Rocky Ten #9 | |
| 94 | Andongjunshan (安東軍山) (Note: Other names: Andongjunshan) | 3068 m 10066 ft | C | Hualien County, Nantou County | | Gentle Ten #9 | |
| 95 | Guangtoushan (光頭山) (Note: Other names: Zhiyaganshan) | 3060 m 10039 ft | C | Nantou County, Hualien County | | Flat Nine #8 | |
| 96 | Yangtoushan (羊頭山) | 3035 m 9957 ft | A | Hualien County | Taroko | Narrow Eight #8 | |
| 97 | Bulakesangshan (布拉克桑山) (Note: Other names: Wulagusanshan) | 3026 m 9928 ft | C | Taitung County, Hualien County | | Nine Walls #9 | |
| 98 | Jupenshan (駒盆山) (Note: Other names: Penjushan, Umabungu Shan) | 3022 m 9915 ft | C+ | Nantou County | Yushan | Contiguous Six #4 | |
| 99 | Liushunshan (六順山) | 2999 m 9839 ft | B | Nantou County, Hualien County | | Flat Nine #9 | |
| 100 | Lushan (鹿山) | 2981 m 9780 ft | C | Kaohsiung City | Yushan | Contiguous Six #6 | |

== See also ==
- 100 Minor Peaks of Taiwan
