= Chang Yuan-chih =

Taiwanese climber (1988–2024)

- 張元植
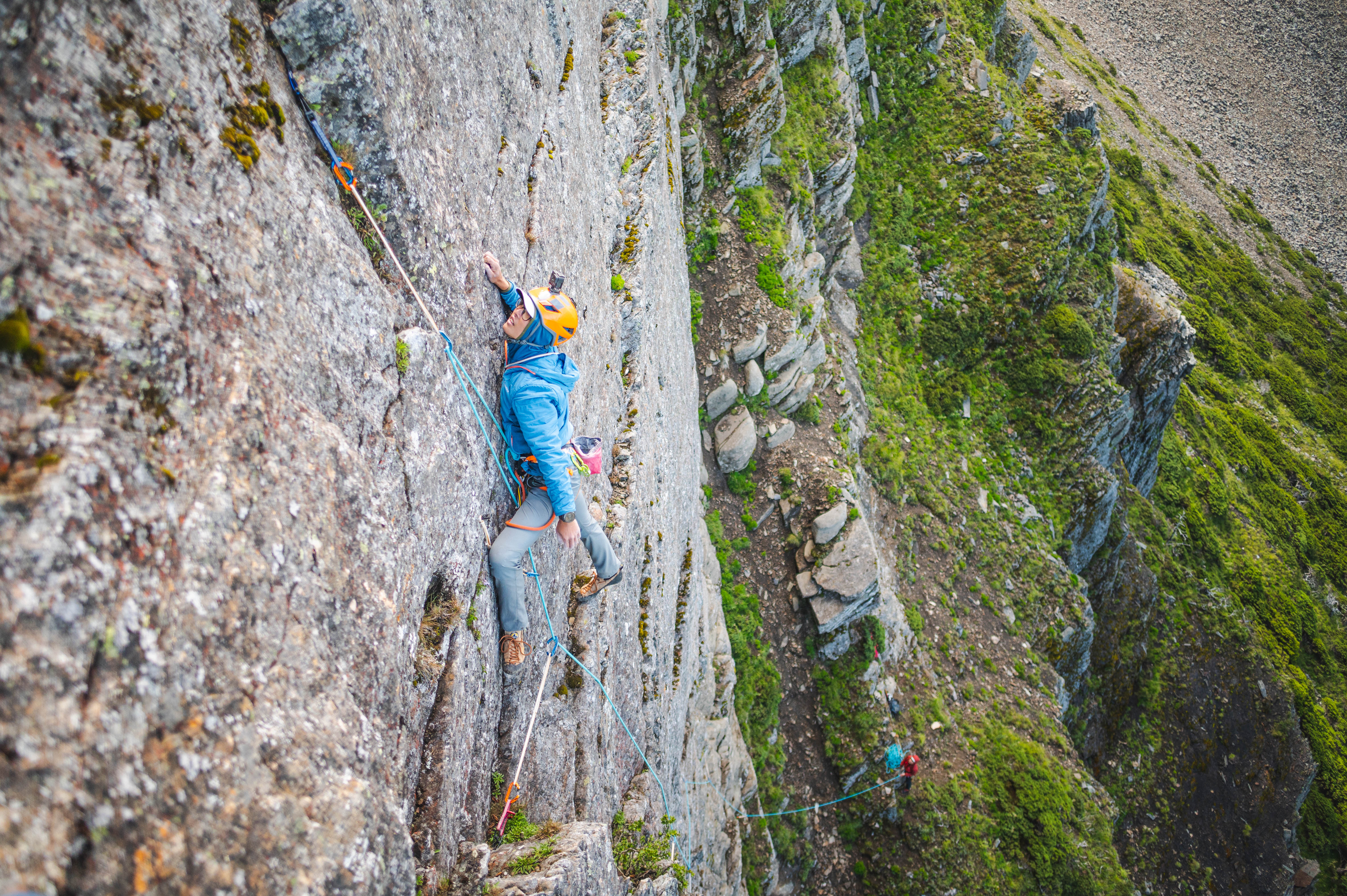
- Chang in 2022
- Born: 張元植; October 24, 1988; Taipei, Taiwan
- Died: June 27, 2024 (aged 35); North Face of Aiguille du Midi, Haute-Savoie, Auvergne-Rhone-Alpes, France
- Cause of death: Mountaineering accident
- Education: Tunghai University
- Occupations: mountaineer, mountain guide

Chang Yuan-chih (Chinese: 張元植; October 24, 1988 – June 27, 2024) was a Taiwanese professional mountaineer, mountain guide and manager of Chiaming Mountain House. He pioneered many technical climbing and mountain exploration routes in Taiwan, and co-sponsored the first winter climb of K2, the world's second-highest peak. He climbed Broad Peak at the age of 25, becoming the second youngest Taiwanese climber to climb an 8,000-meter peak.

== Background ==
Chang Yuan-chih was born in Taipei in 1988. After graduating from Wei-Ge Elementary School, his mother sent him to a comprehensive high school in Miaoli to receive extra-curricular education. At age 13, he began climbing. As a junior high school student, he climbed Yu Shan and Mount Dabajian, some of Taiwan's highest mountains. After completing the General Scholastic Ability Test in 2007, he and his schoolmate Huang Shao-Ting climbed Aconcagua, the highest peak in South America. In 2009, they completed the Taiwan Central Mountain Trail. He went on to Tunghai University and graduated with a degree in sociology. After his studies, Chang went on to manage the Forestry Administration's Chiaming Lake Mountain Lodge, and coach mountaineers.

In 2012, Chang and five of his friends participated in the Mongol Rally, driving a small car across 14 countries in Eurasia in 40 days, covering a total distance of 13,000 kilometers. This was the first time a Taiwanese team participated in this event.

== Climbing ==
=== Alpine climbing ===
On July 24, 2014, Chang climbed Broad Peak, without oxygen. In 2017, he reached 7,400 meters up the world's eighth highest peak, Manaslu, without oxygen, but had to descend before reaching the summit due to altitude sickness.

On May 15, 2019, Chang summited Makalu, the fifth highest peak in the world. On July 17 of the same year, he was part of the first Taiwanese team to attempt K2. Due to poor conditions near the summit, Chang retreated at an altitude of 8,200 meters and did not reach the summit.

On February 10, 2020, he and a climbing partner challenged the cliffs of Zhenshan in Wanrong Township. Due to heavy fog, they became trapped on the cliffs and were eventually being rescued by the National Airborne Service Corps.

=== Notable climbs ===
- August 18, 2021: Climbed the new route (YDS 5.9) on the east face of Yushan East Peak with Zhang Guowei, 5 pitches.
- October 9, 2021: Successfully climbed the South Face of Mount Dajian (YDS 5.10d) from Mount Taimu with Huang Yuanwei, Lin Mingqi, and Shen Hongying, 5 rope pitches.
- October 19, 2021: Climbed the new route of the north face of Yushan East Peak with Yang Chuihao (YDS 5.8), 450 meters, 11 rope pitches.
- December 2023: Climbed the west wall of Mount Gongga (5,928 meters above sea level) in mainland China, exploring new technical climbing routes, and retreating due to a blizzard at an altitude of 5,700 meters.
- 2023: Climbed Dhaulagiri, the seventh highest peak in the world, with Lu Zhonghan, exploring a new route, but did not reach the summit.

== Accident ==
At around 7:00 a.m. on June 27, 2024, Chang Yuan-chih and his mentor Chang Hsing-Wen were climbing Frendo Spur route on the north face of the Aiguille du Midi in the French Alps in Haute-Savoie. At a height of 3,200 m Chang Yuan-Chih fell 250 meters. The accident occurred before Chang Yuan-chih had clipped his safety rope, during a "non-technical" point on the climb. Chang Yuan-chih died before rescuers could arrive.
