= Yushan North Peak =

Mountain in Southern Nantou, Taiwan

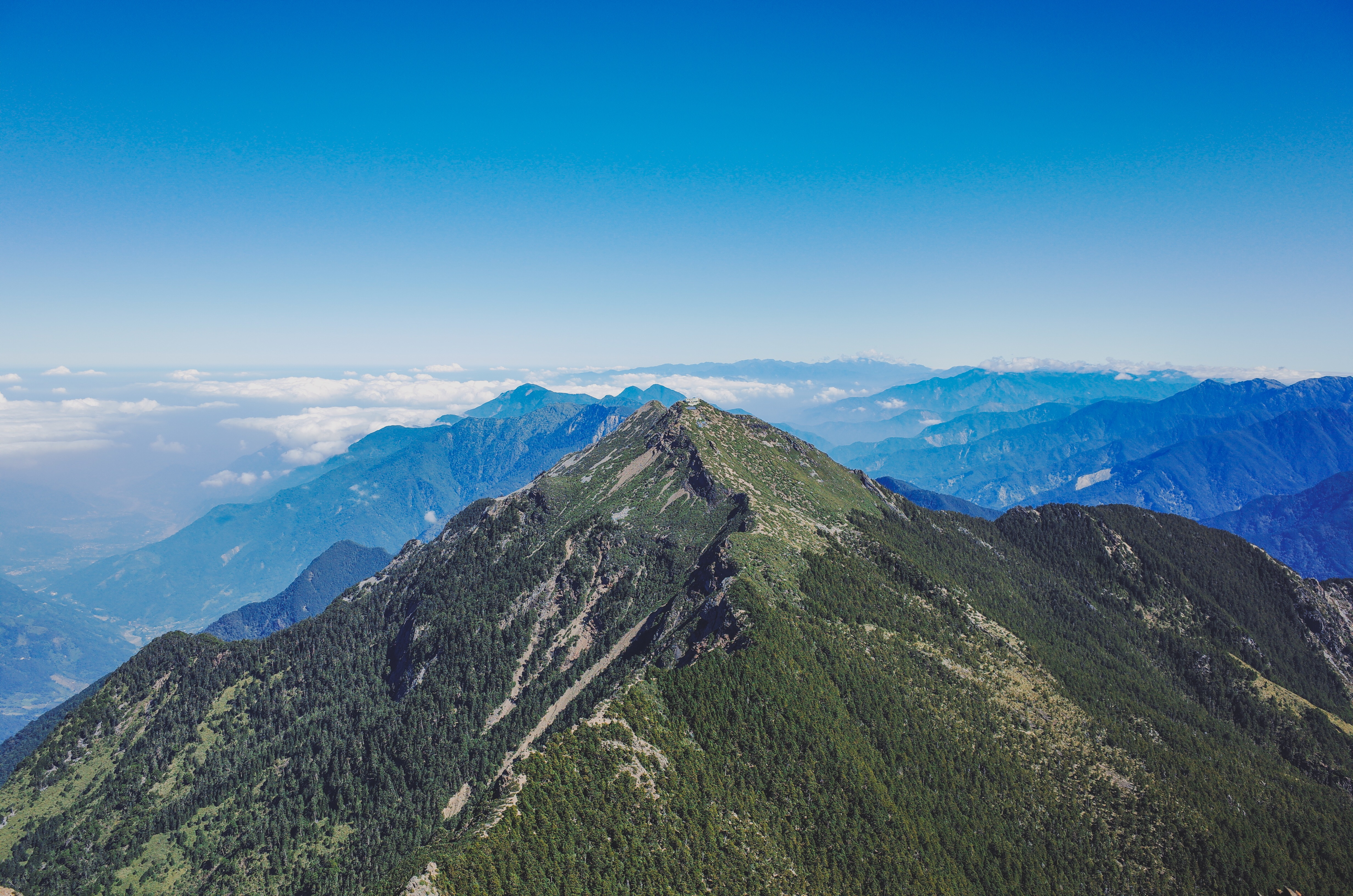

Highest point
- Elevation: 3,858 m (12,657 ft)
- Coordinates: 23°29′14.64″N 120°57′34.92″E

Geography
- Location within Taiwan
- Location: Xinyi Township, Nantou County, Taiwan
- Parent range: Yushan Range

Yushan North Peak (Chinese: 玉山北峰; pinyin: Yùshān běifēng) is a mountain of the Yushan Range located in the Yushan National Park. With a height of 3,858 m (12,657 ft), it is the 4th tallest mountain in Taiwan and the 3rd tallest in the Yushan Range. At the peak is the Yushan Weather Station, the highest weather station and building in Taiwan.

== See also ==
- Yushan National Park
- Yushan Range
- 100 Peaks of Taiwan
- List of mountains in Taiwan
