= Mount Tao =

Mountain in Hsinchu County, Taiwan

- Taoshan
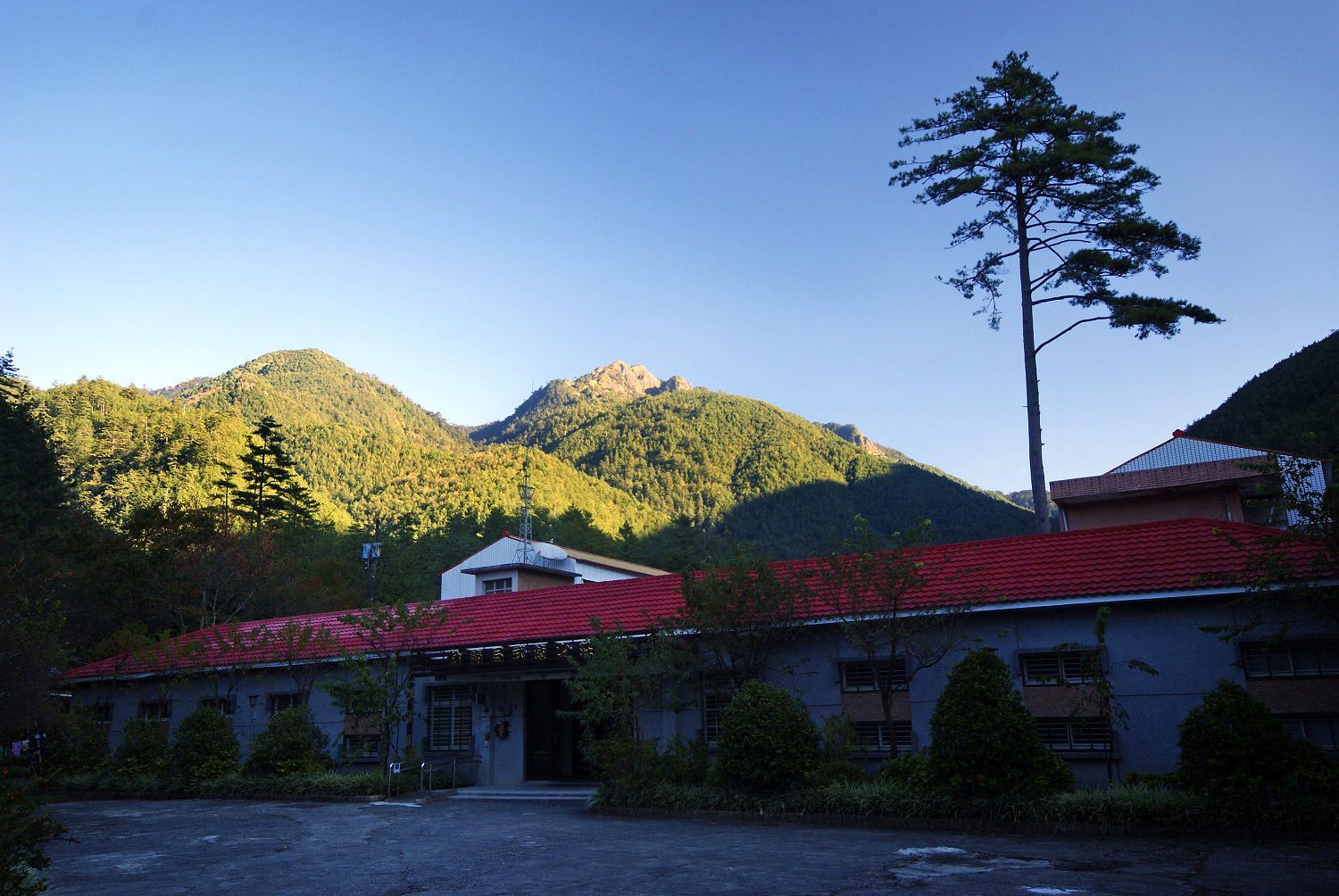

Highest point
- Elevation: 3,325 metres (10,909 ft)
- Listing: 100 Peaks of Taiwan
- Coordinates: 24°25′57″N 121°18′18″E

Geography
- Location within Taiwan
- Location: Heping District, Taichung/ Jianshi, Hsinchu County, Taiwan
- Parent range: Xueshan Range

Climbing
- Easiest route: Hike

Mount Tao (Chinese: 桃山; pinyin: Tao Shān) is a 3,325-metre-high (10,909 ft) mountain located in the north of Wuling Farm and is one of the Snow Mountains group. The mountain is ranked 44 on the Taiwan hiking declination scale; it borders Jianshi ridge, Hsinchu County, Taichung City and Heping District, and is marked with peakpoint label no. 6327. In the local Atayal language the mountain is known as "B'bu Qba", meaning "fist hill". In Chinese the name translates to "Peach" mountain, due to the view from the southwest side.

== Climbing routes ==
There are several climbing paths towards Mount Tao. The simplest is through the Wuling four show route, starting from Sancha camp. There is also another path that directly goes up to Mount Tao, which starts from Tao Shan waterfall park.

== See also ==
- 100 Peaks of Taiwan
- List of mountains in Taiwan
- Shei-Pa National Park
