= Fuyuan =

Fuyuan may refer to:

- Fuyuan River (富源溪), tributary of the Xiuguluan River, Taiwan
- Fuyuan, Heilongjiang (抚远), formerly Fuyuan County
  - Fuyuan Town (抚远镇), seat of Fuyuan, Heilongjiang
- Fuyuan County, Yunnan (富源县)
