= Xiuguluan River =

River in Taiwan

Coordinates: 23.4778°N 121.5022°E

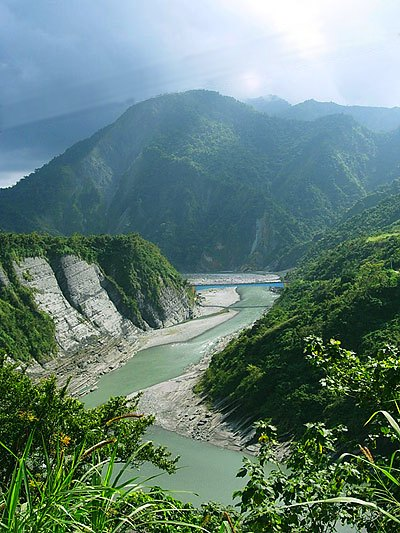
- Xiuguluan River in Hualien

Location
- Country: Taiwan

Physical characteristics
- Source
  - location: Mabolasi Mountain
  - elevation: 3,000 m (9,800 ft)
- Mouth
  - location: Pacific Ocean
  - elevation: 0 m (0 ft)
- Length: 104 km (65 mi)
- Basin size: 1,790.46 km^{2} (691.30 mi^{2})
- Discharge
  - maximum: 17,600 m^{3}/s (620,000 cu ft/s)

Basin features
- Tributaries
  - left: Lekuleku River; Fengping River; Hongye River; Fuyuan River

The Xiuguluan River (Chinese: 秀姑巒溪; Hanyu Pinyin: Xiùgūluán Xī; Tongyong Pinyin: Siòuguluán Si; Wade–Giles: Hsiu^{4}-ku^{1}-luan^{2} Hsi^{1}; Pe̍h-ōe-jī: Siù-ko͘-lôan-khoe) is the seventh-longest river in Taiwan with a total length of 104 km (65 mi). It is located in the southeastern part of the island. It flows through the Huadong Valley before emptying into the Pacific Ocean in Fengbin, Hualien.

== Overview ==
The Xiuguluan is the largest river in eastern Taiwan. It rises on the eastern side of Mabolasi Mountain (on the border with Taitung County) and flows through Xiuguluan Mountain before draining into the Pacific Ocean. Ciporan Island is located in the river's mouth.

Over 30 species of fish have been found in the river.

== Rafting ==
The river is known for its many rapids and has become a prime destination for rafting, especially on a 24 km (15 mi) section from Rueisuei Bridge to the Changhong Bridge.

== Tributaries ==
There are five major tributaries, listed here from mouth to source:

- Fuyuan River – Hualien County – 28 km
- Hongye River – Hualien County – 16 km
- Fengping River – Hualien County – 19 km
- Lakulaku River – Hualien County – 54 km

== See also ==
- List of rivers in Taiwan
