= Mount Pintian =

Mountain in Taiwan

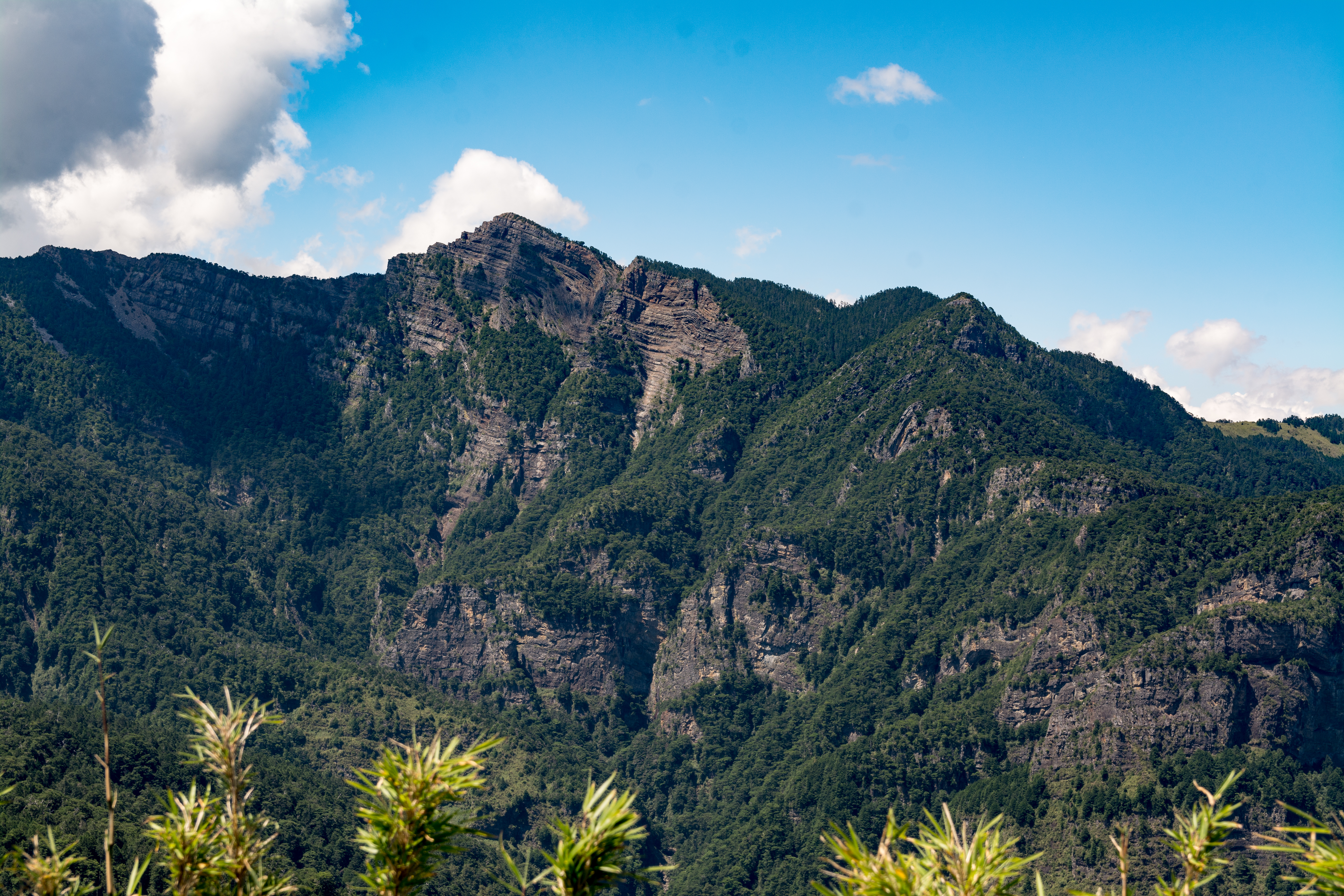

Highest point
- Elevation: 3,524 metres (11,562 ft)
- Listing: 100 Peaks of Taiwan
- Coordinates: 24.43°N 121.27°E

Geography
- Location within Taiwan
- Location: Heping District, Taichung/ Jianshi, Hsinchu County, Taiwan
- Parent range: Xueshan Range

Climbing
- Easiest route: Hike and rock climb

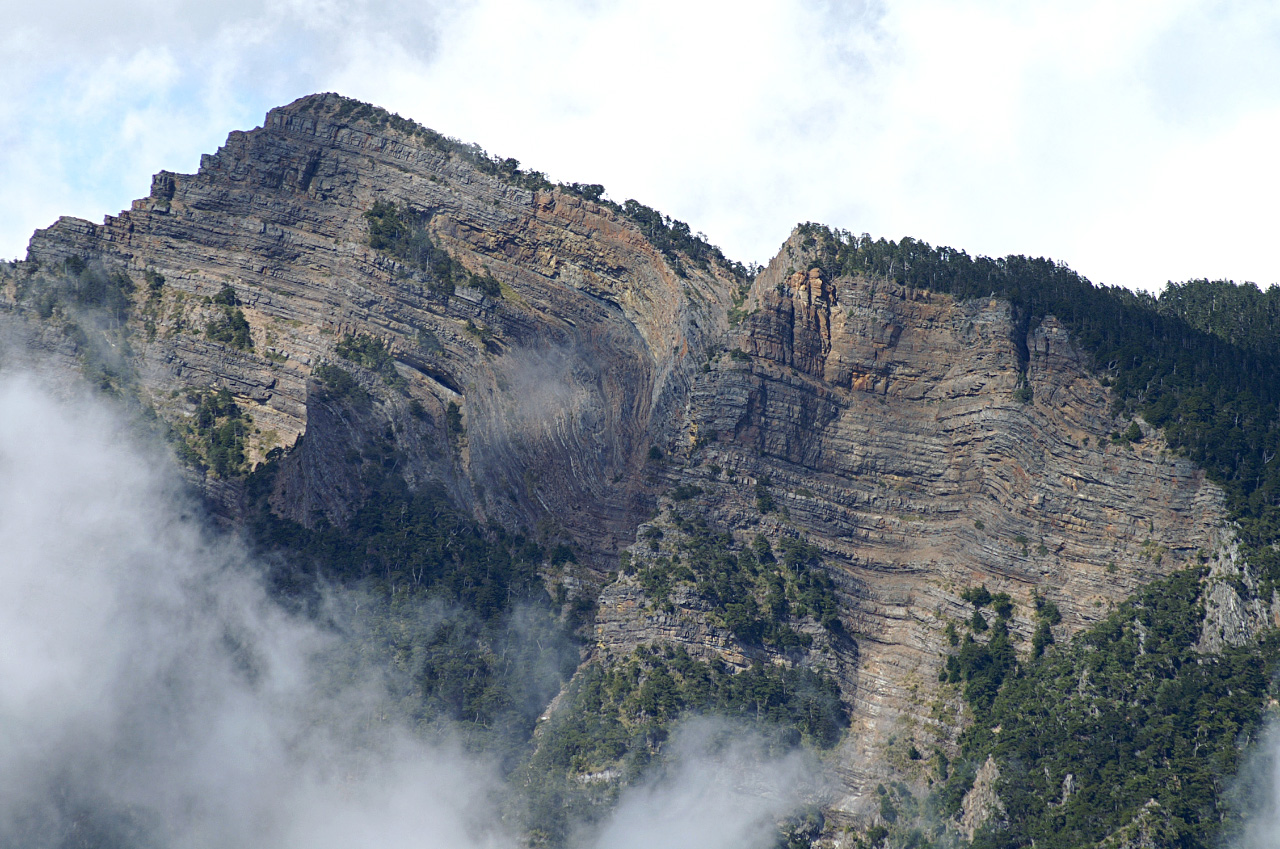
Pintian Mountain as viewed from the south

Mount Pintian (Chinese: 品田山; pinyin: Pǐntián Shān; Wade–Giles: P'in^{3}-t'ien^{2} Shan^{1}) is a mountain in Taiwan.

== Geology ==
The mountain stands with an elevation of 3,524 m (11,562 ft) and is part of the Shei-Pa National Park.

== See also ==
- 100 Peaks of Taiwan
- List of mountains in Taiwan
- Shei-Pa National Park
