= Ciporan Island =

Island in Fengbin Township, Hualien County, Taiwan

Coordinates: 23°27′53″N 121°30′02″E

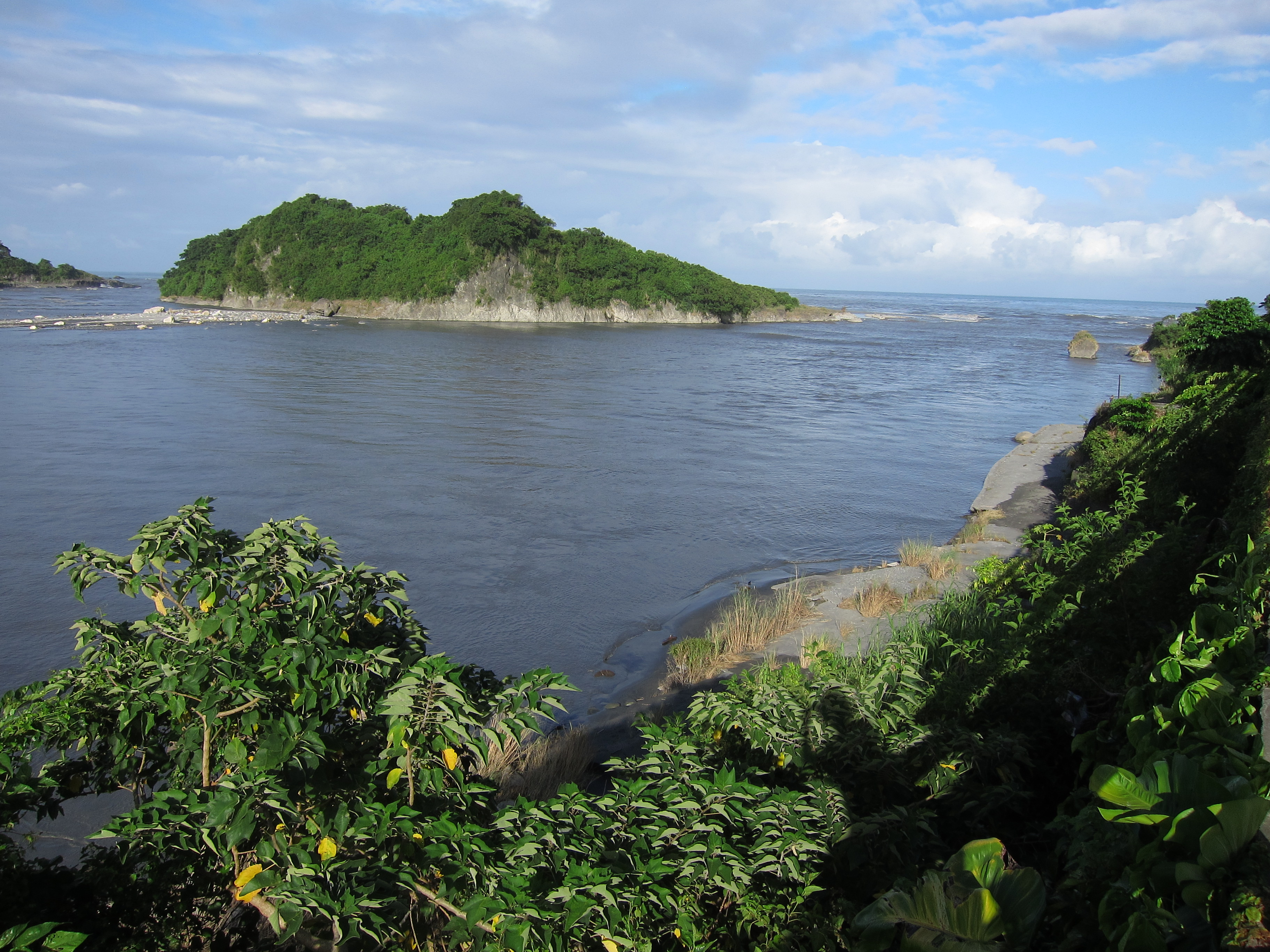
Ciporan Island at the estuary of the Xiuguluan River.

Ciporan Island (Chinese：奚卜蘭島), also referred to as Shiqiu Island and as Benten Island during the Japanese occupation, is an island located at the mouth of the Xiuguluan River in Gangkou and Jingpu villages of Fengbin Township, Hualien County, Taiwan. The island covers an area equivalent to approximately half a football field. Although Ciporan Island has long been subjected to erosion by seawater and river currents, its composition of volcanic breccia has given it a very hard geological structure, allowing it to stand firm over time. On the eastern side of Ciporan Island, the combined effects of seawater erosion and crustal uplift have created two marine abrasion platforms, featuring sea cave landscapes. Ciporan Island is also part of the Huadong Coastal Reserve.

== Geography ==
Isolated at the mouth of the Xiuguluan River, Ciporan Island's geography and geology are notable. It is composed of volcanic breccia from the Duluan Mountain formation, resulting in its prominent and rugged terrain due to the hardness of the rock.
