= Provincial Highway 16 (Taiwan) =

Provincial highway in Taiwan

Provincial Highway 16
- 台16線

Route information
- Maintained by Directorate General of Highways
- Length: 41.349 km (25.693 mi)

Major junctions
- West end: Prov 3 in Mingjian, Nantou
- East end: Xinyi, Nantou

Location
- Country: Taiwan

Highway system
- Highway system in Taiwan
← Prov 15	→ Prov 17

Provincial Highway 16 (Chinese: 台16線) is an East-West highway from Mingjian to Xinyi in Nantou County, Taiwan. The total length of the highway is 41.349 km. A plan to extend the highway for another 96.2 km which will pass through the Central Range was abandoned due to environmental issues and difficulty of construction.

== Route Description ==
The highway begins at the intersection with PH 3 in Mingjian. It then continues eastbound towards downtown Jiji and Shuili. In Shuili the highway has a brief concurrency with PH 21 until the latter continues in north-south direction. After leaving Shuili, the highway turns into a mountainous 1-lane road all the way towards its terminus in the aboriginal township of Xinyi, in front of Sunhai Bridge (孫海橋), which was destroyed by Typhoon Sinlaku in 2008. The section in Xinyi is closed daily from 5:30 pm to 7:00 am the next day.

The original plan of the highway was to continue from Xinyi all the way to Fenglin, Hualien, via the Danda Forest Road (丹大林道), Qicai Lake Trail (七彩湖登山步道), and Wanrong Forest Road (萬榮林道). But due to the difficulty of construction, only a short 2.2 km segment between Fenglin and Wanrong was built. In 2014 this segment of the highway was decommissioned.

== See also ==
- Highway system in Taiwan
