= Yushan East Peak =

Mountain in Kaohsiung and Nantou, Taiwan

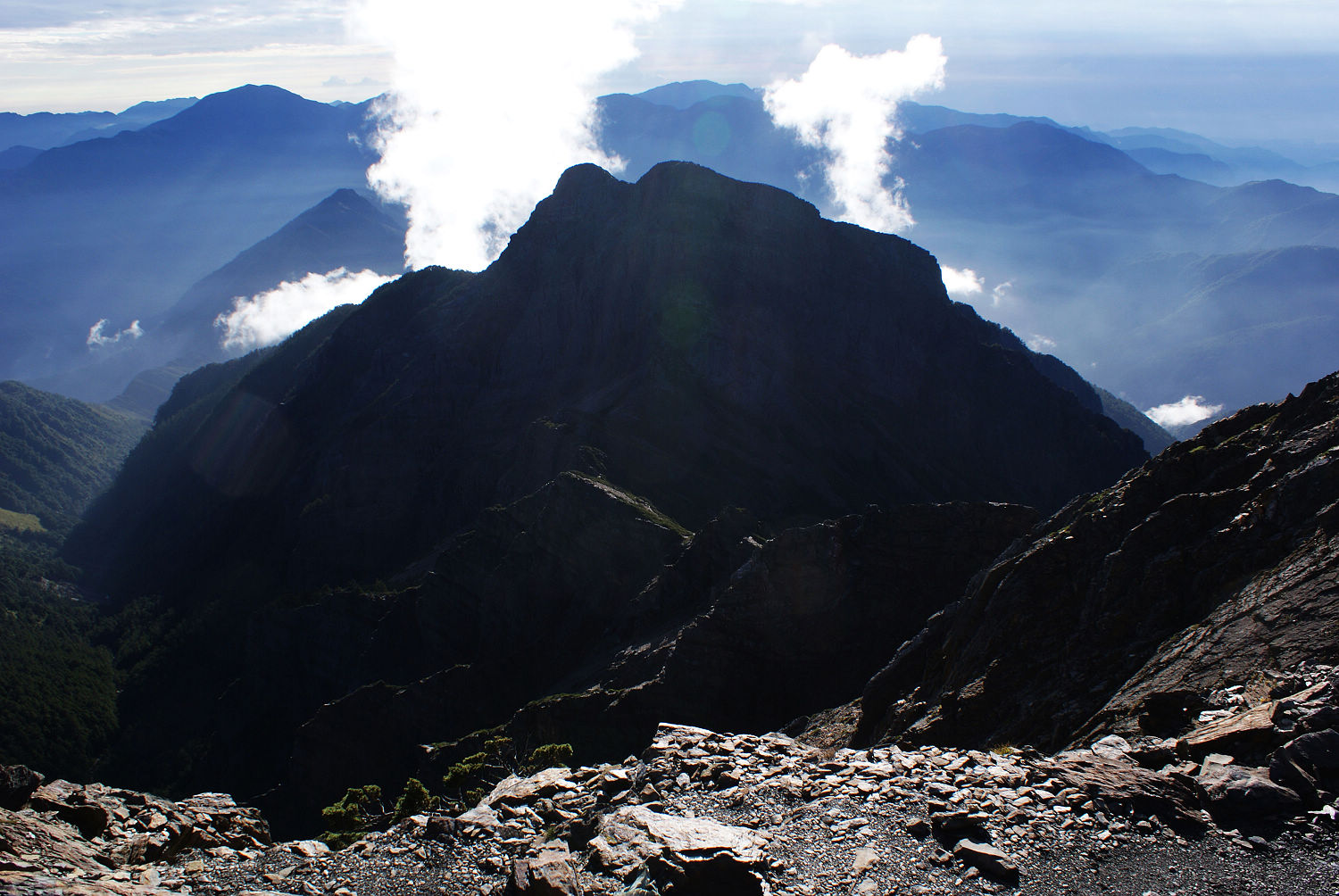
- View from the Main Peak

Highest point
- Elevation: 3,869 m (12,694 ft)
- Coordinates: 23°28′14.88″N 120°57′56.52″E

Geography
- Location within Taiwan
- Location: The border of Xinyi Township, Nantou County and Taoyuan District, Kaohsiung City, Taiwan
- Parent range: Yushan Range

Yushan East Peak (Chinese: 玉山東峰; Pinyin: Yùshān Dōngfēng) is a mountain of the Yushan Range located in the Yushan National Park. With a height of 3,869 m (12,694 ft), it is the 3rd tallest mountain in Taiwan and the 2nd tallest in the Yushan Range.

== Climbing ==
Reaching the mountain requires going down a ridge behind the Main Peak and ascending up a series of steep cliffs.

== See also ==
- 100 Peaks of Taiwan
- Yushan
- Yushan Range
- Yushan National Park
- List of mountains in Taiwan
