= Mount Nenggao =

Mountain in Taiwan

Mount Nenggao 能高山
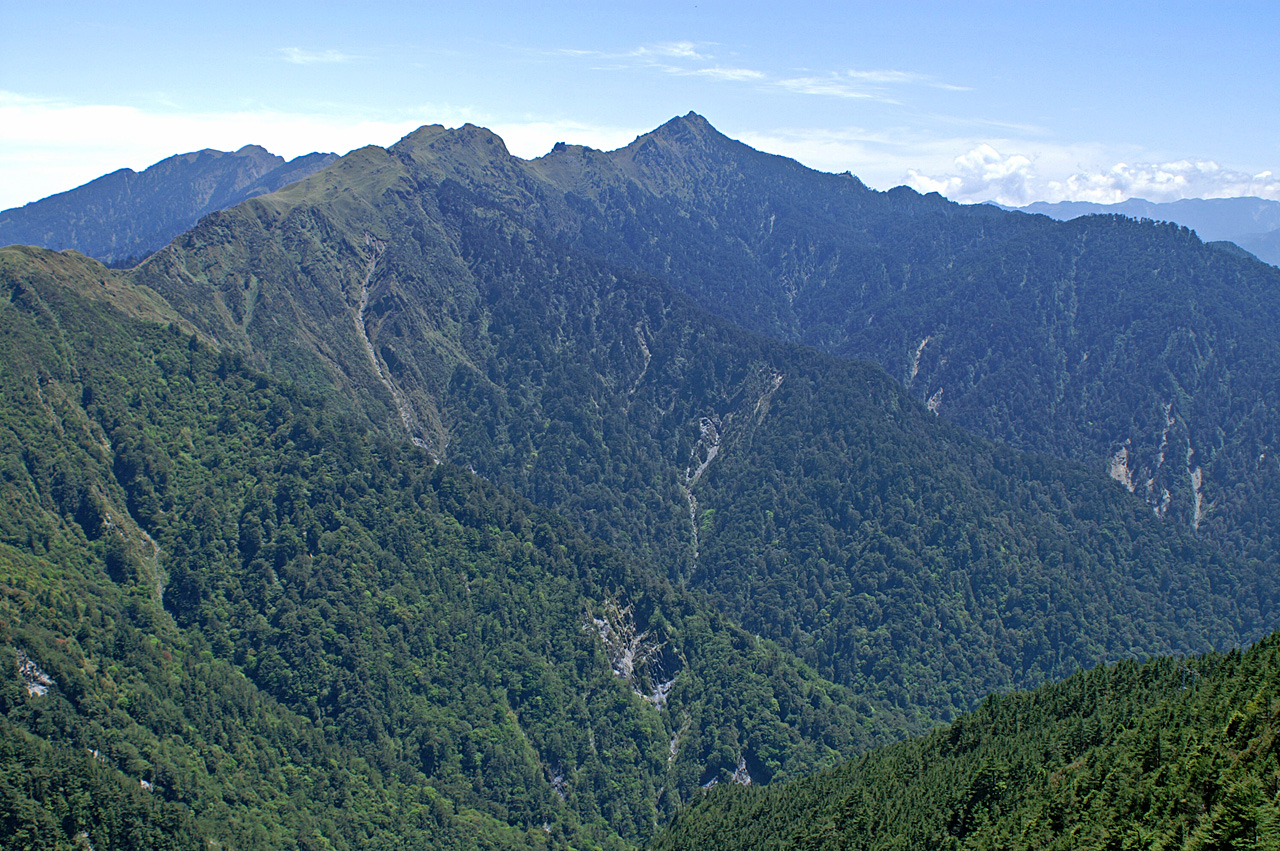

Highest point
- Elevation: 3,261 m (10,699 ft)
- Listing: 100 Peaks of Taiwan; List of mountains in Taiwan
- Coordinates: 23°59′32″N 121°15′36″E

Geography
- Location within Taiwan
- Location: Taiwan

Mount Nenggao (Chinese: 能高山; pinyin: Nénggāo Shān) is a mountain in Taiwan. Its southern peak has an elevation of 3,349 metres (10,988 ft). The main peak has an elevation of 3,261 metres (10,699 ft).
