= Taroko Mountain =

Mountain in Huanlien County, Taiwan

- Location within Taiwan

Highest point
- Elevation: 3,283 m (10,771 ft)
- Listing: 100 Peaks of Taiwan
- Coordinates: 24°04′57″N 121°25′09″E

Geography
- Location: Xiulin, Hualien County, Taiwan
- Parent range: Central Mountain Range

Taroko Mountain is a mountain in Taiwan with an elevation of 3,283 m (10,771 ft).

== See also ==
- List of mountains in Taiwan
