= Lakulaku River =

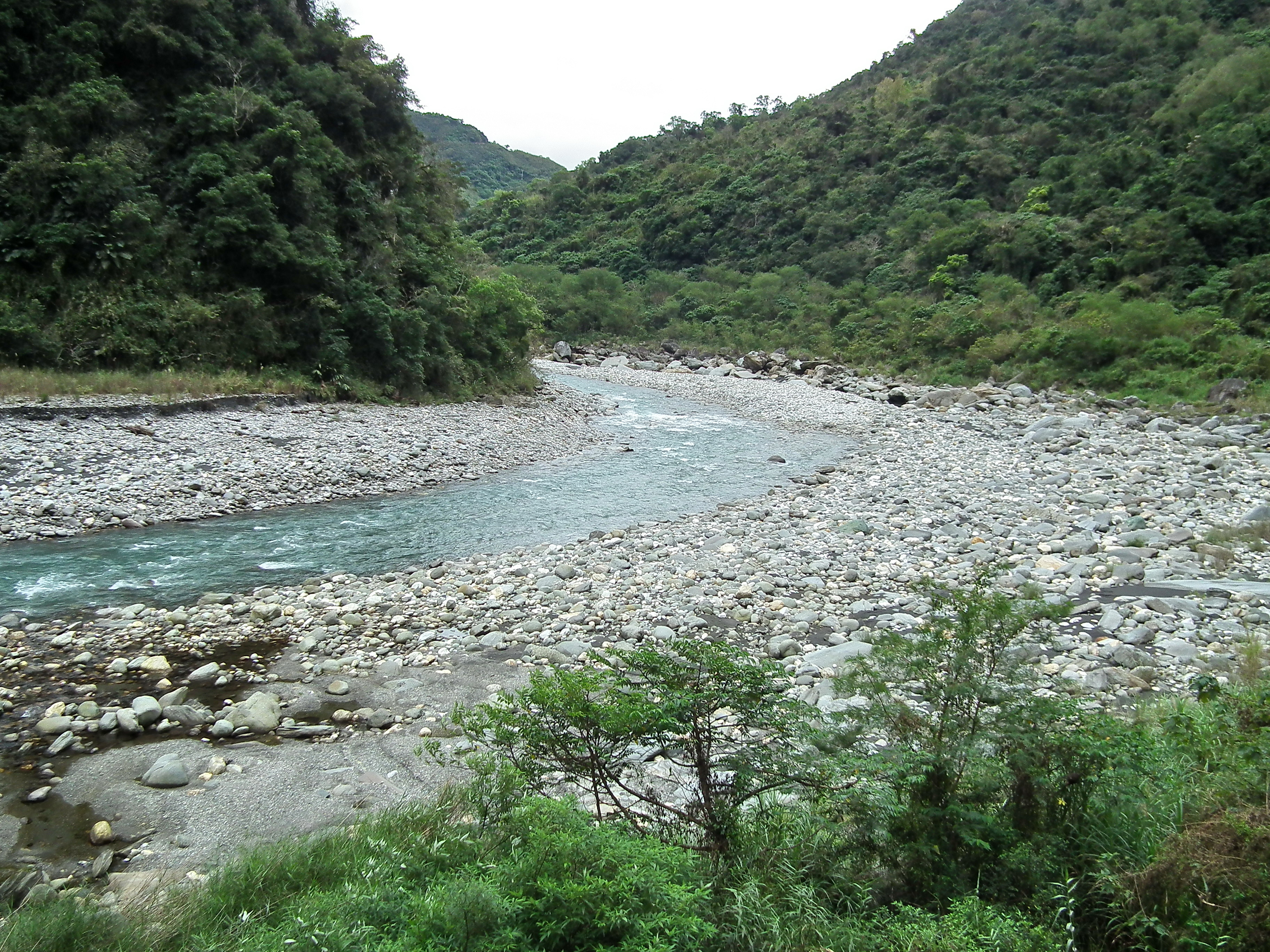

Location
- Country: Taiwan

Physical characteristics
- Mouth
  - location: Xiuguluan River
  - coordinates: 23.315°N 121.332°E
- Length: 53.76 km (33.40 mi)
- Basin size: 628.40 km^{2} (242.63 sq mi)
- Discharge
  - maximum: 8,720 m^{3}/s (308,000 cu ft/s)

Basin features
- River system: Xiuguluan River basin

The Lakulaku River (Chinese: 拉庫拉庫溪; pinyin: Lākùlākù Xī), also called Lekuleku River or Lele River (樂樂溪), is a tributary of the Xiuguluan River in Taiwan. It flows through Hualien County for 54 kilometres (34 mi) before joining Xiuguluan River in Yuli, Hualien.

== See also ==
- List of rivers in Taiwan
