= Mount Zhuoshe =

Mountain in Nantou County, Taiwan

Coordinates: 23.83415°N 121.11534°E

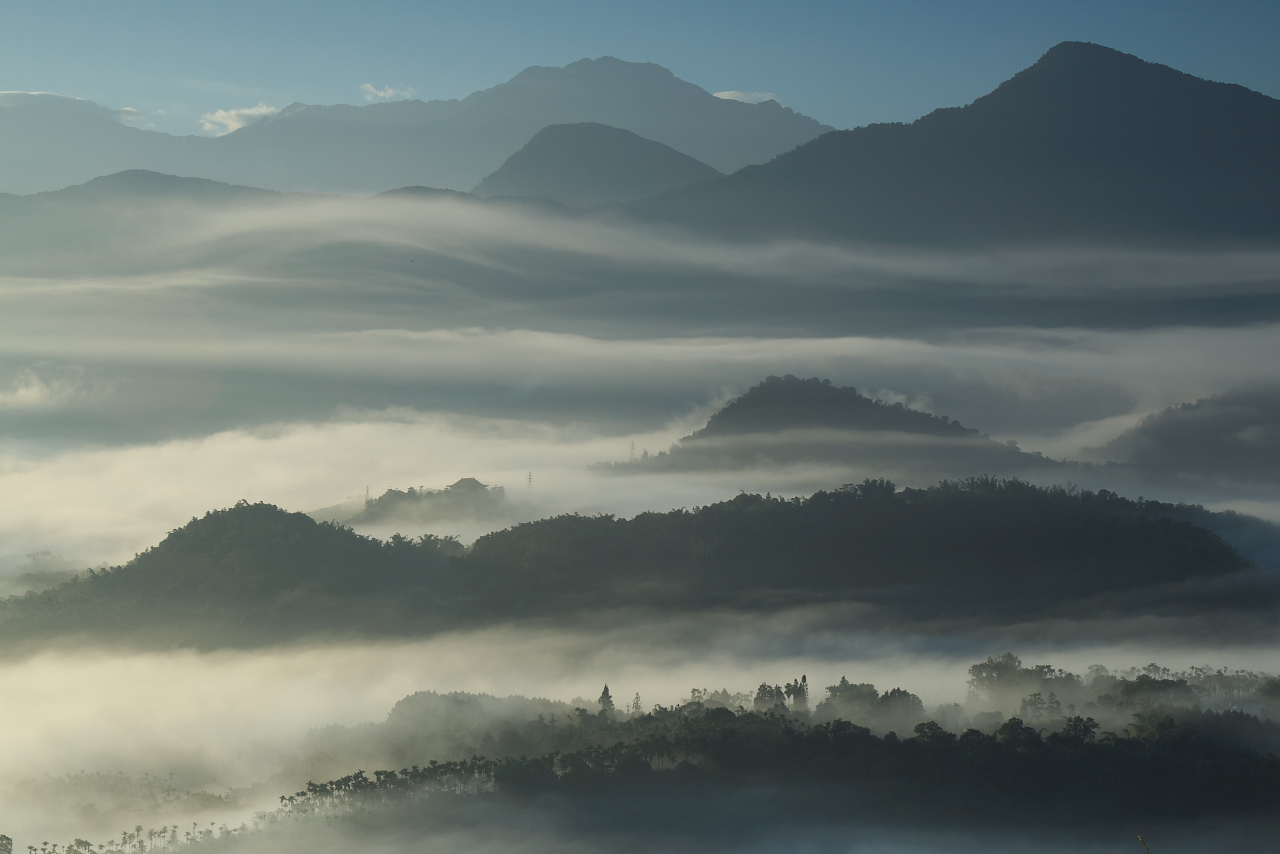
Mount Zhuoshe

Mount Zhuoshe or Mount Cho-she (Chinese: 卓社大山) is a mountain in Nantou County, Taiwan with an elevation of 3,369 m (11,053 ft). It is located at the border of Ren'ai and Xinyi Township.

== See also ==
- List of mountains in Taiwan
