= Fengping River =

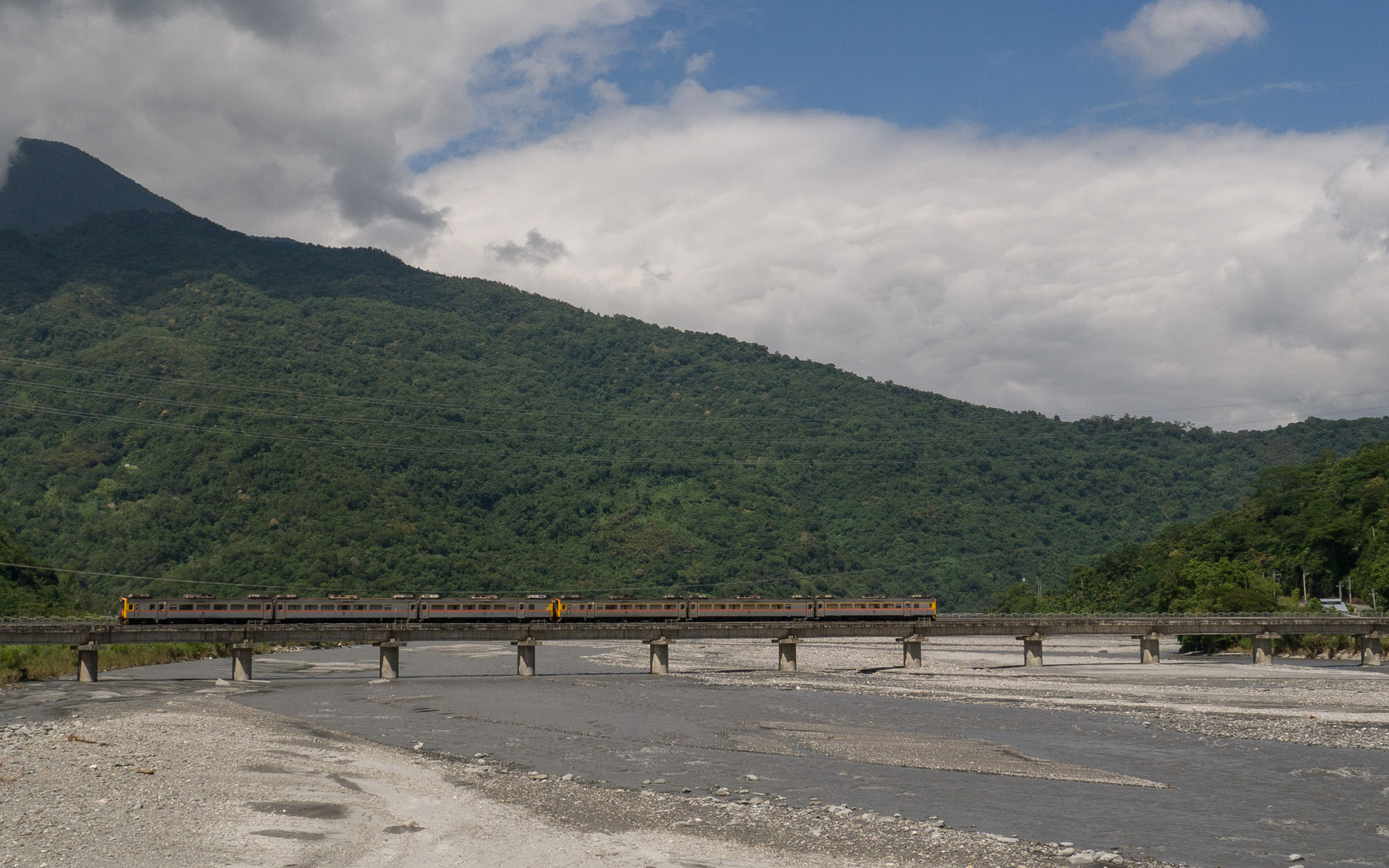

- Location within Taiwan

Location
- Country: Taiwan

Physical characteristics
- Mouth
  - location: Xiuguluan River
  - coordinates: 23.391°N 121.343°E
- Length: 19.0 km (11.8 mi)
- Basin size: 286.80 km^{2} (110.73 mi^{2})
- Discharge
  - maximum: 3,930 m^{3}/s (139,000 cu ft/s)

Basin features
- River system: Xiuguluan River basin

The Fengping River (Chinese: 豐坪溪; Hanyu Pinyin: Fēngpíng Xī; Tongyong Pinyin: Fongpíng Si) is a tributary of the Xiuguluan River in Taiwan. It flows through Hualien County for 19 km before joining Xiuguluan River in Yuli, Hualien.

== See also ==
- List of rivers in Taiwan
