= Mount Mabolasi =

Mountain in Xinyi, Nantou County, Taiwan

- Mount Wulameng

Highest point
- Elevation: 3,785 m (12,418 ft)
- Listing: 100 Peaks of Taiwan
- Coordinates: 23°31′13.1″N 121°04′01.8″E

Naming
- Native name: 馬博拉斯山 (Chinese)

Geography
- Location: Xinyi, Nantou County, Taiwan
- Parent range: Central Mountain Range

The Mount Mabolasi or Mabolasi Mountain (traditional Chinese: 馬博拉斯山; simplified Chinese: 马博拉斯山; pinyin: Mǎbólāsī Shān) is a mountain in Taiwan. The peak is located in Xinyi Township, Nantou County, near the border of Hualien County. It is also known as the Mount Wulameng (traditional Chinese: 烏拉孟山; simplified Chinese: 乌拉孟山; pinyin: Wūlāmèng Shān).

== Geology ==
The mountain is located within the Central Mountain Range with a maximum peak height of 3,785 metres (12,418 ft). It is the fourth highest mountain of Taiwan.

== History ==
On 22 September 2015, an AIDC AT-3 of the Republic of China Air Force crashed around the mountain area during routine training flight, killing its two pilots.

On 20 January 2019, Taiwanese hiker, Gigi Wu, known for her social media photos of herself atop Taiwanese mountains wearing only two-piece bathing suits, fell into a 20-meter valley near Mabolasi Mountain. Rescue workers found her deceased.

== See also ==
- 100 Peaks of Taiwan
- List of mountains in Taiwan
- Yushan National Park
