= Mount Dongjunda =

Mountain in Nantou County, Taiwan

- Location within Nantou County

Highest point
- Elevation: 3,619 m (11,873 ft)
- Coordinates: 23.6267°N 121.0921°E

Naming
- Native name: 東郡大山 (Chinese)

Mount Dongjunda (Chinese: 東郡大山; lit. 'mountain to the east of the Junda (Isbukun) Group') is a mountain in Xinyi Township, Nantou County, Taiwan with an elevation of 3,619 m (11,873 ft).

== See also ==
- List of mountains in Taiwan
