= Fuyuan River =

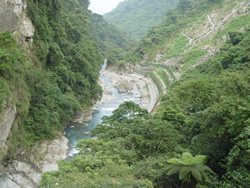
- Fuyuan River in the Fuyuan National Forest Recreation Area

- Location within Taiwan

Location
- Country: Taiwan

Physical characteristics
- Source
  - location: Dan Mountain
- Mouth
  - location: Xiuguluan River
  - coordinates: 23.492°N 121.407°E
- Length: 28.8 km (17.9 mi)
- Basin size: 186.90 km^{2} (72.16 mi^{2})
- Discharge
  - maximum: 2,540 m^{3}/s (90,000 cu ft/s)

Basin features
- River system: Xiuguluan River basin
- Waterfalls: Fuyuan Waterfall

The Fuyuan River (Chinese: 富源溪; pinyin: Fùyuán Xī) is a tributary of the Xiuguluan River in Taiwan. Originating from the Dan Mountain, it flows through Hualien County for 28 km (passing through Fuyuan National Forest Recreation Area) before joining Xiuguluan River in Ruisui, Hualien.

== See also ==
- List of rivers in Taiwan
