= Shei-Pa National Park =

National park in Taiwan

- IUCN category II (national park)
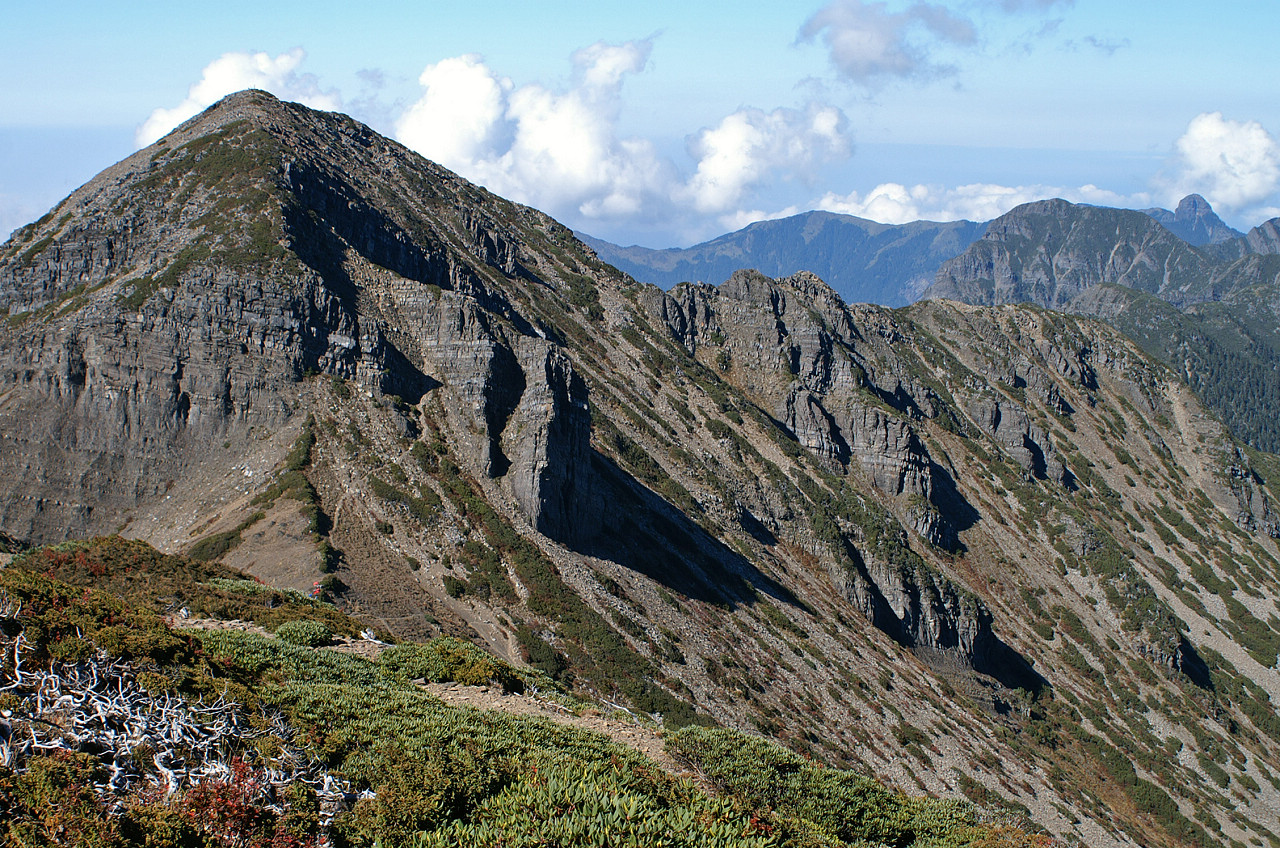
- The Holy Ridge, Shei-Pa National Park

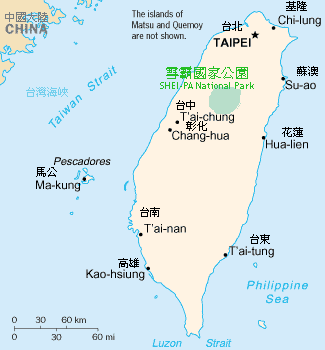
- Location of Shei-Pa National Park
- Location: Taiwan
- Coordinates: 24°23′13″N 121°08′17″E
- Area: 768.5 km^{2} (296.7 mi^{2})
- Established: 1 July 1992
- Governing body: Shei-Pa National Park Headquarters, National Park Service, Ministry of the Interior, Taiwan
- Website: www.spnp.gov.tw

Shei-Pa National Park (Chinese: 雪霸國家公園; pinyin: Xuěbà Guójiā Gōngyuán; Pe̍h-ōe-jī: Soat-pà Kok-ka Kong-hn̂g) is a national park located in the central part of Taiwan around the peaks of Hsueh/Sekuwan and Dabajian/Papak Waqa, with an area of 768.5 km^{2} (296.7 mi^{2}), covering the area of Hsinchu County, Miaoli County and Taichung City. High mountain ecology, geology, topography, rivers, creek valleys, rare animals and plants, and plentiful variety of forest types are some important resources for conservation.

The park's headquarters was set up on 1 July 1992. The current headquarters director is Lin Ching (林青). The address of Shei-Pa National Park is 100 Xueweiping, Fuxing Village, Dahu Township, Miaoli County, Taiwan.

== Geography, Climate and Geology ==
Shei-Pa National Park is located some 100 km north of the Tropic of Cancer. The park covers a wide range of ecosystems between 760 meters at the lowest point, the Da-an River Valley (大安溪) and 3,886 meters elevation at the highest point, the top of Xueshan (雪山主峰). Xueshan is the second tallest mountain in Taiwan. The Xueshan Range is located along the northern end of Taiwan's Central Range. Like most of the mountains of Taiwan, the Xueshan Range mountains are an uplifted metamorphic belt that makes up the spine of the country. Notable geologic features of the park include the box fold of Pintian Mountain as well as many glacial cirques.

The mountains of Shei-Pa cradle the headwaters of several major rivers in Taiwan. The park receives between 1,500 mm and 3,000 mm of rainfall a year and is an important water resource for the country: Takejin Creek flows north to join the Danshui River, which provides water for Taipei. The Dajia River and the Da-an River flow west and north west to provide water to Taichung County. The Touqian River flows northwest to Hsinchu County.

Asteroid 278956 Shei-Pa was named after the national park. The official naming citation was published by the Minor Planet Center on 25 September 2018 (M.P.C. 111804).

=== Climate ===
Climate data for Shei-Pa (Xueba), elevation 1,956 m (6,417 ft), (2012–2021 normals, extremes 2008–present)
Month	Jan	Feb	Mar	Apr	May	Jun	Jul	Aug	Sep	Oct	Nov	Dec	Year
Record high °C (°F)	20.7 (69.3)	24.4 (75.9)	26.4 (79.5)	26.4 (79.5)	27.1 (80.8)	26.1 (79.0)	28.1 (82.6)	27.8 (82.0)	28.7 (83.7)	27.6 (81.7)	25.0 (77.0)	21.1 (70.0)	28.7 (83.7)
Mean daily maximum °C (°F)	13.0 (55.4)	14.3 (57.7)	16.4 (61.5)	18.4 (65.1)	20.5 (68.9)	22.3 (72.1)	22.7 (72.9)	22.0 (71.6)	21.8 (71.2)	20.3 (68.5)	17.8 (64.0)	14.2 (57.6)	18.6 (65.5)
Daily mean °C (°F)	8.3 (46.9)	9.5 (49.1)	11.8 (53.2)	13.9 (57.0)	16.5 (61.7)	18.2 (64.8)	18.3 (64.9)	17.9 (64.2)	17.1 (62.8)	15.2 (59.4)	13.3 (55.9)	10.0 (50.0)	14.2 (57.5)
Mean daily minimum °C (°F)	5.2 (41.4)	6.4 (43.5)	8.5 (47.3)	11.0 (51.8)	14.1 (57.4)	15.7 (60.3)	15.7 (60.3)	15.5 (59.9)	14.4 (57.9)	12.3 (54.1)	10.6 (51.1)	7.2 (45.0)	11.4 (52.5)
Record low °C (°F)	−7.3 (18.9)	−5.1 (22.8)	−1.9 (28.6)	−1.5 (29.3)	8.3 (46.9)	10.9 (51.6)	13.0 (55.4)	13.3 (55.9)	9.6 (49.3)	3.7 (38.7)	−1.6 (29.1)	−2.5 (27.5)	−7.3 (18.9)
Average precipitation mm (inches)	115.0 (4.53)	132.0 (5.20)	198.8 (7.83)	204.9 (8.07)	313.5 (12.34)	323.9 (12.75)	327.2 (12.88)	328.1 (12.92)	313.5 (12.34)	87.8 (3.46)	92.3 (3.63)	107.3 (4.22)	2,544.3 (100.17)
Average precipitation days	10.8	11.4	13.0	14.0	17.2	17.4	16.9	19.3	15.2	11.1	10.0	10.8	167.1
Average relative humidity (%)	78.4	80.5	80.6	83.1	85.4	84.3	84.9	88.8	87.4	83.2	79.8	78.9	82.9
Source 1: Central Weather Administration
Source 2: Atmospheric Science Research and Application Databank (precipitation 2008–2023, precipitation days and humidity 2007–2023)

== Flora ==
In 2022 a team of researchers measured a 79.1 meters (260 ft) Taiwania specimen in the Park. The tree was growing at an elevation of 2,000 metres (6,600 ft). The team has worked to photograph and measure the height of many trees in the park, growing up in the mountains. Thus far, they found 941 trees at least 65 metres (213 ft) tall.

== See also ==
- List of national parks in Taiwan
