= Xinyi, Nantou =

Mountain indigenous township in Nantou County, Taiwan

Coordinates: 23°39′44.5″N 121°00′56.6″E

Xinyi Township 信義鄉
- Mountain indigenous township
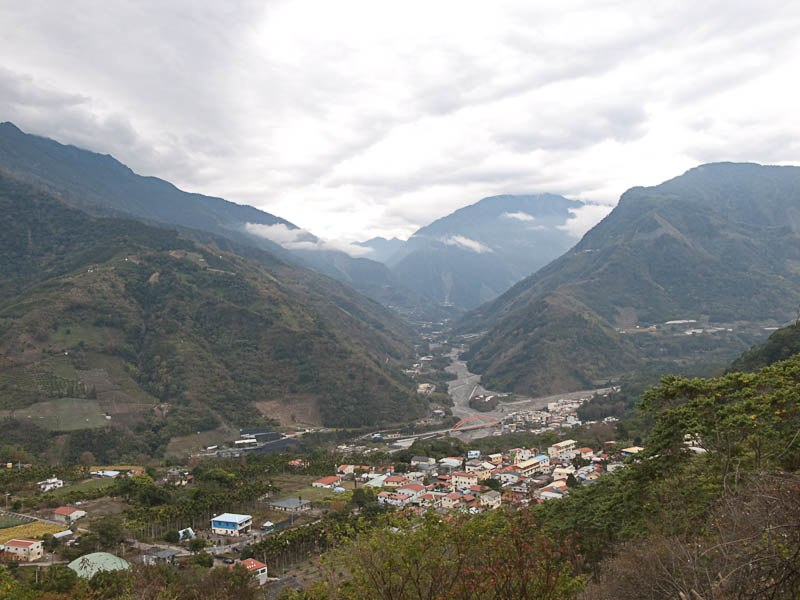

- Xinyi Township in Nantou County
- Location: Nantou County, Taiwan

Area
  - Total: 1,422 km^{2} (549 sq mi)

Population (February 2023)
  - Total: 15,576
  - Density: 10.95/km^{2} (28.37/sq mi)

Xinyi Township or Sinyi Township (Chinese: 信義鄉; pinyin: Xìnyì Xiāng) is a mountain indigenous township in Nantou County, Taiwan. It is the largest township by area of Nantou County. Xinyi is home to the Bunun people of the Taiwanese aborigines.

== Geography ==
It has a population total of 15,576 and an area of 1,422.42 square kilometres (549.20 sq mi).

== Administrative divisions ==
Xinyi Township administrative divisions

The township comprises 14 villages:

- 1 Tannan
- 2 Deli
- 3 Shuanglong
- 4 Tungpu
- 5 Tongfu
- 6 Shenmu
- 7 Wangmei
- 8 Luona
- 9 Xinxiang
- 10 Zijiang
- 11 Aiguo
- 12 Mingde
- 13 Renhe
- 14 Fengqiu

== Economy ==
The township ranks first in Taiwan in terms of plum production, reaching an annual production of 20,000 tonnes.

== Infrastructures ==
- Lulin Observatory

== Tourist attractions ==
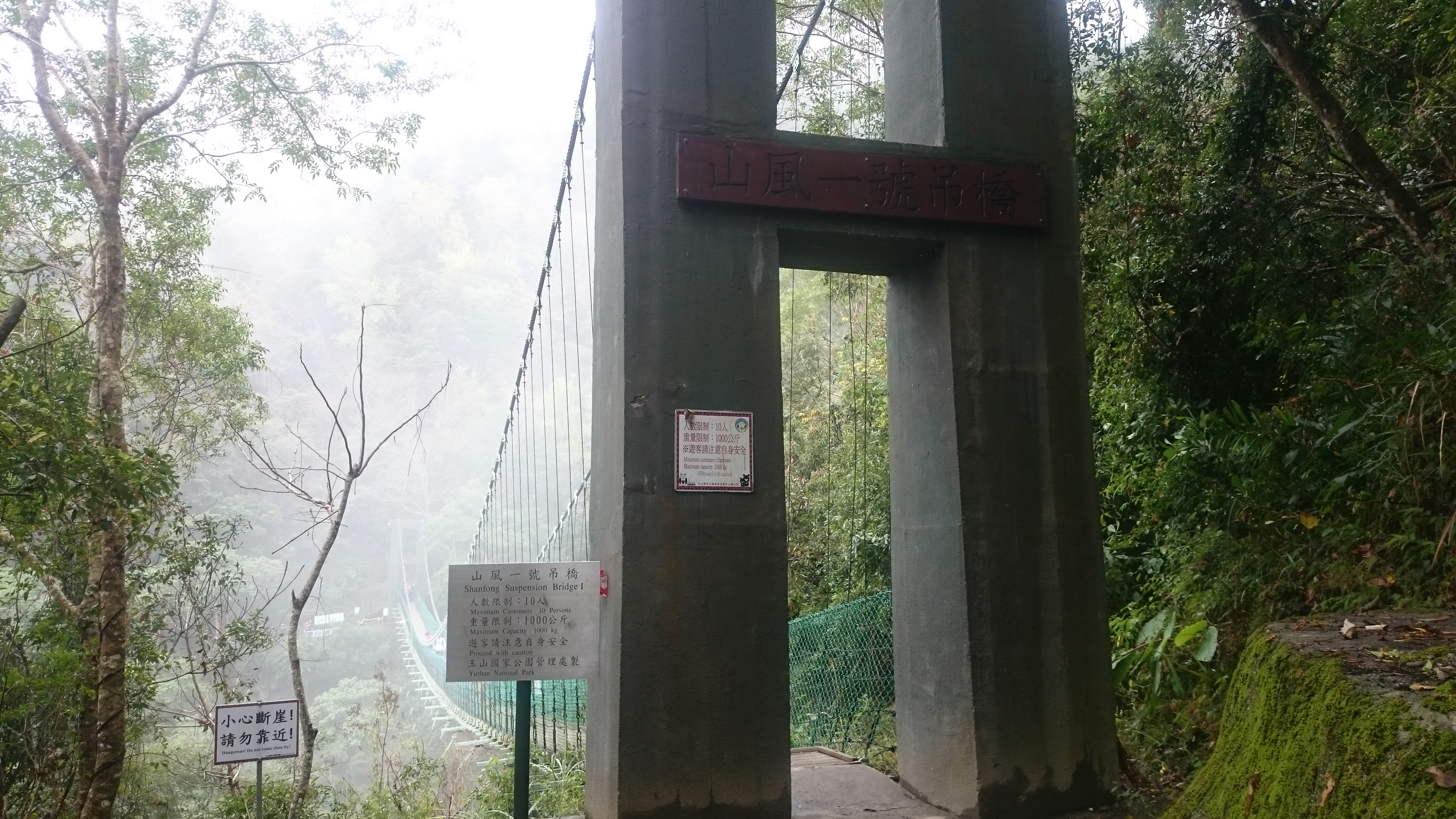
Batongguan Historic Trail

- Batongguan Trail
- Mount Dongjun
- Mount Mabolasi
- Mount Zhuoshe
- Shuiyuan Suspension Bridge
- Yushan National Park
- Fengguidou
- Dongpu Hot Springs
- Pinglai Scenic Area
- Rainbow Falls, Lover's Valley
- Cloud Dragon Falls, Double Dragon Falls
- Fubuzhizi Precipice
- Danda Mountain Trail, Danye Mountain Trail
- Seven Colors Lake
- Papaya Pit Falls
- Shenmu Giant Camphor Tree
- Husband and Wife Trees

== Transportation ==
- Provincial Highway No. 16
- Provincial Highway No. 18
- Provincial Highway No. 21
